= St. Joseph's Church, Semarang =

Catholic church in Indonesia

St. Joseph's Church
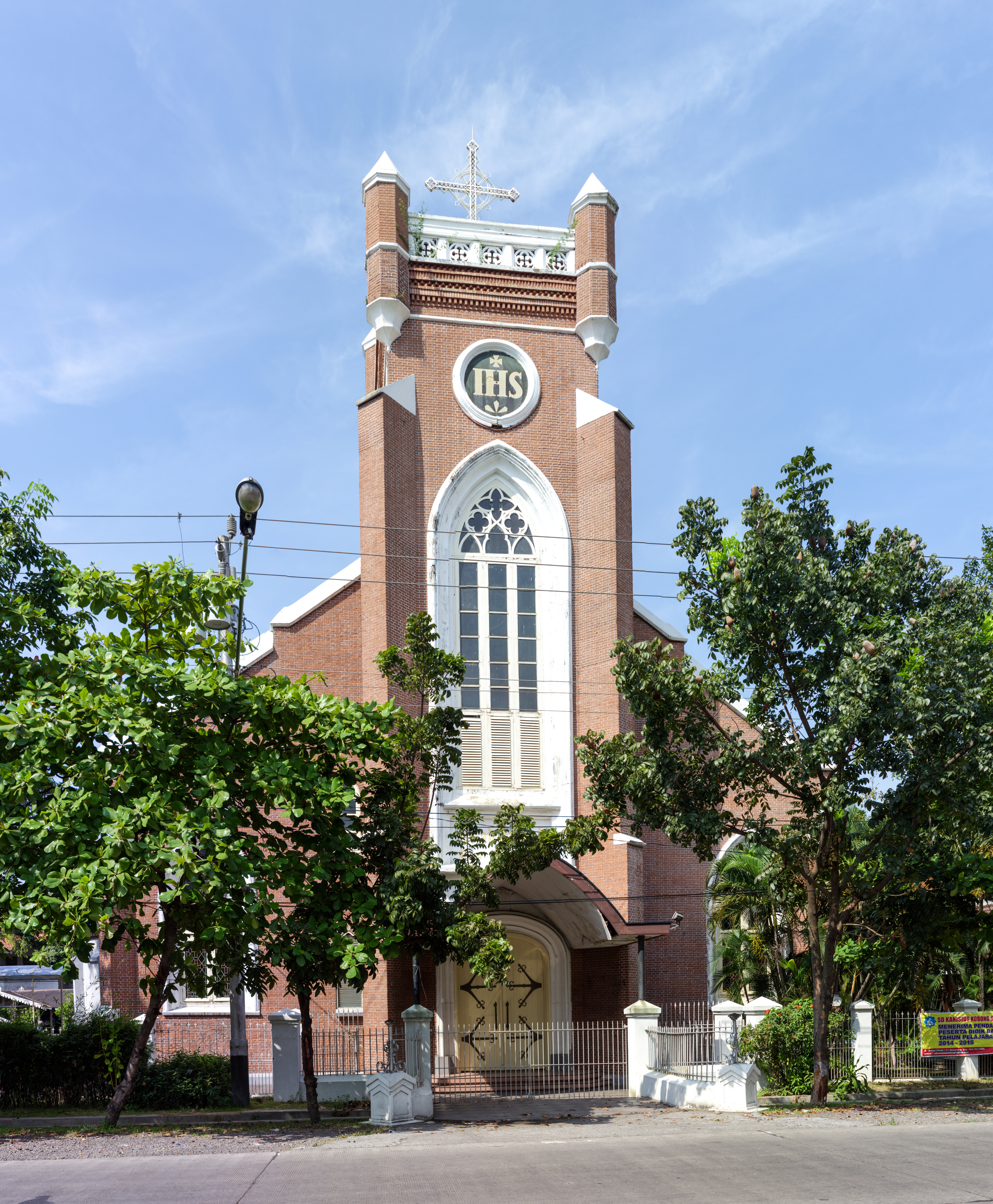

- Location in Semarang
- 6.965963°S 110.431006°E
- Location: Semarang
- Country: Indonesia
- Denomination: Roman Catholic

Architecture
- Functional status: Active
- Architect: W. I. van Bakel
- Style: Neogothic
- Groundbreaking: 1 October 1870
- Completed: 12 December 1875

Specifications
- Capacity: 800

Administration
- Province: Semarang
- Parish: Gedangan

St. Joseph's Church (Indonesian: Gereja Santo Yusuf), also known as Gedangan Church, is a Catholic church in Semarang, Indonesia, the first such church in the city. Administratively, it is part of the St. Joseph's Parish in the Archdiocese of Semarang.

Constructed between 1870 and 1875 to meet the needs of Semarang's growing Catholic population, the red-brick church building was designed by the Dutch architect W. I. van Bakel and built at a cost of 110,000 gulden. The church grew extensively over the following fifty years, at first dominated by ethnic Europeans and persons of mixed descent but later having a majority indigenous congregation. As the Catholic population grew, the size of the parish diminished as new ones were established.

The church complex consists of, among other things, the church building, a presbytery, and a convent. St. Joseph's itself is highly decorated, including nineteen stained glass windows (including three dedicated to church's patron saint, Joseph), carvings showing the fourteen Stations of the Cross, and an altar imported from Germany. The single tower is home to two bells produced by Petit & Fritsen.

== History ==
=== Catholicism in Semarang ===
The Roman Catholic Church first entered Semarang, Dutch East Indies, in what is now Central Java, Indonesia, in the early 19th century. In 1808 Father Lambertus Prinsen (1777–1840) was sent from the Netherlands to the Indies as the pastor for Semarang and several surrounding settlements, including Salatiga and Klaten. He quickly established a council for handling religious duties, and baptisms began the following year; fourteen people, mostly Dutch, were baptised in 1809. However, this congregation did not have a church in which they could pray. Until 1815 the congregation used the nearby Immanuel Church, a building intended for Protestants. Between 1815 and 1822 services were held at the homes of members of the congregation, then from 7 August 1822 Mass was held at Prinsen's new home (near Immanuel).

The congregation required its own church building, and already owned land which could be used: in 1828 the Catholics had purchased a former hospital and the surrounding land in Gedangan, near the harbour, and established an orphanage there. However, there were insufficient clergy for further development. Mgr. Joseph Lijnen (1815–82), who had become the congregation's pastor in 1858, left the Indies for Heythuysen, Netherlands. There, he convinced several Franciscan nuns to join him in the Indies and develop the congregation through education and ministry. Upon returning to the Indies, designs were made for a church building across from the orphanage and convent established for the nuns.

=== A new church ===
The church was designed by Dutch architect W. I. van Bakel in a neogothic style. The construction costs of 110,000 gulden were funded partly by the colonial government, as well as the sale of unused land and donations from Catholics throughout the colony. The first stone was laid by the pastor Lijnen on 1 October 1870, and construction continued smoothly until 12 May 1873, when the nearly completed tower collapsed; various reasons have been put forward, including an insufficient frame and poor quality bricks. After the collapse, the design of the church was modified to be lower, and further construction was undertaken using bricks imported from the Netherlands as ballast for ships. The construction of the building was completed on 12 December 1875, and the church was blessed by Lijnen. It was the first Catholic church in the city, and served mostly those of European or mixed descent.

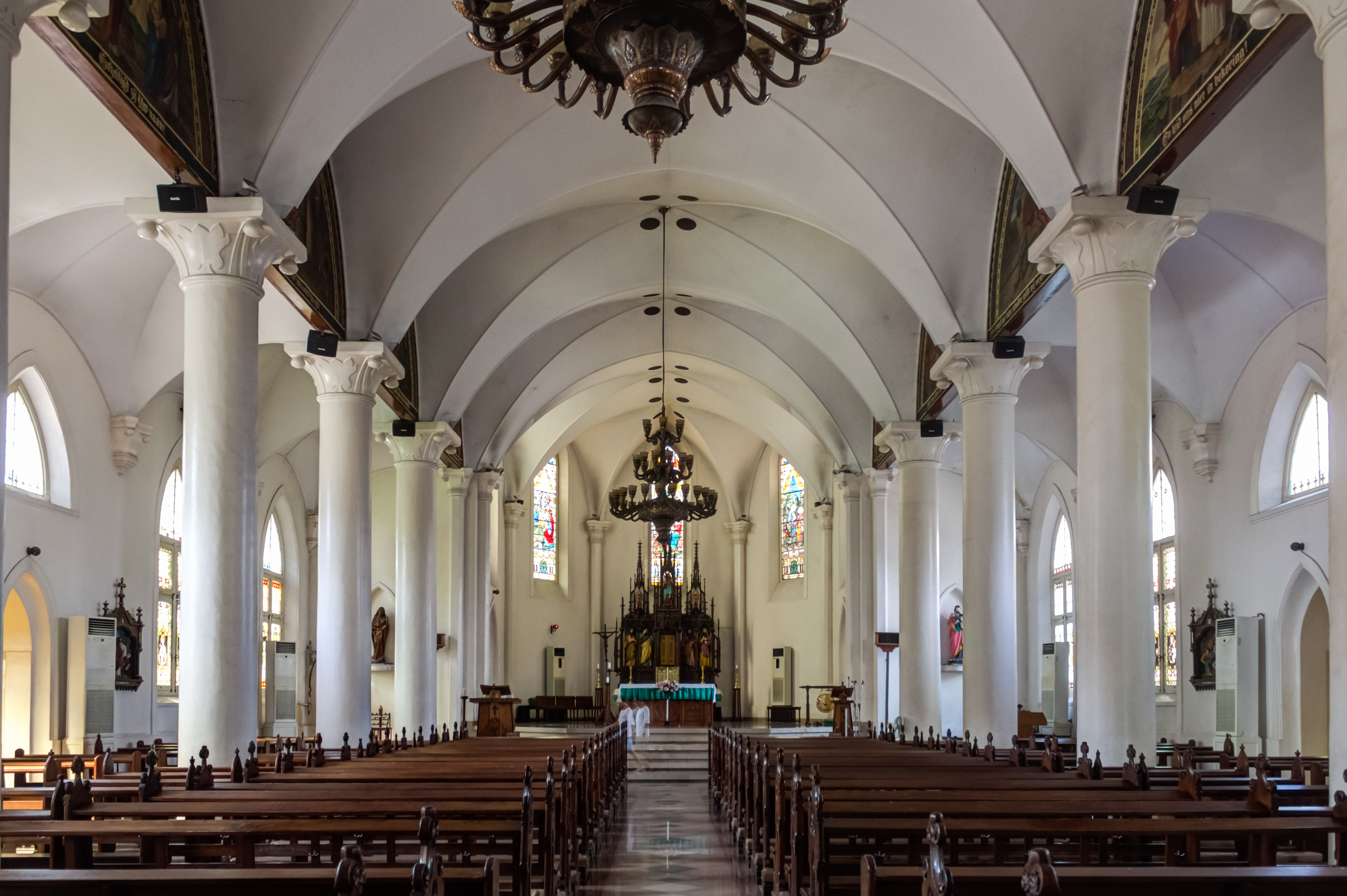
Interior of Gedangan Church

Further additions to the interior were made over the next quarter-century. A new Gothic altar, produced in Düsseldorf, Germany, was installed in 1880. Two years later a communion bench was installed. The tower was also given a clock and bells during this period; the clock was removed in 1978 since the machinery was broken. Lijden died in 1882, and the Jesuit Joannes de Vries became the parish priest, the first in an unbroken line of Jesuit pastors which continues until the present day. De Vries was soon after elected provincial superior for the province, and thus he spent much of his time away from the church. By 1885 there were 1,620 Catholics in Semarang, up from approximately a thousand four years earlier. Many of these were in the colonial military.

J. Keijzer replaced de Vries after the latter's death in 1887 and headed the church for seven years. During his tenure, the church and surrounding grounds were expanded significantly. Construction of a multi-story presbytery began in the 1880s and completed on 1 August 1890. Across the street, in 1888 the nuns established an elementary school, and they also began construction of a chapel for the convent, which was opened on 6 August 1892. During this period the church building received stained glass windows and new pews. Further construction continued into the 20th century. A pipe organ was installed in 1903; it was restored in 1993, but remains in poor condition. Also installed that year were carvings depicting the fourteen Stations of the Cross.

=== Growth and evangelism among the indigenous population ===
At the close of the 19th century the Catholic church in the Indies began targeting the majority-Muslim indigenous population. They were not alone; Protestant missionaries such as Sierk Coolsma of the Netherlands Missionary Union and Mattheus Teffer of the Netherlands Missionary Society had had some success with the Sundanese in Cianjur and Javanese in Ambarawa, respectively. Keijzer, before stepping down as head pastor in 1894, sent a letter to the Netherlands asking that men be sent to learn the Javanese language, to enable them to preach to the people and translate the catechism and some prayer books.

Three Jesuits were sent - P. Hebrans in 1895 and P. Hoevanaars and Frans van Lith (1863–1926) in 1896. The three studied Javanese in Gedangan over a period of a year. Ultimately van Lith was the most successful, establishing a school in Muntilan to train teachers, who were hoped to further spread Catholicism through their teaching duties. This eventually led to the establishment of the Kanisius Foundation, which established a number of Catholic schools throughout Java. Furthermore, in 1904 he spearheaded a mass baptism at Kalibawang, Kulon Progo, near Yogyakarta. A total of 168 Javanese were baptised. Van Lith's efforts eventually returned to Semarang, where he established a Kanisius school in the parish of Gedangan in 1924.

By the early 20th century the Catholic population of Semarang had become large enough to support multiple parishes. In 1915 the chapel in Karangpanas, in the southern part of Semarang, was elevated to the status of parish church and dedicated to St. Athanasius. A third church, in the Randusari area of western Semarang, was established in 1927 and became a parish church in 1930. Further parishes were established over the following decades, until in 2000 St. Joseph's Church was one of nine parish churches in the city, serving the subdistricts of East Semarang, Genuk, Sayung, and parts of North Semarang.

In 1940, under recommendation of Mgr. Petrus Willekens, the Apostolic Vicariate of Batavia was divided in two; Semarang became the capital of the new vicariate. The newly appointed vicar apostolic, Mgr. Albertus Soegijapranata (1896–1963), had his seat at the church in Randusari, but lived in the presbytery in Gedangan.

=== After the colonial period ===
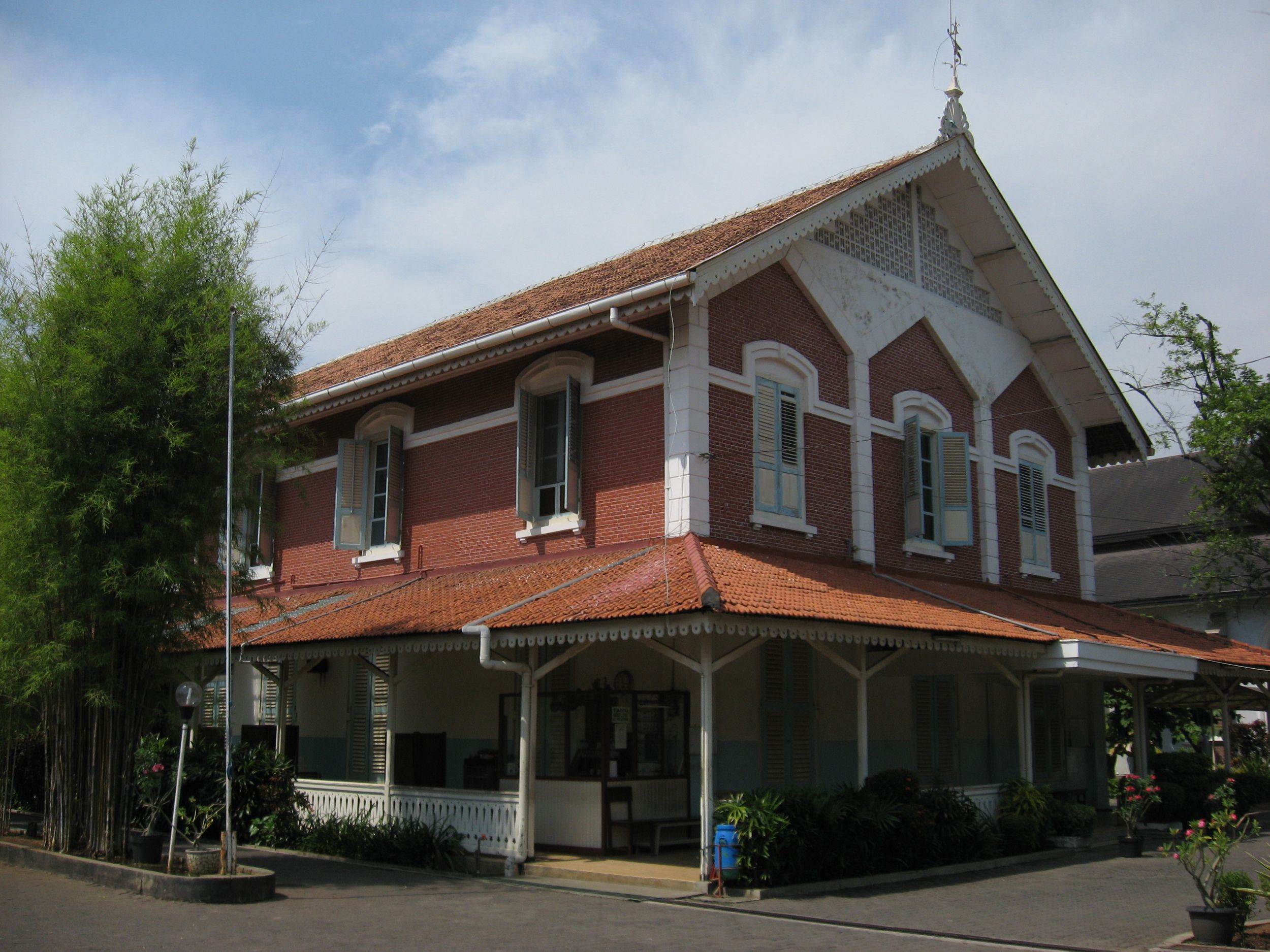
During the Japanese occupation, the clergy prevented seizure of the presbytery.

In March 1942 the Indies were occupied by the Empire of Japan. The occupation government captured numerous (mostly Dutch) men and women, both clergy and laymen, and instituted policies that changed how services were held. They forbade the use of Dutch in services and in writing, and seized several church properties; several others, including the presbytery at Gedangan, were protected by the clergy. After two European head pastors, G. Schoonhoff and G. de Quay, were confined, ultimately on 27 August 1943 the ethnic Javanese Soegijapranata took on parish duties in addition to his work as vicar apostolic. Although he promoted non-compliance with Japanese demands considered damaging to the church, Soegijapranata also endorsed some collaboration. For instance, on 28 February 1944 a Latin-language Mass was delivered at Gedangan by Paul Aijiro Yamaguchi, bishop of Nagasaki.

On 17 August 1945, shortly after the atomic bombings of Hiroshima and Nagasaki and with Japan's defeat an increasing certainty, President Sukarno proclaimed the independence of the Indonesian state. During the ongoing revolution against returning Dutch forces, Europeans were detained (although the Dutch head pastors remained). These detentions, and post-revolution politics which decimated the European population in independent Indonesia, ensured that the congregation remained dominated by the Javanese and other indigenous peoples.

Throughout the 1950s and 1960s Gedangan remained a center of Catholic activity in Semarang. The Jesuit provincial superior continued to be placed in the Gedangan presbytery until 1949, when he was moved to the church in Karangpanas, then again from 1954 to 1962 (when he was sent to Karangpanas again). The central offices of the Kanisius Foundation remained on the church grounds until a new office was opened in 1970. Further construction has continued as well: an office building, named Bintang Laut, was completed on 6 August 1988, and renovations to the church building took place in the early 1990s. The church continues to hold regular services, including five on Sundays.

== Description ==
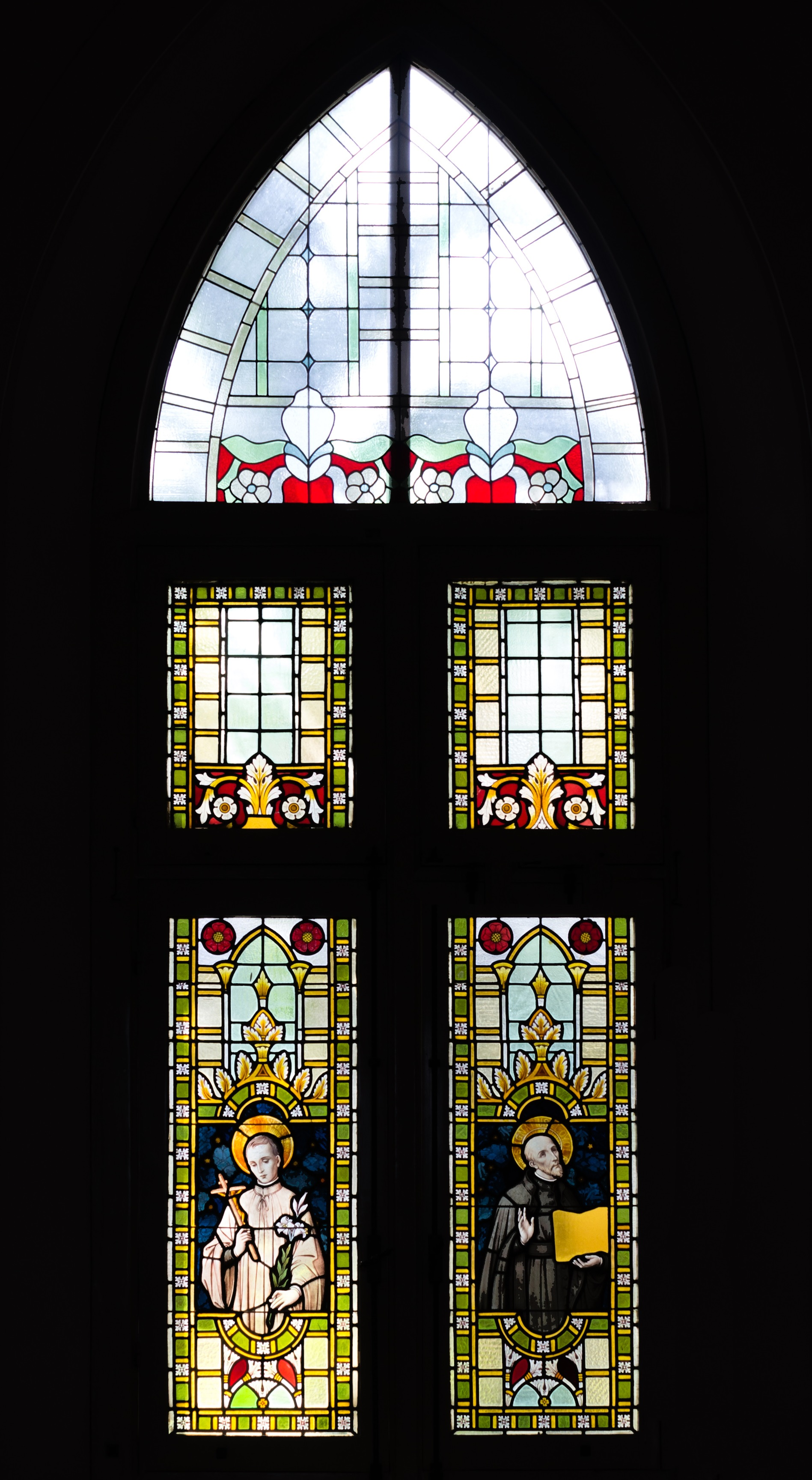
One of the church's stained glass windows

St. Joseph's Church is located on the east side of Ronggowarsito Street in Semarang, Central Java. Administratively, it is part of the parish of St. Joseph in the Archdiocese of Semarang. The red-brick building can seat 800 people. It faces west and has windows on all sides, as well as five entrances (two on the north side, two on the south side, and one on the west side). The roof is a white cross-ribbed vault supported by ionic columns.

The interior of the church has nineteen stained glass windows, three behind the altar and eight along each side of the church building. The windows behind the altar focus on St. Joseph and depict, from right to left, the sojourn of the Holy Family in Egypt; the daily lives of the Holy Family; and the death of Joseph. Four of the sixteen windows on the sides of the church (those closest to the altar and those closest to the doors) depict lilies. The remaining twelve windows each depict a single saint, including Ignatius of Loyola, Stanislaus Kostka, and Saint Cecilia. Further ornamentation of the walls includes carvings depicting the fourteen Stations of the Cross as well as twelve triforiums holding paintings illustrating the Lord's Prayer, the Bread of Life Discourse, and praise to Christ and Mary. On top of the altar, at the eastern end of the church, is a tabernacle. The altar, imported from Germany in 1880, is decorated with statues of Abraham, Peter, Paul, and Melchizedek.

The tower is home to two cast iron bells, one measuring 93.5 centimetres (36.8 in) in height and 90 centimetres (35 in) wide at the base, and the other measuring 75 centimetres (30 in) in height and 70 centimetres (28 in) in diameter at the base. The bells were produced by Petit & Fritsen in April 1882 and exported from Rotterdam by the Caminada brothers. Both are inscribed with a dedication, in Latin, stating that the bells were donated by a Semarang-born Frenchman named Joseph Andrieux. The bells are further decorated with engraved plants and crosses. When the bells were installed in 1882, they were accompanied by a clock. However, over the years the machinery wore down, and in 1978 it was replaced with a round face decorated with the Christogram IHS (short for "Iesus Hominum Salvator", meaning "Jesus, Saviour of Men").

To the north of the church proper is a presbytery, established on 1 August 1890. The two-story building has a high foundation and marble flooring. Both stories have high ceilings, 4 metres (13 ft) above the floor. Further to the north is the Bintang Laut building, containing offices for the parish council and other administrative needs. On the west side of Ronggo Warsito Street is a convent for the Franciscan nuns, which has a neo-Gothic chapel.

== See also ==
- List of church buildings in Indonesia

== Works cited ==
- Adi, A. Kresna (2011). Soedirman: Bapak Tentara Indonesia [Soedirman: Father of the Indonesian Military] (in Indonesian). Yogyakarta: Mata Padi Pressindo. ISBN 978-602-95337-1-2.
- Aritonang, Jan S.; Steenbrink, Karel A., eds. (2008). A History of Christianity in Indonesia. Studies in Christian Mission. Vol. 35. Leiden: Brill. ISBN 978-90-04-17026-1.
- "Jadwal Misa" [Schedule for Mass] (in Indonesian). Gereja Gedangan. Archived from the original on 17 July 2014.
- Moeryantini, Henricia (1975). Mgr. Albertus Soegijapranata S.J (in Indonesian). Ende: Nusa Indah. OCLC 7245258.
- Parochial Council (2000). Sejarah Gereja St. Yusup Gedangan dalam Rangka Peringatan 125 Th Gedung Gereja [History of St. Joseph's Church, Gedangan, in Commemoration of the 125th Anniversary of the Church Building] (in Indonesian). Semarang: St. Joseph's Church.
- Setiabudi, Leonardo (2013). "Studi Gaya Desain Interior Gereja Katolik Santo Yusuf Ronggowarsito dan Kapel Susteran OSF di Gedangan Semarang" [An Interior Design Study of Saint Joseph's Catholic Church and the OSF Convent Chapel in Gedangan, Semarang]. Intra (in Indonesian). 1 (2). Petra Christian University: 1–11.
- "Sejarah Singkat" [Short History] (in Indonesian). Gereja Gedangan.
- Steenbrink, Karel A. (2003). Catholics in Indonesia, 1808–1900. Vol. 1. Leiden: KITLV Press. ISBN 978-90-6718-141-9.
- Subanar, G. Budi (2003). Soegija, Si Anak Bethleham van Java [Soegija, the Son of the Javanese Bethlehem] (in Indonesian). Yogyakarta: Kanisius. ISBN 978-979-21-0727-2.
- Widiarto, Arie (23 December 2003). "Patung Tahun 1880 Masih Berdiri Megah" [Statues from 1880 Still Standing Strong]. Suara Merdeka (in Indonesian). Archived from the original on 18 June 2013.
