= Justinus Darmojuwono =

Catholic cardinal

His Eminence Justinus Darmojuwono
- Cardinal, Archbishop of Semarang
- Church: Catholic Church
- Archdiocese: Semarang
- Appointed: 10 December 1963
- Term ended: 3 July 1981
- Predecessor: Albertus Soegijapranata
- Successor: Julius Darmaatmadja
- Other posts: Military Vicar of Indonesia (1964‍–‍1983); President of the Supreme Council of Indonesian Bishops (1967‍–‍1980); Cardinal Priest of Santi Nomi di Gesù e Maria (1967‍–‍1994)

Orders
- Ordination: 25 May 1947 by Albertus Soegijapranata
- Consecration: 6 April 1964 by Ottavio De Liva
- Created cardinal: 26 June 1967 by Pope Paul VI
- Rank: Cardinal priest

Personal details
- Born: Djamin; 2 November 1914 Sleman, Dutch East Indies
- Died: 3 February 1994 (aged 79) Semarang, Indonesia
- Buried: Kerkhof Muntilan
- Education: Pontifical Gregorian University
- Motto: In Te confido (Latin for 'I trust in You')

Justinus Darmojuwono (2 November 1914 – 3 February 1994) was an Indonesian cardinal of the Roman Catholic Church. He served as Archbishop of Semarang from 1963 to 1981 and was elevated to the rank of cardinal in 1967, becoming the first Indonesian to be a cardinal.

== Early life ==
Justinus Darmojuwono was born in Klewonan, Godean, Yogyakarta to Surodikira and Ngatinah. He and his family worked together to fulfill their daily needs. He was a Muslim, but converted to Catholicism in 1932 following his brother's conversion. He did not seek his father’s permission to be a priest but, because of his persistence, was allowed to enter the seminary on 30 September 1935. After he graduated from the minor seminary of Mertoyudan, Magelang, he continued to the major seminary of St. Paul, Yogyakarta. He was ordained priest by Mgr. Soegijapranata in Kotabaru, Yogyakarta, in 1947. He also studied at the Pontifical Gregorian University in Rome.

== As priest ==
After ordination, he was first appointed to serve at Kidul Loji Church, Yogyakarta, for 35 days. Then he was sent to Ganjuran Church to take care of seminary students, because the minor seminary was destroyed and the Vicar Apostolic of Semarang sent the seminarians to the Ganjuran church. In the middle of 1950, Darmojuwono was appointed to serve at St. Mary of Assumption Church, Klaten, and also to serve as a military curate. At the time, the military commander was Suharto, later the president of Indonesia.

From Klaten he moved to Surakarta in 1952. After a few months in Surakarta, he was ordered to study missiology at Pontifical Gregorian University, Rome. After he returned from Rome, he became a curate in Purbayan, Surakarta, and also served as a military chaplain. Then he was sent to establish a new church in 1961 and became its pastor. The church was later named Maria Regina Purbawardayan Church.

In 1962, he was appointed to serve as a parish priest at the Semarang Cathedral and also as Vicar General of the Archdiocese of Semarang. Then Archbishop of Semarang Mgr. Soegijapranata died on a trip to attend the Second Vatican Council. Darmojuwono was appointed Archbishop of Semarang by Pope Paul VI on 10 December 1963, and consecrated archbishop by the Apostolic Nuncio Archbishop Ottavio De Liva on 6 April 1964.

== As archbishop ==
He was received by President Sukarno at Merdeka Palace immediately after being ordained archbishop of Semarang in 1964. The President often called him "Romo Agung" (Great Clergyman), but he preferred to be called "Romo" (Clergyman).

As an archbishop, he attended the third and fourth sessions of Second Vatican Council. When he attended the third Council session, Indonesia was in grave danger. The 30 September Movement tragedy happened in 1965, and Darmojuwono was ordered to go home as soon as possible. He followed the news about the G30S tragedy from abroad, and the news was devastating. Many people were killed at the time.

== As cardinal ==
Styles of Justinus Darmojuwono
- Reference style: His Eminence
- Spoken style: Your Eminence
- Informal style: Cardinal
- See: Semarang (Emeritus)

He was appointed Cardinal-Priest of Ss. Nome di Gesù e Maria in Via Lata by Pope Paul VI on 26 June 1967, as a member of the College of Cardinals. The ordination was done in the Sistine Chapel. He was appointed cardinal together with Karol Wojtyla from Poland, who later became Pope John Paul II. He said that he was appointed cardinal because he was a Head of Supreme Council of Indonesian Bishops (MAWI), and the Head of MAWI is the primus inter pares. He attended the Papal Conclave in August 1978 which appointed Pope John Paul I, and the Papal Conclave in October 1978 which appointed Pope John Paul II. He had been a member of Pontifical Council for Dialogue with Non-Believers. When Pope Paul VI visited Manila in 1970, he lobbied widely, together with Bishop Labayen from the Philippines and Cardinal Stephen Kim Sou-hwan from South Korea, for the establishment of Federation of Asian Bishops' Conferences. Darmojuwono as a member of the Standing Committee of that conference, and so attended FABC meetings outside the country. Almost all Catholics in Asia at the time knew him from his lobbying in many countries. He resigned from his post as Archbishop of Semarang in 1981 because of health reasons, and settled at the Santa Maria Fatima Church in Banyumanik, Semarang.

== Death ==
He became a consecrator for 13 bishops in Indonesia and was a Cardinal for 29 years. Mgr. Justinus Darmojuwono died on 3 February 1994 in Semarang, Indonesia. He was buried at Kerkhoof Muntilan cemetery, beside other prominent Catholics like Van Lith, SJ, and RD. Sandjaja.

== See also ==
- Cardinal electors in the 1978 papal conclaves

Catholic Church titles
Preceded by Albertus Soegijapranata	Military Vicar of Indonesia; 1964–1983	Succeeded by Julius Darmaatmadja
Preceded by Albertus Soegijapranata	Archbishop of Semarang; 1963–1981	Succeeded by Julius Darmaatmadja
Preceded by Albertus Soegijapranata	Chair of the Supreme Council of Indonesian Bishops; 1967–1980	Succeeded by Julius Darmaatmadja
New title	Cardinal Priest of Santi Nomi di Gesù e Maria; 1967–1994	Succeeded by Avery Dulles
