= Albertus Soegijapranata =

Indonesian Catholic archbishop (1896–1963)

The Most Reverend Albertus Soegijapranata SJ
- Archbishop of Semarang
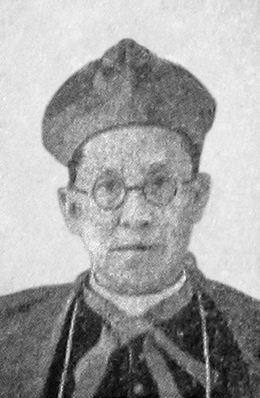
- Soegijapranata in 1960
- Church: Catholic Church
- Archdiocese: Semarang
- Appointed: 1 August 1940 (as apostolic vicar)
- Installed: 3 January 1961 (as archbishop)
- Term ended: 22 July 1963
- Predecessor: Position established
- Successor: Justinus Darmojuwono
- Other posts: Titular Bishop of Danaba (1940‍–‍1961); Military Vicar of Indonesia (1949‍–‍1963); President of the Supreme Council of Indonesian Bishops (1958‍–‍1963)

Orders
- Ordination: 15 August 1931 by Laurentius Schrijnen
- Consecration: 6 October 1940 by Petrus Willekens

Personal details
- Born: Soegija; 25 November 1896 Soerakarta, Dutch East Indies
- Died: 22 July 1963 (aged 66) Steyl, Netherlands
- Buried: Giri Tunggal Heroes' Cemetery
- Education: Xaverius College; Berchmann College
- Motto: In nomine Jesu (Latin for 'In the name of Jesus')

Albertus Soegijapranata SJ (Indonesian: [alˈbərtʊs suˈɡijapraˈnata]; Perfected Spelling: Albertus Sugiyapranata; 25 November 1896 – 22 July 1963), better known by his birth name Soegija, was a Jesuit priest who became the Apostolic Vicar of Semarang and later its archbishop. He was the first native Indonesian bishop and known for his pro-nationalistic stance, often expressed as "100% Catholic 100% Indonesian".

Soegija was born in Surakarta, Dutch East Indies, to a Muslim courtier and his wife. The family moved to nearby Yogyakarta when Soegija was still young; there he began his education. Known as a bright child, around 1909 he was asked by Father Frans van Lith to enter Xaverius College, a Jesuit school in Muntilan, where Soegija slowly became interested in Catholicism. He was baptised on 24 December 1910. After graduating from Xaverius in 1915 and spending a year as a teacher there, Soegija spent two years at the on-site seminary before going to the Netherlands in 1919. He began his two-year novitiate with the Society of Jesus in September 1920 in Grave, and finished his juniorate there in 1923. After three years studying philosophy at Berchmann College in Oudenbosch, he was sent back to Muntilan as a teacher for a further two years. In 1928, he returned to the Netherlands to study theology at Maastricht, where he was ordained by Bishop of Roermond Laurentius Schrijnen on 15 August 1931; Soegija then added the word "pranata" to the back of his name. He was then sent back to the Indies to preach and became a parochial vicar at the parish in Kidul Loji, Yogyakarta, and in 1934 he was given his own parish in Bintaran. There he focused on creating a sense of Catholicism within the native community, emphasising the need for strong bonds between Catholic families. Soegijapranata was consecrated as the vicar apostolic of the newly established Apostolic Vicariate of Semarang in 1940.

Although the population of native Catholics expanded greatly in the years following his consecration, Soegijapranata was soon faced with numerous trials. The Empire of Japan invaded the Indies beginning in early 1942, and during the ensuing occupation numerous churches were seized and clergymen were arrested or killed. Soegijapranata was able to resist several of these seizures, and spent the rest of the occupation serving the Catholics in his vicariate. After President Sukarno proclaimed the country's independence in August 1945, Semarang was overcome with unrest. Soegijapranata helped broker a ceasefire after a five-day battle between Japanese and Indonesian troops and called for the central government to send someone to deal with the unrest and food shortages in the city. However, these problems continued to grow, and in 1947 Soegijapranata moved his seat to Yogyakarta. For the remainder of the national revolution Soegijapranata worked to promote international recognition of Indonesia's independence. Soon after the Dutch, who had returned in late 1945, recognised the country's independence, Soegijapranata returned to Semarang. During the post-revolution years, he wrote extensively against communism and expanded the church; he also served as a mediator between several political factions. He was made an archbishop on 3 January 1961, when Semarang was elevated to an ecclesiastical province. At the time he was in Europe, participating in the first session of the Second Vatican Council. Soegijapranata died in 1963, in Steyl, the Netherlands. His body was flown back to Indonesia, where he was made a national hero and interred at Giri Tunggal Heroes' Cemetery in Semarang.

Soegijapranata continues to be viewed with respect by both Catholic and non-Catholic Indonesians. Several biographies have been written, and in 2012 a fictionalised biographical film by Garin Nugroho, entitled Soegija, was released to popular acclaim. Soegijapranata Catholic University, a large university in Semarang, is named after him.

== Early life ==
Soegija was born on 25 November 1896 in Surakarta to Karijosoedarmo, an abdi dalem (courtier) at the Sunanate of Surakarta, and his wife Soepiah. The family was abangan Muslim, and Soegija's grandfather Soepa was a kyai; Soegija followed their religion. Soegija – whose name was derived from the Javanese word soegih, meaning rich – was the fifth of nine children. The family later moved to Ngabean, Yogyakarta. There, Karijosoedarmo began to serve as a courtier at the Kraton Ngayogyakarta Hadiningrat to Sultan Hamengkubuwono VII, while his wife sold fish; despite this, the family was poor and sometimes had little food. Soegija was a daring child, quick to fight, skilled at football, and noted for his intellect from a young age. While Soegija was still young, his father made him fast in accordance with Islamic law.

Soegija started his formal education at a school in the Kraton complex, known locally as a Sekolah Angka Loro (Number Two School), where he learned to read and write. He later transferred to a school in Wirogunan, Yogyakarta, near Pakualaman. Beginning in his third year he attended a Dutch-run school for native Indonesians (Hollands Inlands School) in Lempuyangan. Outside of school he studied gamelan and singing with his parents. Around 1909 he was asked by Father Frans van Lith to join the Jesuit school in Muntilan, 30 kilometres (19 mi) north-west of Yogyakarta. Although his parents were initially worried that Soegija would become too Europeanised, they agreed.

== Xaverius College ==
In 1909 Soegija started at the Xaverius College in Muntilan, a school for aspiring teachers, and stayed in the dormitory. (Note: van Klinken (2003, p. 53) writes that all pre-revolution Catholic elite, including the future bishop Adrianus Djajasepoetra and the Catholic party head I. J. Kasimo, were alumni of Xaverius.) He was one of 54 students in his year. The boys followed a strict schedule, attending classes in the morning and engaging in other activities, such as gardening, discussions, and chess, in the afternoon. The Catholic students had regular prayers. Although the college did not require students to be Catholic, Soegija was pressured by his Catholic classmates, leading to several fights. Feeling dissatisfied, Soegija complained to his teacher that the Dutch priests were like merchants, thinking only of money. The priest replied that the teachers were unpaid and only hoped for the students' good. This led Soegija to better respect the priests, and when van Rijckevorsel told the other students that Soegija did not want to be Catholic, they stopped pressuring him.

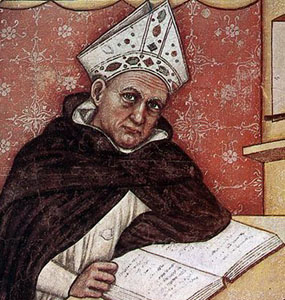
Albertus Magnus, a 13th-century saint; Soegija based his baptismal name on that of Albertus

The following year Soegija asked to join the Catholic-education classes, citing a desire to fully use the facilities at Xaverius. His teacher, Father Mertens, told Soegija that he required permission from his parents first; although they refused, Soegija was nevertheless allowed to study Catholicism. He was intrigued by the Trinity, and asked several of the priests for clarification. Van Lith cited the works of Thomas Aquinas, while Mertens discussed the Trinity as explained by Augustine of Hippo; the latter told him that humans were not meant to understand God with their limited knowledge. Soegija, who wanted to learn more, asked to be baptised, quoting the Finding in the Temple to show why he should not need his parents' permission. The priests agreed, and Soegija was baptised on 24 December 1910, taking the baptismal name Albertus, for Albertus Magnus. During the Christmas holidays, he told his family that he had converted. Although his immediate family eventually accepted this, and may have eventually supported him, (Note: Soegija's younger sister reportedly attended a Catholic-run girls' school in Muntilan until her death, which Subanar suggests shows the family supported Soegija's choice (Subanar 2003, p. 41).) Soegija's other relatives refused to speak to him afterwards.

Soegija and the students continued their education at Xaverius, receiving further instruction. According to Father G. Budi Subanar, a lecturer on theology at Sanata Dharma University, during this period one of the teachers taught the Fourth Commandment, "Honour your father and your mother, that your days may be long in the land which the Lord your God gives you.", as relating not only to one's birth father and mother, but all who had come before; this left the students with nationalistic tendencies. On another occasion, a visit by a Capuchin missionary – who was physically quite different from the Jesuit teachers (Note: Subanar (2003, pp. 46–48) suggests that the Capuchin's beard and darker skin, juxtaposed against the paleness of the Jesuits, made Soegija realise that he could become a priest.) – led Soegija to consider becoming a priest, an idea which his parents accepted. In 1915 Soegija finished his education at Xaverius, but stayed on as a teacher. The following year he joined the on-site seminary, one of three native Indonesians who entered the seminary that year. He graduated in 1919, having studied French, Latin, Greek, and literature.

== Path to priesthood ==
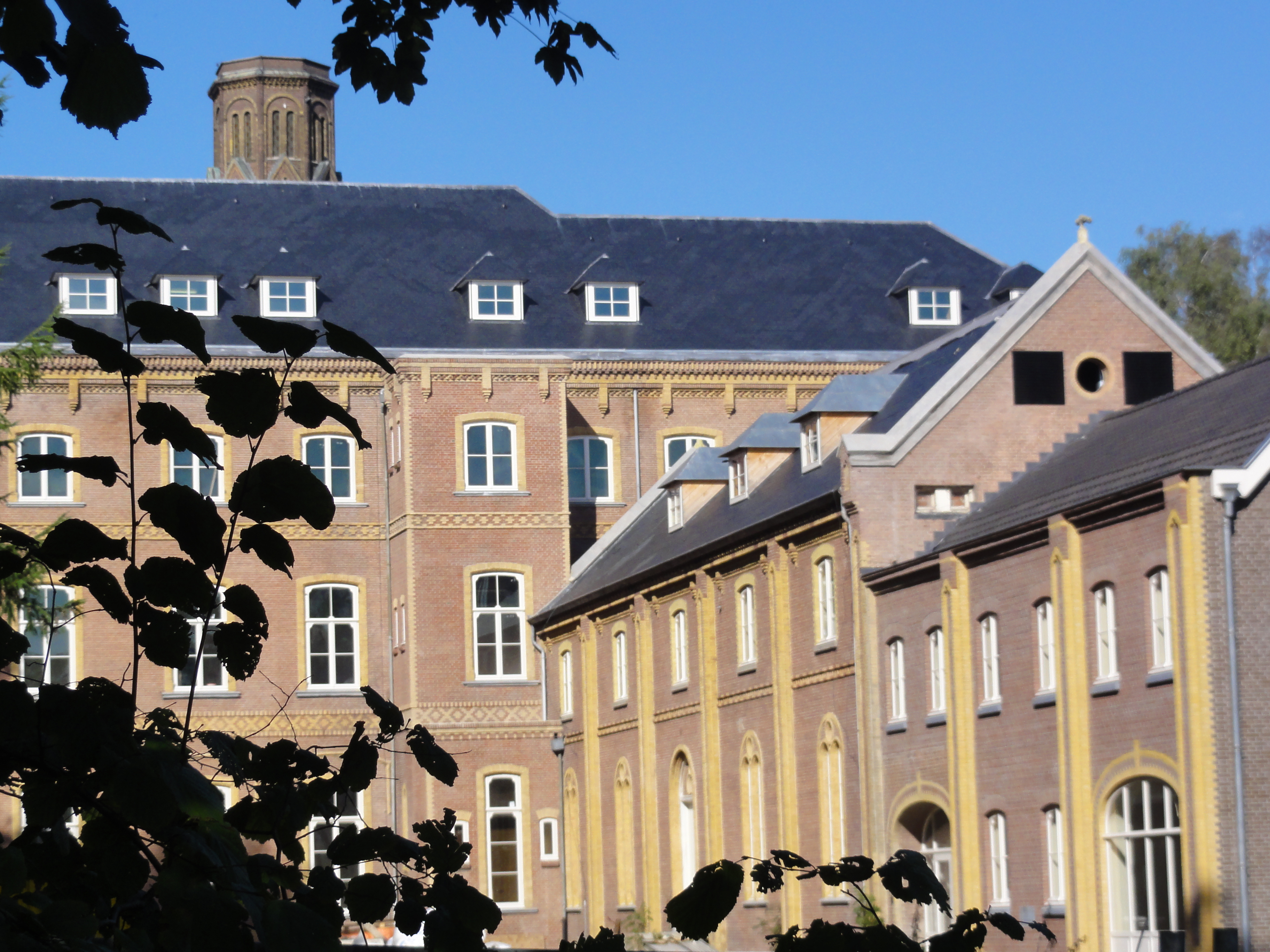
Soegija spent his novitiate at Mariëndaal, in Grave, the Netherlands

Soegija and his classmates sailed to Uden, in the Netherlands, to further their studies in 1919. In Uden Soegija spent a year further studying Latin and Greek, necessary for his preaching back in the Indies. He and his classmates adapted to Dutch culture. On 27 September 1920 Soegija began his novitiate to join the Jesuits, the first of his classmates. (Note: Soemarno and Hardjasoewondo began their novitiates in 1921, along with four other Javanese. Later novitiates would be held in Yogyakarta (Subanar 2003, pp. 65–67).) While completing his studies at Mariëndaal in Grave, he was separated from much of the world and spent his time in introspection. He completed his novitiate on 22 September 1922 and was initiated into the Jesuits, taking their oath of poverty, chastity and obedience.

After joining the Jesuits Soegija spent another year in Mariëndaal in juniorate. Beginning in 1923 he studied philosophy at Berchmann College in Oudenbosch; during this time he examined the teachings of Thomas Aquinas and began writing on Christianity. In a letter dated 11 August 1923, he wrote that the Javanese were so far unable to discern between Catholics and Protestants, and that the best way to convert the Javanese was by deeds, not words. He also translated some of the results of the 27th International Eucharistic Congress, held in Amsterdam in 1924, for the Javanese-language magazine Swaratama, which circulated mainly among Xaverius alumni. Several of Soegija's other writings were published in St. Claverbond, Berichten uit Java. He graduated from Berchmann in 1926, then began preparations to return to the Indies.

Soegija arrived in Muntilan in September 1926, where he began teaching algebra, religion, and Javanese at Xaverius. Little is known about his period as an instructor at the school, although records indicate that he based his teaching style on that of van Lith, who had died in early 1926, explaining religious concepts in terms based on Javanese tradition. He supervised the school's gamelan and gardening programs and became the chief editor of Swaratama. Soegijapranata wrote editorials that covered a variety of topics, including condemnations of communism and discussions of various aspects of poverty.

After two years at Xaverius, in August 1928, Soegija returned to the Netherlands, where he studied theology at Maastricht. On 3 December 1929 he and four other Asian Jesuits joined Jesuit General Wlodzimierz Ledóchowski in a meeting with Pope Pius XI in Vatican City; the pope told the Asian men that they were to be the "backbones" of Catholicism in their respective nations. Soegija was made a deacon in May 1931; he was ordained by Bishop of Roermond Laurentius Schrijnen on 15 August 1931, while still studying theology. (Note: The first Javanese pastor had been ordained in 1927 (Gonggong 2012, p. 17). Another Javanese Jesuit, Reksatmadja, was ordained in the same ceremony (Subanar 2003, p. 90).) After his ordination, Soegija appended the word pranata, meaning "prayer" or "hope", as a suffix to his birth name; such additions were a common practice in Javanese culture after its bearer reached an important milestone. He finished his theology studies in 1932 and in 1933 spent his tertianship in Drongen, Belgium. That year he wrote an autobiography, entitled La Conversione di un Giavanese (The Conversion of a Javanese); the work was released in Italian, Dutch, and Spanish.

== Preaching ==
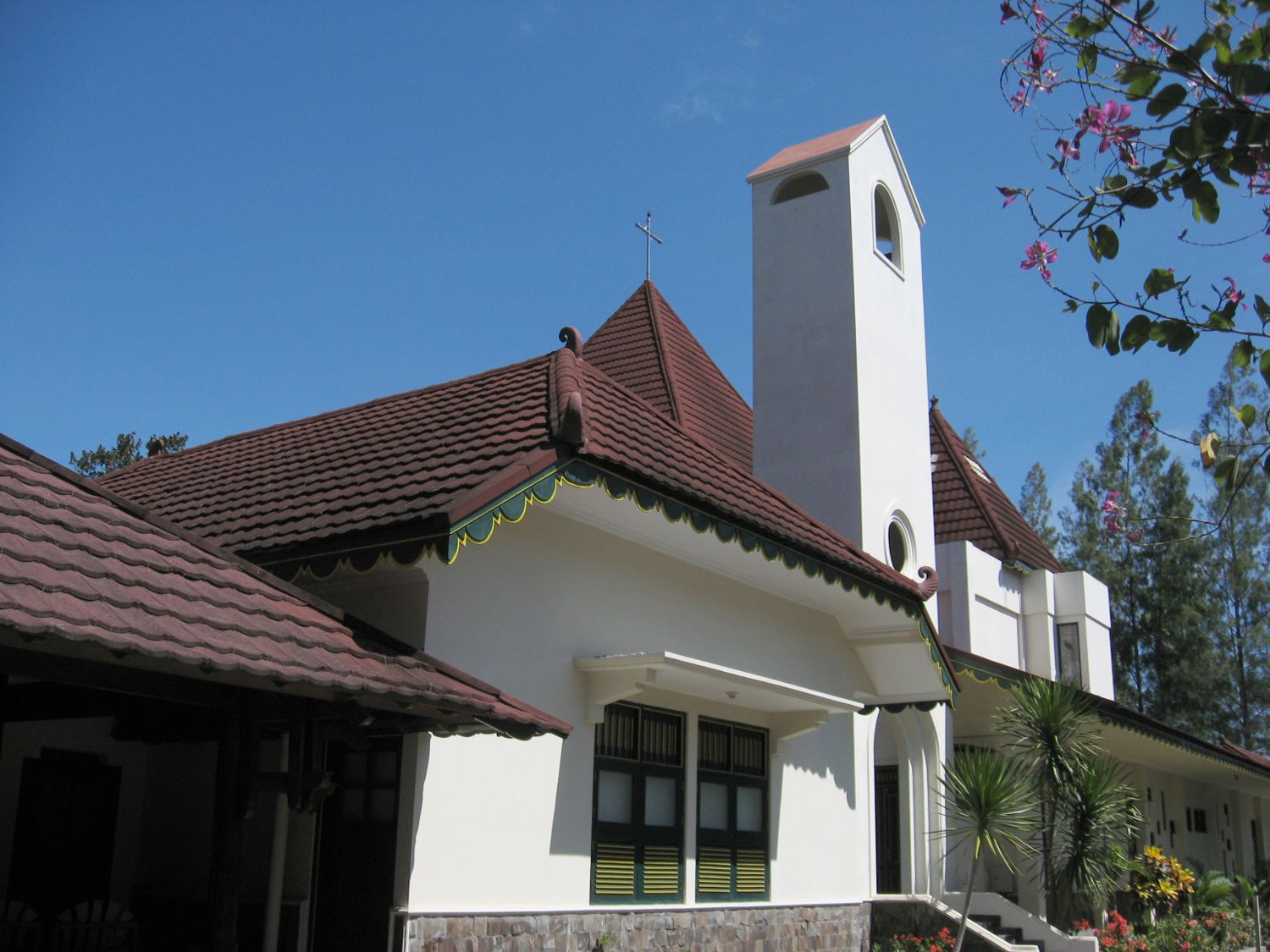
The parish church in Ganjuran, which Soegijapranata served concurrently with Bintaran

On 8 August 1933 Soegijapranata and two fellow priests departed for the Indies; Soegijapranata was assigned to preach at Kidul Loji in Yogyakarta, near Kraton. He served as parochial vicar for Father van Driessche, one of his teachers from Xaverius. The elder priest taught Soegijapranata how to better address the needs of his parish, while van Driessche likely used Soegijapranata to preach to the city's growing native Catholic population. (Note: In 1933 the Javanese Catholic population of Yogyakarta was 7,092, up from a total of six 30 years earlier (Subanar 2003, p. 102).) Soegijapranata was, by this point, a short and chubby man with what the Dutch historian Geert Arend van Klinken described as "a boyish sense of humour that won him many friends".

After the St Yoseph Church in Bintaran, about 1 kilometre (0.62 mi) from Kidul Loji, opened in April 1934, Soegijapranata was transferred there to become its priest; the church primarily served the Javanese Catholic community. Bintaran was one of four centres of Catholic presence in Yogyakarta at the time, along with Kidul Loji, Kotabaru, and Pugeran; each major church served a wide area, and the priests from the major churches gave sermons in the furthest reaches of their parishes. After van Driessche's death in June 1934, Soegijapranata's duties were extended to include the village of Ganjuran, Bantul, 20 kilometres (12 mi) south of the city, which was home to more than a thousand native Catholics. He was also a spiritual adviser to several local groups and established a Catholic credit union.

The Catholic Church at the time faced difficulty retaining converts. Some Javanese, who had converted as students, returned to Islam after reentering society and facing social ostracism. In a 1935 meeting with other Jesuits, Soegijapranata blamed the problem on the lack of a united Catholic identity, or sensus Catholicus, as well as few intermarriages between native Catholics. Soegijapranata opposed marriage between Catholics and non-Catholics. He counselled young Catholic couples before marriage, believing that these unions helped unite the Catholic families in the city, and continued to write for Swaratama, again serving as its editor in chief. In 1938, he was chosen to advise the Society of Jesus, coordinating Jesuit work in the Indies.

== Vicar apostolic ==
The increasing population of Catholics in the Indies led Mgr. Petrus Willekens, then Vicar Apostolic of Batavia, to suggest that a new apostolic vicariate be established in Central Java, headquartered in Semarang, as the area was culturally different and geographically separate from Batavia (now Jakarta). The Apostolic Vicariate of Batavia was split in two on 25 June 1940; the eastern half became the Apostolic Vicariate of Semarang. On 1 August 1940 Willekens received a telegram from Pro-Secretary of State Giovanni Battista Montini ordering that Soegijapranata be put in charge of the newly established apostolic vicariate. This was forwarded to Soegijapranata in Yogyakarta, who agreed to the appointment, despite being surprised and nervous. His assistant Hardjosoewarno later recalled that Soegijapranata cried after reading the telegram – an uncharacteristic response – and, when eating a bowl of soto, asked if Hardjosoewarno had ever seen a bishop eating the dish.

Soegijapranata left for Semarang on 30 September 1940 and was consecrated by Willekens on 6 October at the Holy Rosary Church in Randusari, which later became his seat; this consecration made Soegijapranata the first native Indonesian bishop. (Note: The second, a Timorese man named Gabriel Manek, was consecrated in 1951 as the Vicar Apostolic of Larantuka (Aritonang & Steenbrink 2008, p. 269).) The ceremony was attended by numerous political figures and sultans from Batavia, Semarang, Yogyakarta, and Surakarta, as well as clergy from Malang and Lampung; Soegijapranata's first act as vicar was to issue a pastoral letter with Willekens that outlined the historical background that led to his appointment, including Pope Benedict XV's apostolic letter Maximum illud which called for more local clergy, and Pope Pius XI and Pope Pius XII's efforts to appoint more pastors and bishops from native ethnic groups worldwide. Soegijapranata began working on the Church hierarchy in the region, establishing new parishes.

In Soegijapranata's apostolic vicariate there were 84 pastors (73 European and 11 native), 137 brothers (103 European and 34 native), and 330 nuns (251 European and 79 native). The vicariate included Semarang, Yogyakarta, Surakarta, Kudus, Magelang, Salatiga, Pati, and Ambarawa; its geographic conditions ranged from the fertile lowlands of the Kedu Plain to the arid Gunung Sewu mountainous area. The vast majority of its population was ethnic Javanese, consisting of more than 15,000 native Catholics, as well as a similar number of European Catholics. The number of native Catholics quickly outpaced the number of European ones, and had doubled by 1942. There were also several Catholic groups, mostly working in education. However, the Indonesian Catholics were less prominent than the Protestants.

=== Japanese occupation ===
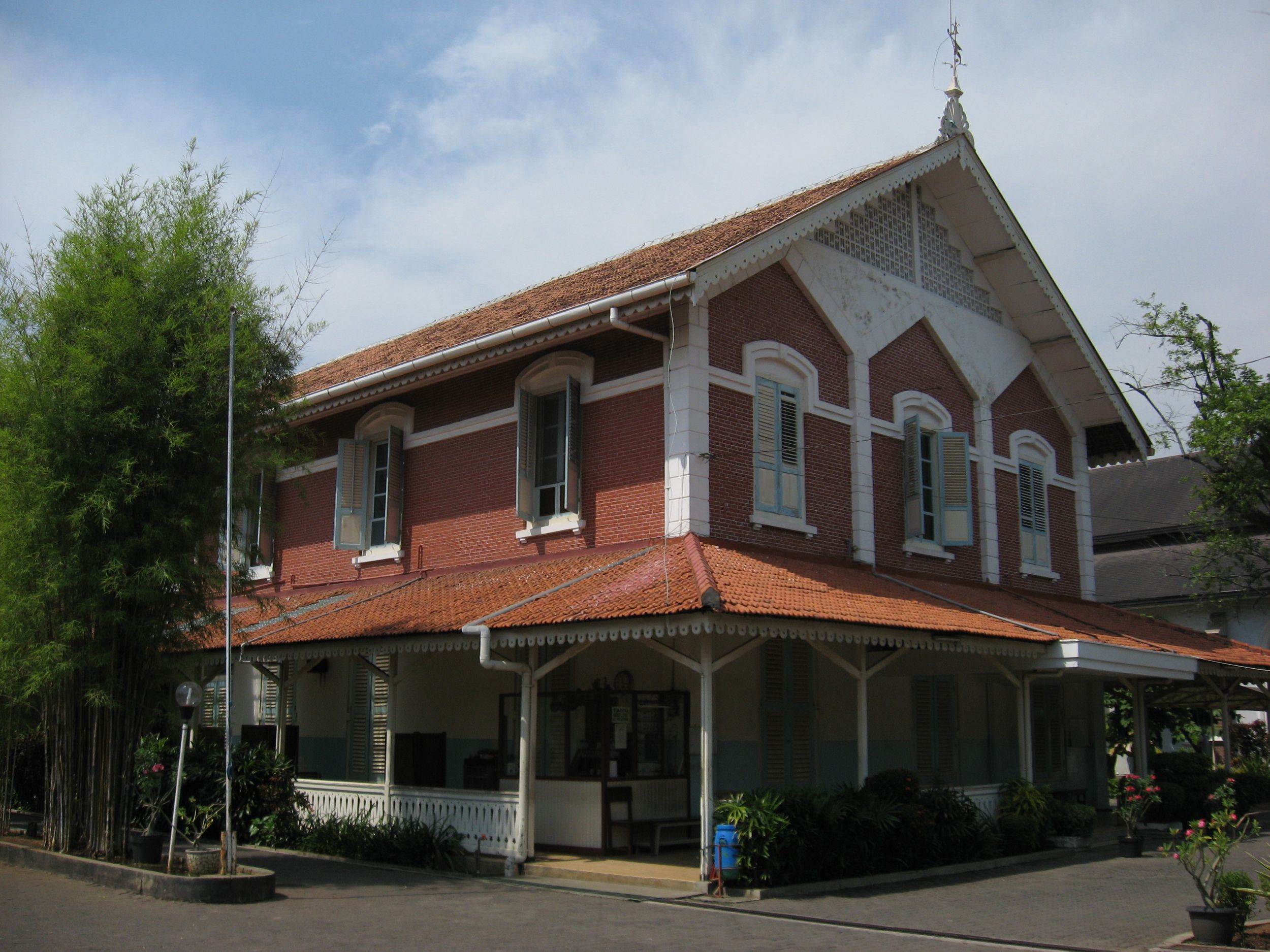
The presbytery at Gedangan, which Soegijapranata prevented the Japanese occupation forces from seizing in 1942

After the Japanese occupied the Indies in early 1942, on 9 March 1942 Governor-General Tjarda van Starkenborgh Stachouwer and head of the Royal Netherlands East Indies Army General Hein ter Poorten capitulated. This brought numerous changes in the governance of the archipelago, reducing the quality of life for non-Japanese. In his diary, Soegijapranata wrote of the invasion that "fires were everywhere ... no soldiers, no police, no workers. The streets are full of burnt out vehicles. ... Luckily least there are still some lawmakers and Catholics out there. They work as representatives of their groups to ensure the city is in order." (Note: Based on Subanar's translation from the original Javanese: "Di mana-mana ada kebakaran ... Tidak ada tentara, tidak ada police, tidak ada pegawai. Di jalanan pun terdapat berbagai bangkai kendaraan yang terbakar ... Untung masih ada beberapa pegawai kejaksaan dan beberapa tokoh Katolik yang tidak pergi. Mereka bekerja dengan mengatasnamakan diri dari instansiyang berwenang untuk mengatur kota agar tercipta suasana rust en order, tertib dan damai.")

The occupation government captured numerous (mostly Dutch) men and women, both clergy and laymen, (Note: Subanar (2003, pp. 155–163) lists 109 Jesuits, 61 members of the Fratrum Immaculatae Conceptionis, and 21 nuns in the Order of Carolus Borromeus imprisoned during the occupation. Twelve pastors were ordained in the Indies in this period.) and instituted policies that changed how services were held. They forbade the use of Dutch in services and in writing and seized several church properties. Soegijapranata attempted to resist these seizures, at times filling the locations with people to make them unmanageable or indicating that other buildings, such as cinemas, would serve Japanese needs better. When the Japanese attempted to seize Randusari Cathedral, Soegijapranata replied that they could take it only after decapitating him; the Japanese later found another location for their office. He prevented the Japanese from taking Gedangan Presbytery, where he lived, and assigned guardians for schools and other facilities to prevent seizure. These efforts were not always successful, however, and several Church-run institutions were seized, as were church funds.

Soegijapranata was unable to prevent Japanese torture of prisoners of war, including the clergy, (Note: Between 1942 and 1945 a total of 74 pastors, 47 brothers, and 160 nuns were killed by the Japanese forces. For example, the Bishop of Maluku and West Papua Giovanni Aerts, along with eleven brothers and clergymen, was summarily executed (Gonggong 2012, p. 50). Some clergy, including Willekens, made use of the Vatican's diplomatic relations with Japan to claim diplomatic status, thus protecting themselves (Subanar 2005, p. 57). However, they planned for the possibility of Willieken's capture; in correspondence between Soegijapranata and Willekens, the two men agreed that Soegijapranata must remain free no matter the consequences (van Klinken 2003, p. 177).) but was himself well-treated by the Japanese forces; he was often invited to Japanese ceremonies, but never attended, sending bouquets in his stead. He used this position of respect to lobby for fair treatment of those interned. He successfully petitioned the Japanese overlords to exempt nuns from the paramilitary draft and allow them to work at hospitals. He and the Catholic populace also gathered food and other supplies for interned clergy, and Soegijapranata kept in contact with the prisoners, supplying and receiving news, such as recent deaths, and other information.

As the number of clergy was severely limited, Soegijapranata roamed from church to church to attend to parishioners, actively preaching and serving as the de facto head of the Catholic Church in the country; this was in part to counteract rumours of his detention by the Japanese. He travelled by foot, bicycle, and carriage, as his car had been seized. He sent pastors to apostolic prefectures in Bandung, Surabaya, and Malang to deal with the lack of clergy there. Soegijapranata worked to ensure that the seminary would continue to produce new pastors and appointed the recently ordained Father Hardjawasita as its rector. He also granted native priests the authority to perform marriages. To calm the Catholic populace, he visited their homes and convinced them that the streets were safe.

=== Indonesian National Revolution ===
After the atomic bombings of Hiroshima and Nagasaki and the proclamation of Indonesian independence in August 1945, the Japanese began withdrawing from the country. In support of the new Republic, Soegijapranata had an Indonesian flag flown in front of the Gedangan Rectory; however, he did not formally recognise the nation's independence, owing to his correspondence with Willekens regarding the Church's neutrality. He and his clergy treated injured Dutch missionaries, who had recently been released from internment, at the rectory. The Dutch clergy were malnourished, and several required treatment at a hospital. Some were later taken to Indonesian-run internment camps, but the Catholics were still allowed to look after them. Meanwhile, inter-religious strife led to the burning of several mission buildings and the murder of some clergymen. (Note: In the seminary at Muntilan, for example, the Islamic group Hisboella Youth killed two people (Subanar 2005, p. 72).) The government also took several buildings, and some that had been seized by the Japanese were not returned.

Allied forces sent to disarm the Japanese and repatriate prisoners of war arrived in Indonesia in September 1945. In Semarang, this led to a conflict between Japanese forces and Indonesian rebels, that began on 15 October; the Indonesians aimed to confiscate the Japanese weapons. Allied forces began landing in the city on 20 October 1945; a small group was sent to Gedangan to speak with Soegijapranata. Concerned with civilian suffering, the vicar apostolic told the Allies that they must stop the battle; the Allies could not comply as they did not know the Japanese commander. Soegijapranata then contacted the Japanese and, that afternoon, brokered a cease-fire agreement in his office at Gedangan, despite Indonesian forces' firing at the Gurkha soldiers posted in front of the building.

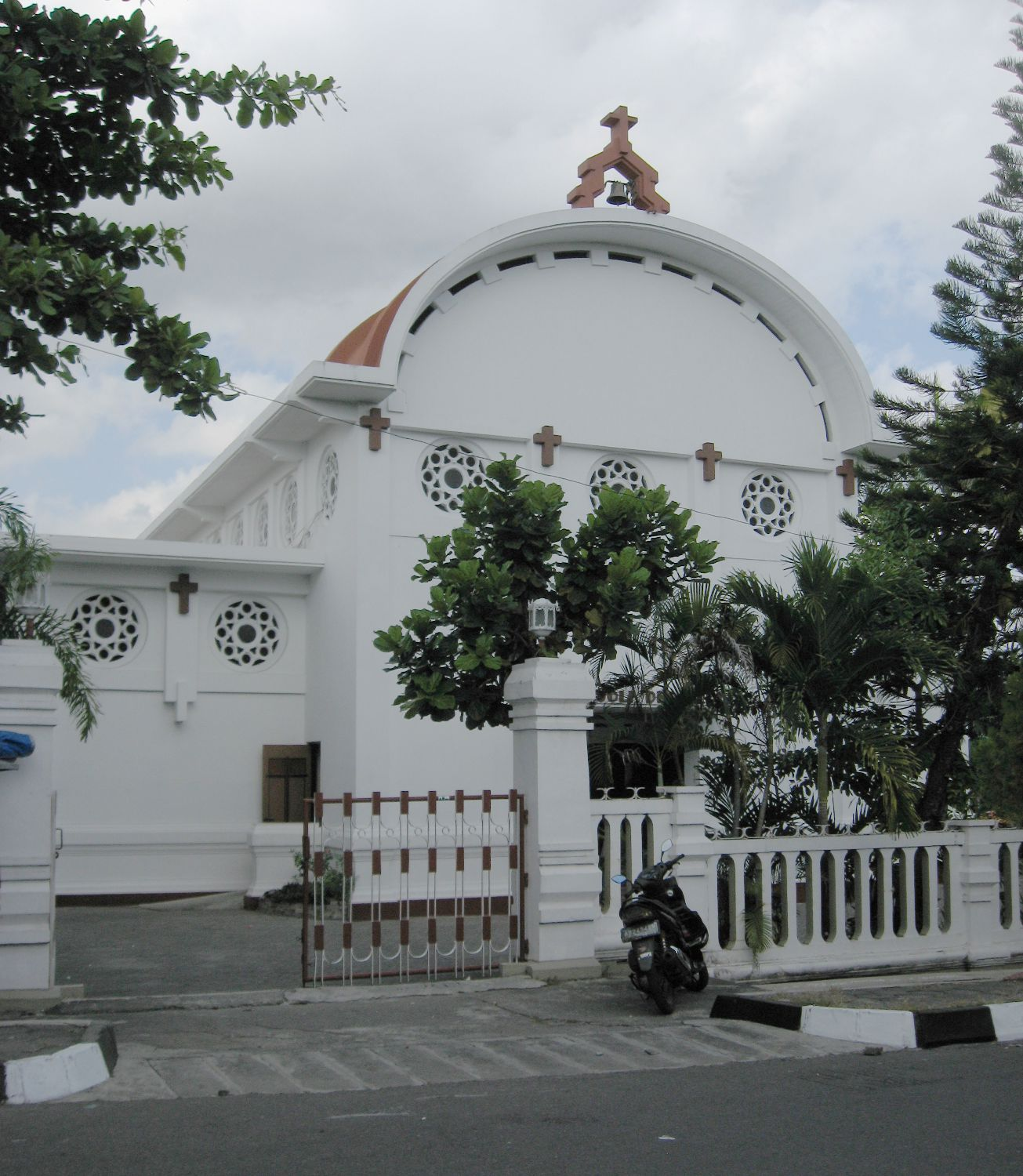
The St Yoseph Church in Bintaran, which served as Soegijapranata's seat during much of the Indonesian National Revolution

Military conflicts throughout the area and an ongoing Allied presence led to food shortages throughout the city, as well as constant blackouts and the establishment of a curfew. Civilian-run groups attempted to deal with the food shortages but were unable to cope. In an attempt to deal with these issues, Soegijapranata sent a local man, Dwidjosewojo, to the capital at Jakarta – renamed from Batavia during the Japanese occupation – to speak with the central government. Dwidjosewojo met with Prime Minister Sutan Sjahrir, who sent Wongsonegoro to help establish a civilian government, installing Moch. Ikhsan as mayor. The city's government was, however, still unable to handle the crisis, and the major figures in this government were later captured by the Dutch-run Netherlands Indies Civil Administration (NICA) and imprisoned; Soegijapranata, although he at times harboured Indonesian revolutionaries, was spared.

In January 1946 the Indonesian government moved from Jakarta – by then under Dutch control – to Yogyakarta. This was followed by a widespread exodus of civilians fleeing the advancing NICA soldiers. Soegijapranata at first stayed in Semarang, working to establish patrols and watches. He also corresponded with Willekens in Jakarta, although the elder bishop considered the revolution an internal security matter for the Dutch and not an issue for the Church. However, in early 1947 Soegijapranata moved to Yogyakarta, allowing easy communication with the political leadership. He established his seat at St Yoseph in Bintaran and counselled young Catholics to fight for their country, saying that they should only return "once they were dead". (Note: Original: "... baru boleh pulang kalau mati.") Soegijapranata was present during several battles that arose where he was preaching.

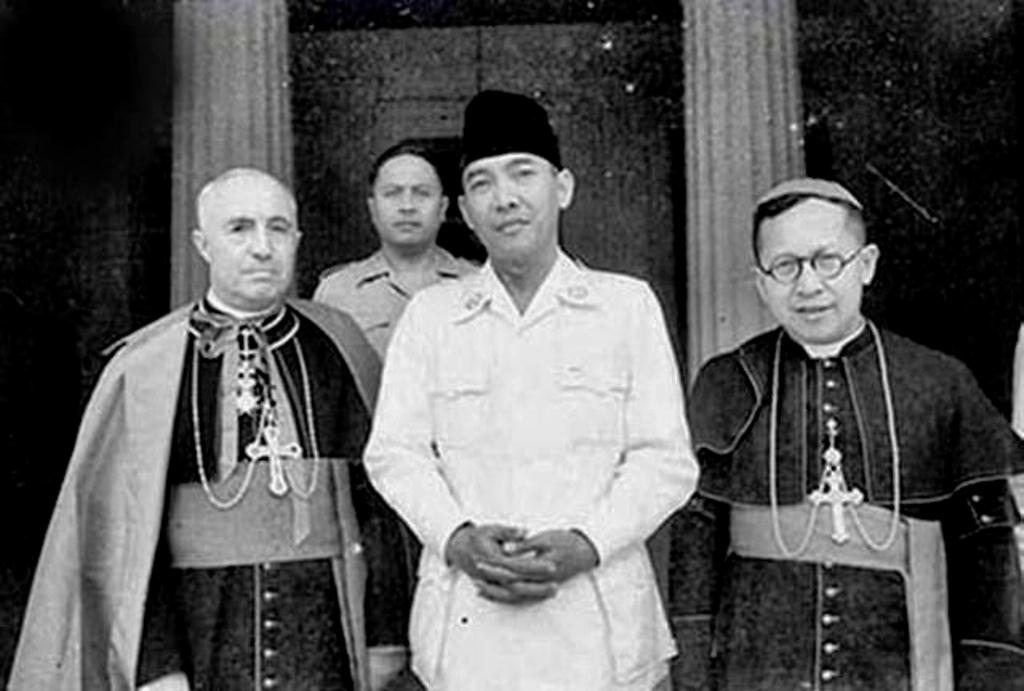
Soegijapranata and Georges de Jonghe d'Ardoye with President Sukarno, 1947

After the Linggadjati Agreement failed to solve conflicts between Indonesia and the Netherlands and the Dutch attacked republicans on 21 July 1947, Soegijapranata declared that Indonesia's Catholics would work with the Indonesians and called for an end to the war in a speech on Radio Republik Indonesia; van Klinken describes the address as "passionate" and considers it to have boosted the Catholic populace's morale. Soegijapranata wrote extensively to the Holy See. In response, the Church leadership sent Georges de Jonghe d'Ardoye to Indonesia as its delegate, initiating formal relations between the Vatican and Indonesia. D'Ardoye arrived in the new republic in December 1947 and met with President Sukarno; however, formal diplomatic relations were not opened until 1950. Soegijapranata later became a friend of the president.

After the Dutch captured the capital during Operation Kraai on 19 December 1948, Soegijapranata ordered that the Christmas festivities be kept simple to represent the Indonesian people's suffering. During the Dutch occupation Soegijapranata smuggled some of his writings out of the country; the works, later published in Commonweal with the help of George McTurnan Kahin, described Indonesians' daily lives under Dutch rule and called for international condemnation of the occupation. Soegijapranata further opined that the Dutch blockade on Indonesia, aside from strangling the new country's economy, increased the influence of its communist groups. After the Dutch retreated in the wake of the General Attack of 1 March 1949, Soegijapranata began working to ensure Catholic representation in the government. With I. J. Kasimo, he organised the All-Indonesia Catholic Congress (Kongres Umat Katolik Seluruh Indonesia). Held between 7 and 12 December, the congress resulted in the union of seven Catholic political parties into the Catholic Party. Soegijapranata continued his efforts to consolidate the Party after the revolution.

=== Post-revolution ===
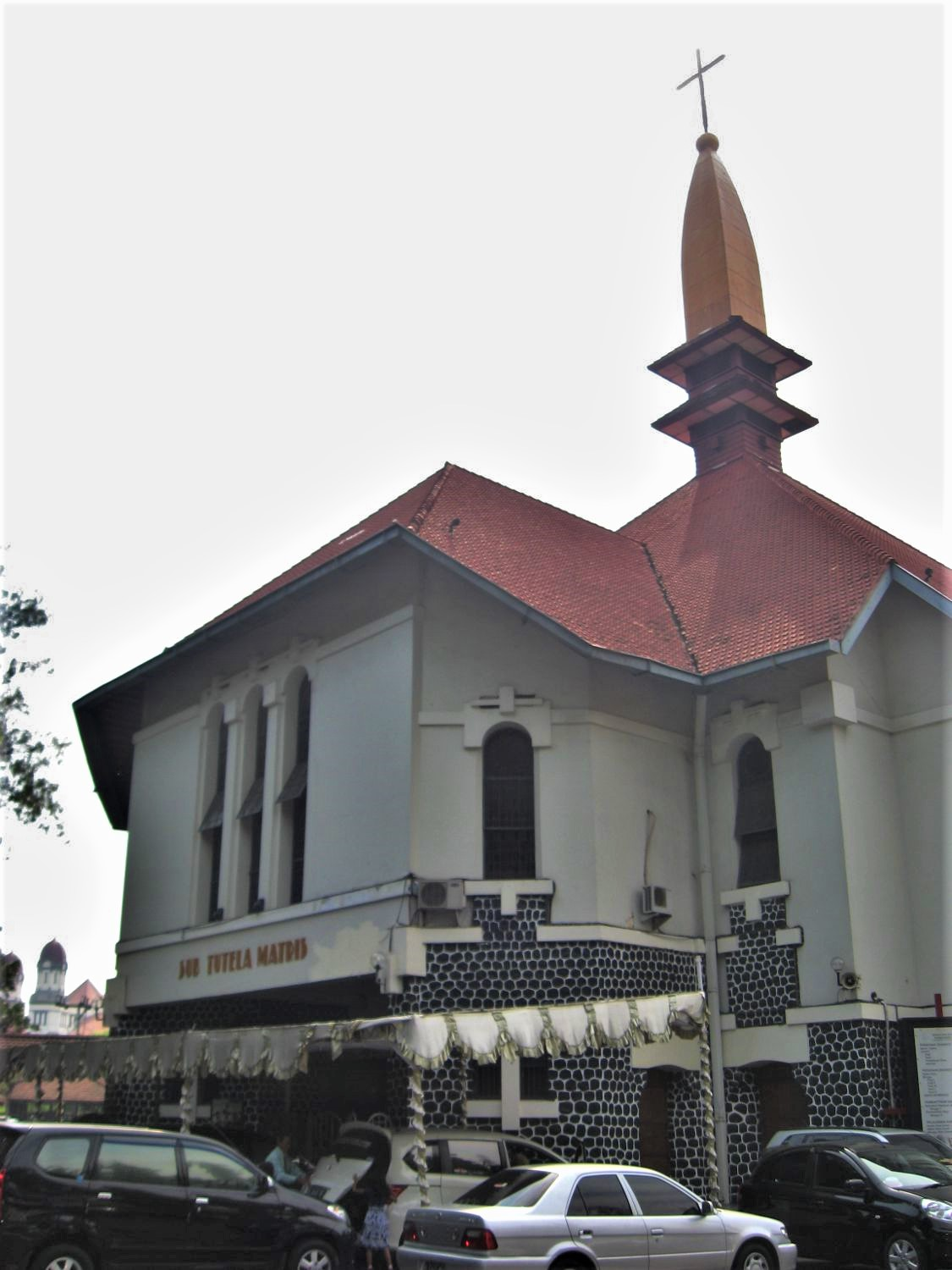
The Holy Rosary Cathedral at Randusari, Semarang, which served as Soegijapranata's seat for most of his time as a bishop

After the Dutch recognised Indonesia's independence on 27 December 1949, following a several month-long conference in the Hague, Soegijapranata returned to Semarang. The post-revolution period was marked by a drastic increase in enrolment at the nation's seminary; the 100th native Indonesian clergyman was ordained in 1956. The government, however, enacted several laws that limited the Church's ability to expand. In 1953 the Ministry for Religion decreed that no foreign missionaries would be allowed into the country, and a subsequent law prohibited those already in Indonesia from teaching. In response, Soegijapranata encouraged eligible clergy to apply for Indonesian citizenship, circumventing the new laws.

Aside from overseeing the new clergy, Soegijapranata continued to work towards Catholic education and prosperity, similar to his pre-war work. He emphasised that students must not only be good Catholics, but also good Indonesians. The Church began further development of its schools, ranging from elementary schools to universities. Soegijapranata also began reforming the Church in his apostolic vicariate, making it more Indonesian. He advocated the use of local languages and Indonesian during mass, allowing it throughout his diocese beginning in 1956. In addition, he pressed for the use of gamelan music to accompany services, and agreed to the use of wayang shows to teach the Bible to children.

As the Cold War heated up, tensions developed between the Church in Indonesia and the Indonesian Communist Party (PKI). Soegijapranata believed that the PKI was making progress with the poor through its promises of workers' rights in a communist-led union. To combat this, he worked with other Catholics to establish labour groups, open to both Catholics and non-Catholics. He hoped that these would empower workers and thus limit the PKI's influence. One such labour group was Buruh Pancasila, which was formed on 19 June 1954; through the organisation Soegijapranata helped promote the state philosophy of Pancasila (the five tenets). The following year the Bishops' Conference of Indonesia (MAWI, later KWI), recognising Soegijapranata's devotion to the poor, put him in charge of establishing social-support programmes throughout the archipelago. On 2 November 1955, he and several other bishops issued a decree denouncing communism, Marxism, and materialism, and asking the government to ensure fair and equitable treatment for all citizens. Relations between Indonesia and the Netherlands continued to be poor, specifically in regard to control of West Papua, historically under Dutch control but claimed by Indonesia. Soegijapranata firmly supported the Indonesian position; West Papua was annexed in 1963.

There was also friction within the Catholic groups, first over Sukarno's 1957 decree that he was president for life and establishment of a guided democracy policy. A faction, led by Soegijapranata, supported this decree, while Catholic Party leader I. J. Kasimo's faction was heavily against it. Sukarno, who had a good working relationship with Soegijapranata, asked the vicar to join the National Council, a request that Soegijapranata refused; he did, however, assign two delegates to the council, ensuring Catholic representation. (Note: The Catholic Party, in response to Sukarno's decree, had not sent any representatives (Gonggong 2012, pp. 117–118).) This, along with Soegijapranata's support of Sukarno's decree on 5 July 1959 calling for a return to the 1945 constitution, resulted in Bishop of Jakarta Adrianus Djajasepoetra's denunciation of Soegijapranata as a sycophant. However, Soegijapranata was strongly against Sukarno's idea of Nasakom, which based part of the nation's government on communism.

== Archbishop of Semarang and death ==
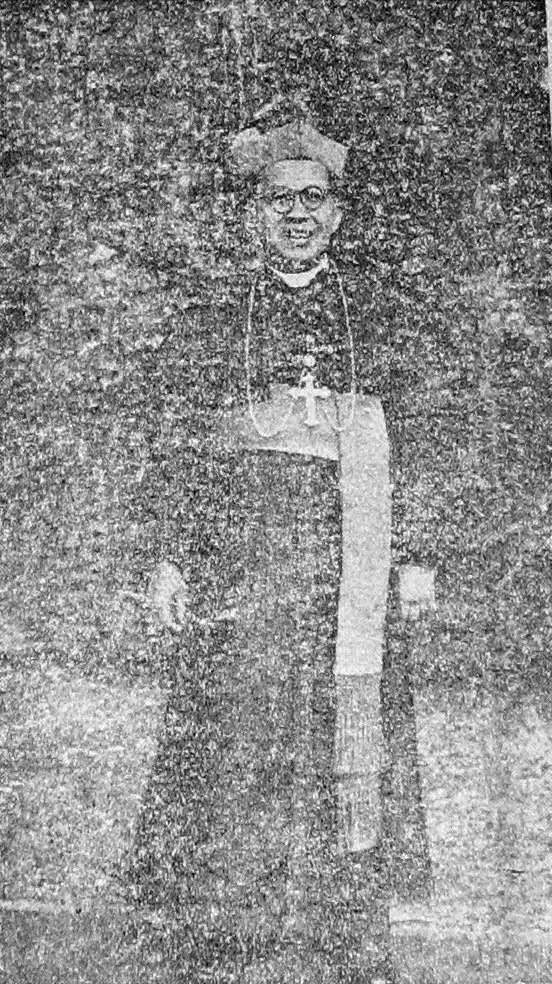
Soegijapranata in his later years

During the latter half of the 1950s, the KWI met several times to discuss the need for a self-determined Indonesian Catholic hierarchy. At these annual meetings, they touched on administrative and pastoral issues, including the translation of songs into Indonesian languages. In 1959 Cardinal Grégoire-Pierre Agagianian visited the country to see the Church's preparations. The KWI formally requested their own hierarchy in a May 1960 letter; this letter received a reply from Pope John XXIII dated 20 March 1961, which divided the archipelago into six ecclesiastical provinces: two in Java, one in Sumatra, one in Flores, one in Sulawesi and Maluku, and one in Borneo. Semarang became the seat of the province of Semarang, and Soegijapranata its archbishop. He was elevated on 3 January 1961.

When this happened, Soegijapranata was in Europe to attend the Second Vatican Council as part of the Central Preparatory Commission; he was one of eleven diocesan bishops and archbishops from Asia. He was able to attend the first session, where he voiced concerns about the declining quality of pastoral work and called for the modernisation of the Church. He then returned to Indonesia, but his health, poor since the late 1950s, quickly declined.

After a stay at Elisabeth Candi Hospital in Semarang in 1963, Soegijapranata was forbidden from undertaking active duties. Justinus Darmojuwono, a former internee of the Japanese army and vicar general of Semarang since 1 August 1962, served as acting bishop. On 30 May, Soegijapranata left Indonesia for Europe. Soegijapranata then went to Canisius Hospital in Nijmegen, where he underwent treatment from 29 June until 6 July; this was unsuccessful. He died on 22 July 1963, at a nunnery in Steyl, the Netherlands, having had a heart attack shortly before his death.

As Sukarno did not want Soegijapranata buried in the Netherlands, his body was flown to Indonesia after last rites were performed by Cardinal Bernardus Johannes Alfrink. Soegijapranata was declared a National Hero of Indonesia on 26 July 1963, through Presidential Decree No. 152/1963, while his body was still in transit. Soegijapranata's body arrived at Kemayoran Airport in Jakarta on 28 July and was brought to the Jakarta Cathedral for further rites, including a speech by Sukarno, presided by Bishop of Jakarta Adrianus Djajasepoetra. The following day Soegijapranata's body was flown to Semarang, accompanied by several Church and government luminaries. He was buried at Giri Tunggal Heroes' Cemetery in a military funeral on 30 July, after several further rites. Darmojuwono was appointed as the new archbishop in December 1963; he was consecrated on 6 April 1964 by Archbishop Ottavio De Liva.

== Legacy ==
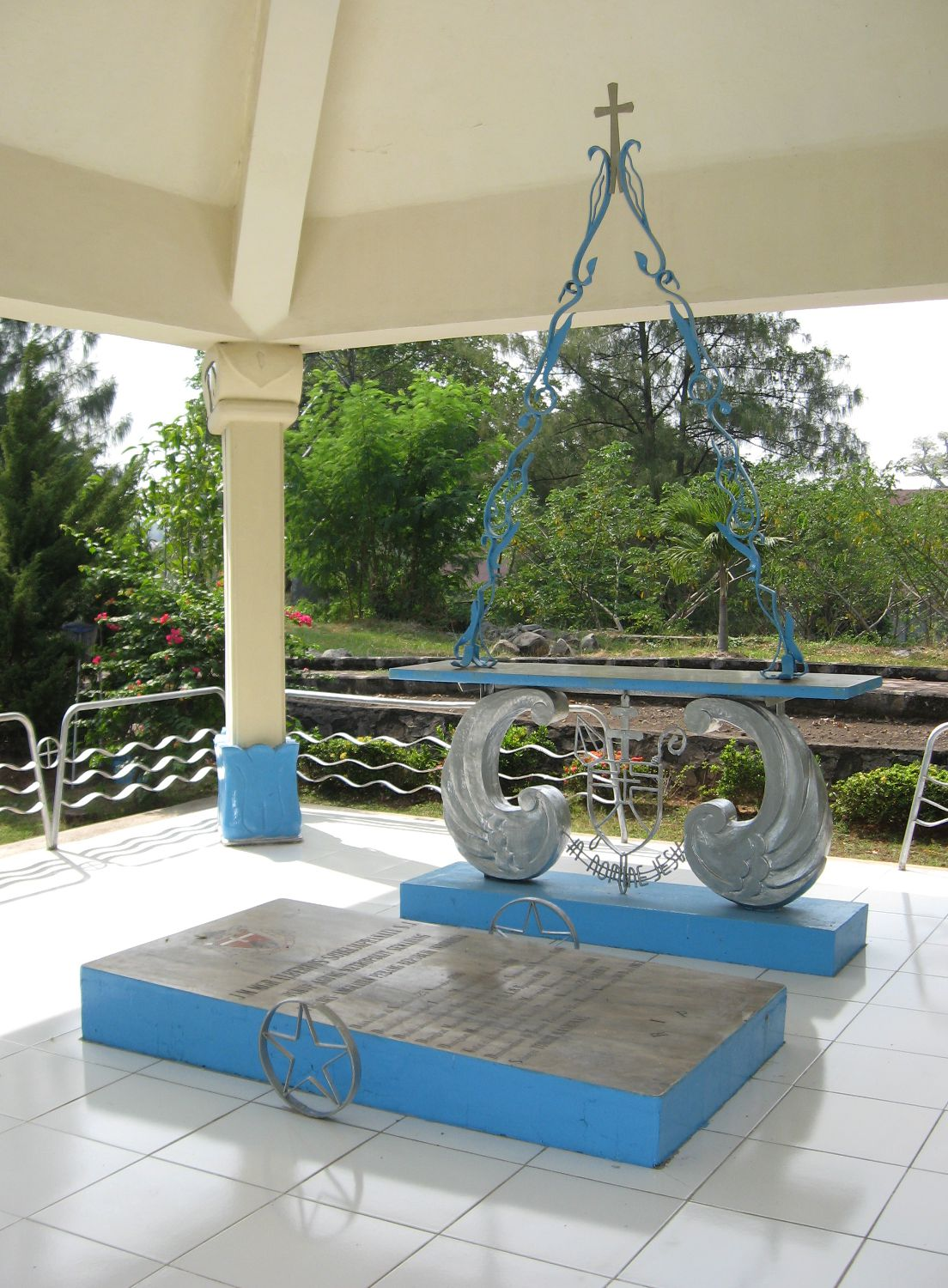
Soegijapranata's grave in Giri Tunggal

Soegijapranata is remembered with pride by Javanese Catholics, who praise his strength of will during the occupation and national revolution. The historian Anhar Gonggong described Soegijapranata as not just a bishop, but an Indonesian leader who "was tested as a good leader and deserved the hero status". The Indonesian historian Anton Haryono described Soegijapranata's ascension to bishophood as "monumental", considering that Soegijapranata had only been ordained nine years previously and was chosen ahead of non-Indonesian priests several years his senior. Henricia Moeryantini, a nun in the Order of Carolus Borromeus, writes that the Catholic Church became nationally influential under Soegijapranata, and that the archbishop cared too much for the people to take an outsider's approach. Van Klinken writes that Soegijapranata eventually became like a priyayi, or Javanese nobleman, within the church, as "committed to hierarchy and the status quo as to the God who created them". According to van Klinken, by coming to the nascent republic Soegijapranata had been willing to see "the coming Javanese paradise" at great personal risk.

Soegijapranata is the namesake of a large Catholic university in Semarang. Streets in several Indonesian cities are named after him, including in Semarang, Malang, and Medan. His grave in Giritunggal is often the site of pilgrimage for Indonesian Catholics, who hold graveside masses.

In June 2012 director Garin Nugroho released a biopic on Soegijapranata entitled Soegija. Starring Nirwan Dewanto in the titular role, the film followed Soegijapranata's activities during the 1940s, amidst a backdrop of the Japanese occupation and the war for Indonesian independence. The film, which had a Rp 12 billion (US$1.3 million) budget, sold over 100,000 tickets on its first day. Its launch was accompanied by a semi-fictional novelisation of Soegija's life, written by Catholic author Ayu Utami. Several non-fiction biographies of Soegija, by both Catholic and non-Catholic writers, were released concurrently.

In Indonesian popular culture, Soegijapranata is known for his motto "100% Catholic, 100% Indonesian" ("100% Katolik, 100% Indonesia"). The motto, which has been used to advertise several biographies and the film Soegija, is derived from Soegijapranata's opening speech at the 1954 All-Indonesia Catholic Congress in Semarang, as follows:

If we consider ourselves good Christians, then we should also become good patriots. As such, we should feel 100% patriotic because we are 100% Catholic. According to the Fourth Commandment, as written in the Catechism, we must love the Catholic Church and, it follows, we must love our country with all our hearts. (Note: Original: "Jika kita merasa sebagai orang Kristen yang baik, kita semestinya juga menjadi seorang patriot yang baik. Karenanya, kita merasa bahwa kita 100% patriotik sebab kita juga merasa 100% Katolik. Malahan, menurut perintah keempat dari Sepuluh Perintah Allah, sebagaimana tertulis dalam Katekismus, kita harus mengasihi Gereja Katolik, dan dengan demikian juga mengasihi negara, dengan segenap hati.")

— Soegijapranata, quoted in Subanar (2005, p. 82)

== See also ==
- Catholic Church in Indonesia

== Notes ==
Catholic Church titles
New diocese Elevated from apostolic vicariate	Archbishop of Semarang; 1961–1963	Succeeded by Justinus Darmojuwono
New diocese	Military Vicar of Indonesia; 1949–1963	Succeeded by Justinus Darmojuwono
New diocese	Apostolic Vicar of Semarang; 1940–1961	Elevated to archdiocese
