= Fransiskus Xaverius Sukendar Wignyosumarta =

Indonesian priest

The Very Reverend Fransiskus Xaverius Sukendar Wignyosumarta Pr.
- Church: Saint Virgin Mary of Holy Rosary Cathedral Church
- Archdiocese: Archdiocese of Semarang
- Province: Central Java
- Metropolis: Semarang
- In office: Vicar General of Archdiocese of Semarang
- Predecessor: Mgr. Pius Riana Prapdi
- Previous post: Episcopal Vicar of Semarang

Orders
- Ordination: 12 August 1992 by Julius Cardinal Darmaatmadja, SJ

Personal details
- Born: Sukendar Wignyosumarta; 8 August 1964
- Denomination: Roman Catholic
- Residence: Archdiocese of Semarang
- Parents: Antonius Kayat Wignyosumarta and Anastasia Kasinah

Fransiskus Xaverius Sukendar Wignyosumarta (born 8 August 1964) was the Vicar General of the Archdiocese of Semarang. Before that, he was an Episcopal Vicar of Semarang and a Parish Priest of Semarang Cathedral.

== Early career ==
Sukendar was baptisized with the name Fransiskus Xaverius in September 1964 in Banteng Church, Yogyakarta. His mother died in 1981 and his father died in 1999.

He was ordained to the priesthood in 1992 by the incumbent Archbishop of Semarang, Julius Darmaatmadja. After that, he was ordered to serve at St. St. Mary of the Assumption Church, Klaten as a curate until 1995. After that, he served at Minor Seminary of Mertoyudan, Magelang until 2003. In 2003, Sukendar was appointed to serve at Sragen, staying until 2008.

== Archdiocese of Semarang ==
Sukendar was appointed Episcopal Vicar of Semarang and as a parish priest of Semarang Cathedral on August 15, 2008, replacing Julius Sukardi. Semarang Cathedral was located near Tugu Muda Monument, in what became the city's downtown area. His leadership at Semarang Cathedral ended on August 26, 2012.

On August 6, 2012, Sukendar was appointed Vicar General of Archdiocese of Semarang, taking the position on August 26, 2012.
