= Soegijapranata Catholic University =

Catholic university in Indonesia

- Universitas Katolik Soegijapranata
- Motto: Talenta pro patria et humanitate
- Motto in English: The best talent is dedicated to the nation-state and humanity
- Established: 5 August 1982
- Rector: Dr. Ferdinandus Hindiarto, S.Psi., M.Si.
- Location: Jl. Pawiyatan Luhur IV/1 Bendan Duwur, Semarang, Central Java, Indonesia; 7.024381°S 110.403735°E
- Colors: Purple
- Website: www.unika.ac.id
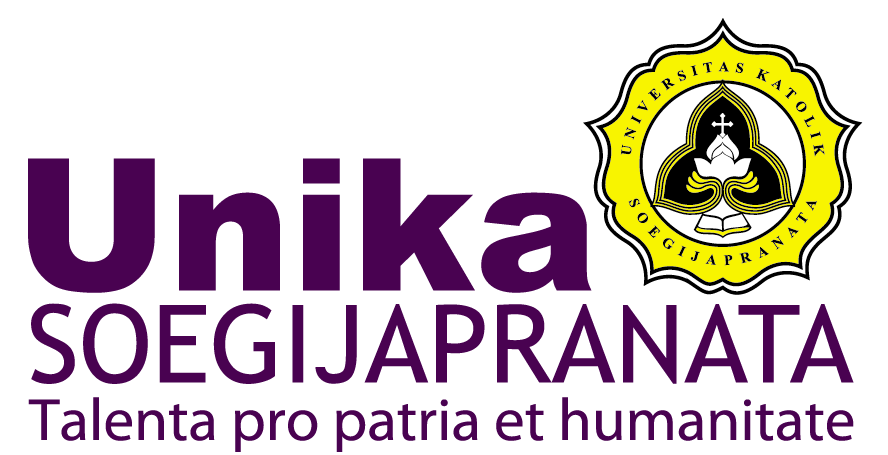

- Location in Semarang

Soegijapranata Catholic University (Indonesian: Universitas Katolik Soegijapranata), abbreviated as SCU, is an Indonesian Catholic institution with an institutional accreditation of A. It is located in the city of Semarang, Central Java and under the auspices of the Sandjojo Foundation which is affiliated with Archdiocese of Semarang. The university is a continuation of the Indonesian Catholic University of Atmajaya Semarang Branch, which was born in 1964 and later changed its name into the Semarang Catholic Institute of Technology (I.T.K.S.) in 1973. On August 5, 1982, with the Decree of the Minister of Education and Culture of the Republic of Indonesia dated September 24, 1983 Number 0400/0/1983, I.T.K.S. changed its name into Soegijapranata Catholic University.

Soegijapanata Catholic University is one of the best private universities in Indonesia that upholds the motto: "Talent Pro Patria et Humanitate" (the best talent is dedicated to the nation-state and humanity). The university has an extensive overseas and domestic cooperation network.

== History ==
At its inception, Soegijapranata Catholic University (SCU), located on Jl. Pandanaran 100, Semarang consists of three faculties namely Faculty of Engineering, Faculty of Law, and Faculty of Economics. In line with the development of the university, since mid-1990s all SCU's activities have been centered on the Bendan Dhuwur Campus and until now the Bendhan Dhuwur Campus has become the center of the university's academic activities.

The name "Soegijapranata" is adapted from the name Mgr. Alb. Soegijapranata, SJ, a priest and the first native Archbishop who became Indonesia's national hero and figure. Soegijapranata was born in Surakarta, November 25, 1896. He entered the novices of the Society of Jesus in Mariendaal, Grave, the Netherlands on September 27, 1920. He was ordained as a pcapriest on August 15, 1931, and as an archbishop of Semarang on September 20, 1940. His struggle and attention in the world of education is the legacy of his lecturer, Father Frans van Lith, SJ. One of his efforts to improve education was to help increase the quality of two oldest Catholic universities, Parahyangan Catholic University, Bandung, and Sanata Dharma University, Yogyakarta, that were of equal status with the state universities. Taking the life story of Mgr. Albertus Soegijapranata, a movie entitled “Soegija” was appointed to the big screen in 2012. This movie was directed by Garin Nugroho and received a very good response where more than 500,000 spectators watched this movie in theaters throughout Indonesia.

Through the name "Soegijapranata", Soegijapranata Catholic University wishes to continue the spirit, the struggles and the ideals of Mgr. Alb. Soegijapranata, SJ.

== International cooperation ==
As one of the leading universities in Indonesia, international cooperation is also woven by the Soegijapranata Catholic University. Collaborations include: memoranda of understanding, student and faculty exchanges, scholarships, value sharing, and participation in international conferences. In addition, SCU involvement in several network of international universities e.g. ASEACCU (Association of South East and East Asia Catholic Colleges and Universities) and ACUCA (Association of Christian Universities and Colleges in Asia), further expands the university's affiliations so that programs such as student/staff exchange and international conferences become a mandatory agenda in each semester.

1. Netherlands: Vrije University of Amsterdam, Radboud University, Wageningen University
2. United States: Youngstown State University Ohio, Bowling Green State University Ohio
3. Germany: Leibniz University Hannover
4. Italy: Universita Della Callabria
5. Taiwan: Tunghai University, Providence University, Fu Jen Catholic University, Wenzao Ursuline University of Languages, Chang Jung Christian University, Soochow University
6. South Korea: Namseoul University, Hanyang University, Catholic University of Korea, Soongsil University, Ewha Womans University, Handong Global University
7. Japan: Sophia University, International Christian University
8. Vietnam: FPT University
9. Singapore: National University of Singapore
10. Malaysia: Cyberjaya University College of Medical Sciences
11. China: Guangxi Normal University
12. Thailand: Assumption University of Bangkok, Mahidol University
13. Philippines: De La Salle University-Dasmarinas, San Beda College, University of San Carlos, Ateneo de Davao University, Miriam College, Ateneo de Manila University
14. East Timor: Dili Institute of Technology

== Student activity units ==
The Soegijapranata Catholic University has various kinds of Student Activity Units (UKM) which serve as a place for self-actualization of its students. By following UKM, students will not only get quality soft skills, but also organizational skills and self-control that are very useful for the careers of students in the future. Below are list of Student Activity Units owned by Soegijapranata Catholic University, Semarang.

1. Sports: Basketball, Football, Tennis, Badminton, Futsal
2. Art: Choir (Gratia Choir and Gratia Voice), Dance
3. Entrepreneurship: Soegijapranata Student Cooperative (KOPMA) with an integrated Student Business Center
4. Hobbies: Bridge, Soegijapranata English Debate Club
5. Pastoral and Counseling Services: Campus Ministry and Peer Educator
6. Martial Arts: Karate, Capoiera
7. Soegijapranata Echo Life (SEL): is a student activity unit that likes to recycle used goods
8. Student Press Institute (Paraga),
9. Voluntary Corps (KSR),
10. Soepra Radio and Television
11. Racana Soegijapranata (Scouts)

== Notable alumni ==
1. Hendrar Prihadi (Mayor of Semarang 2013-2015 and 2015–2020)
2. Dea Goesti Riskita Koswara (Runner-up 3 and Miss Grand International Indonesia)
3. Mandy Adriani Tutuarima (1st Runner-up Putri Indonesia 2000)

== Rector ==
No	Name	Term of office
1	Dr. A. Suroyo	1982–1986
2	Dr. Y. Chr. Purwawidyana, PR.	1986–1989
3	Dr. M. Sastrapratedja, SJ.	1989–1993
4	Dr. Ir. P. Wiryono Priyotamtomo, MSc., SJ.	1993–1996
5	Dr. Al. Purwo Hadiwardaya, MSF.	1996–2000
6	Dr. Martinus T. Handoko, FIC.	2000–2004
7	Prof. Dr. M. Sastrapratedja, SJ.	2004–2005
8	Dr. Y. Bagus Wismanto, Msi.	2005–2009
9	Prof. Dr. Ir. Y. Budi Widianarko, M.Sc.	2009–2017
10	Prof. Dr. F. Ridwan Sanjaya, SE., S.Kom., MS.IEC	2017–2021
11	Dr. Ferdinandus Hindiarto, SPsi., MSi	2021–2025
