= Giri Tunggal Heroes' Cemetery =

Military cemetery in Semarang, Indonesia

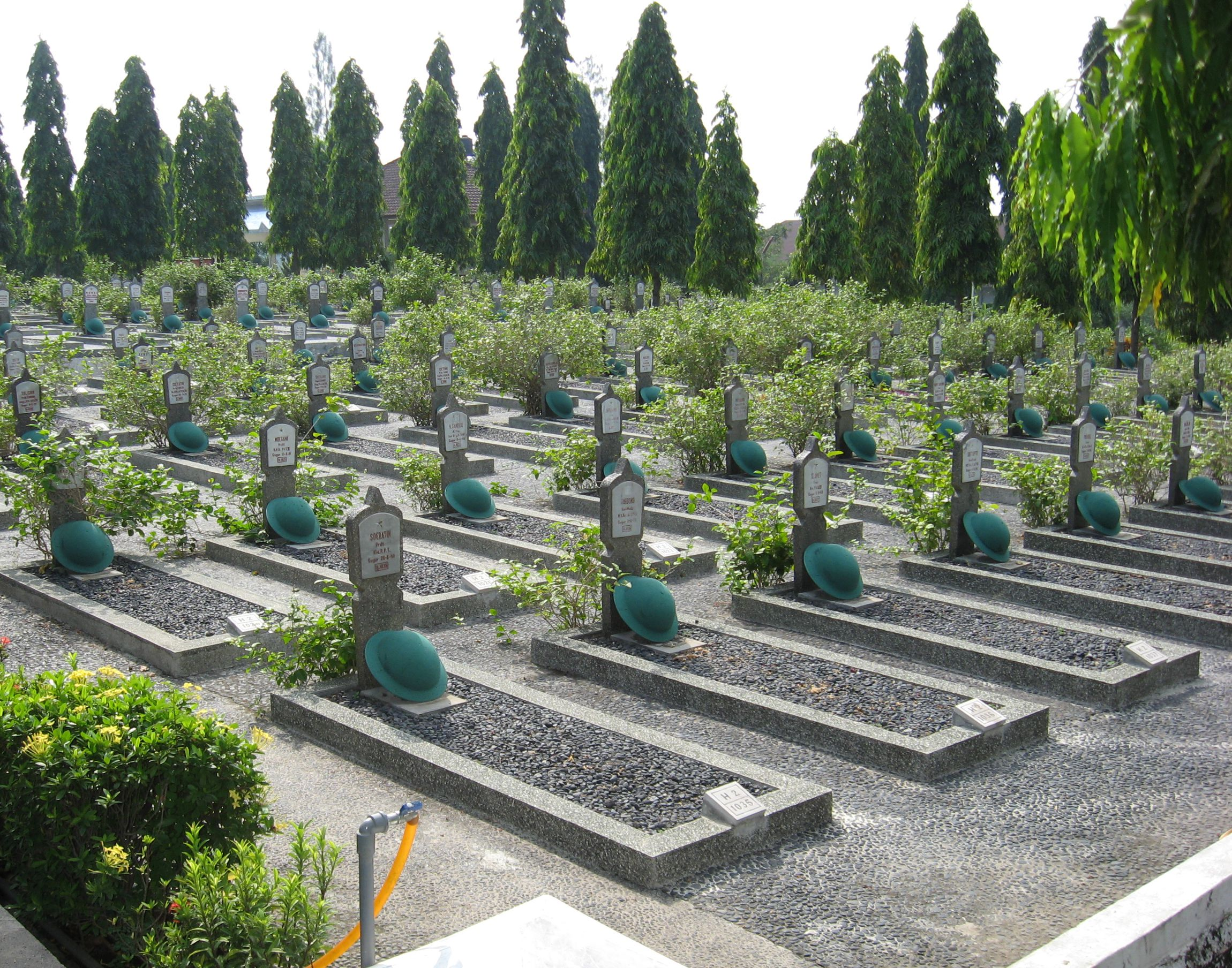
- Graves in the cemetery
- Interactive map of Giri Tunggal Heroes' Cemetery

Details
- Established: 10 November 1955
- Location: Pahlawan Street, Semarang
- Country: Indonesia
- Coordinates: 6°59′49.9″S 110°25′14.4″E
- Owned by: Indonesian National Government
- Size: 3.64 hectares (9.0 acres)
- No. of graves: 1,843 (2011)

Giri Tunggal Heroes' Cemetery (also spelled Giritunggal Heroes' Cemetery; Indonesian: Taman Makam Pahlawan Giri Tunggal) is a cemetery in Semarang, Central Java. It contains the graves of military personnel and other persons deemed heroes by the Indonesian government, including the National Hero Albertus Soegijapranata. As of 2011 it has 1,843 interments.

== Description ==
Giri Tunggal sits on 3.64 hectares (9.0 acres) of land. The complex includes graves, a monument, a wall naming the individual interments, and gardens.

== History ==
Interments in what is now Giri Tunggal began in 1945. The cemetery was formalised with the name Giri Tunggal Heroes' Cemetery on 10 November 1955, Heroes' Day in Indonesia. The cemetery included attendees from various backgrounds, including students, soldiers, and families of the interred. It was opened at 8 a.m. local time (UTC+7) with the reading of President Sukarno's decree, and closed with a rendition of Ismail Marzuki's "Gugur Bunga".

After his death, the Archbishop of Semarang and National Hero of Indonesia Albertus Soegijapranata was flown from Steyl in the Netherlands and buried in a military ceremony at Giri Tunggal on 30 July 1963. His grave continues to be a pilgrimage destination, and Indonesian Catholics hold mass by his grave on special occasions. By 1979 the cemetery was watched by only two people, one on a morning shift and one on a night shift.

The former governor of Central Java, HM Ismail, was buried in Giri Tunggal following his death on 23 February 2008. Between 2009 and 2011 the cemetery was fenced at a cost of Rp 2.7 billion. After the renovations, Social Minister Salim Segaf Al-Jufri described the cemetery as the second-best heroes' cemetery in the country, after Kalibata Heroes' Cemetery in Jakarta. At the time it held 1,843 interments. Of these, according to the Semarang-based daily Suara Merdeka only two, Kho Siang Bo and Lie Eng Hok, have explicitly Chinese names; Kho may have been a fighter during the Five Day Struggle in October 1945, while Lie was an early figure in the Indonesian Communist Party who was detained in Boven-Digoel for five years.

== See also ==
- Kalibata Heroes' Cemetery
- Kusumanegara Heroes' Cemetery
