= Ottavio De Liva =

Italian prelate

Ottavio De Liva (10 June 1911 – 23 August 1965) was an Italian prelate of the Catholic Church who worked in the diplomatic service of the Holy See. Early in his career, in 1950, he was expelled from Czechoslovakia as part of the young Communist government's campaign to exercise control over the Church.

== Biography ==
Ottavio De Liva was born on 10 June 1911 in the town of Sevegliano, Bagnaria Arsa, Province of Udine, Italy, the sixth of seven children. He was ordained a priest of the Diocese of Udine on 8 July 1934.

To prepare for a diplomatic career he entered the Pontifical Ecclesiastical Academy in 1939.

In 1950, during a period of intense conflict between the Church and the government of Czechoslovakia, De Liva, though only the secretary, was the last Vatican diplomat remaining in the nunciature. He therefore acted on behalf of the nunciature there for eight months as the government delayed approving a visa to allow the newly appointed chargé d’affaires to enter the country. The government launched a campaign of press denunciations against him in late February. On 16 March, the government ordered him to leave the country within three days; it accused him of "subversive, anti-state activity", staging phony miracles, interfering in internal affairs, and "misusing his official position". He had visited Prague Archbishop Josef Beran, under house arrest, repeatedly over several months and made another visit immediately upon receiving the order to quit the country. At the time, the New York Times described De Liva as "a 39-year-old rotund, mild-mannered Italian from Udine". In a demonstration of support, much of the diplomatic corps in Prague saw him off at the airport.

From 1950 to 1954 he worked in the Nunciature to Germany. He was the Permanent Delegate of the Holy See to the International Atomic Energy Agency in Vienna from 1960 to 1962.

On 18 April 1962, Pope John XXIII appointed him Apostolic Internuncio to Indonesia and titular archbishop of Heliopolis in Phoenicia. He received his episcopal consecration from Cardinal Franz König on 27 May 1962. In Indonesia he at times negotiated directly with President Sukarno.

De Liva died in a hospital in Udine on 23 August 1965 at the age of 54.
