= Bintaran =

Coordinates: 7.8050°S 110.3767°E

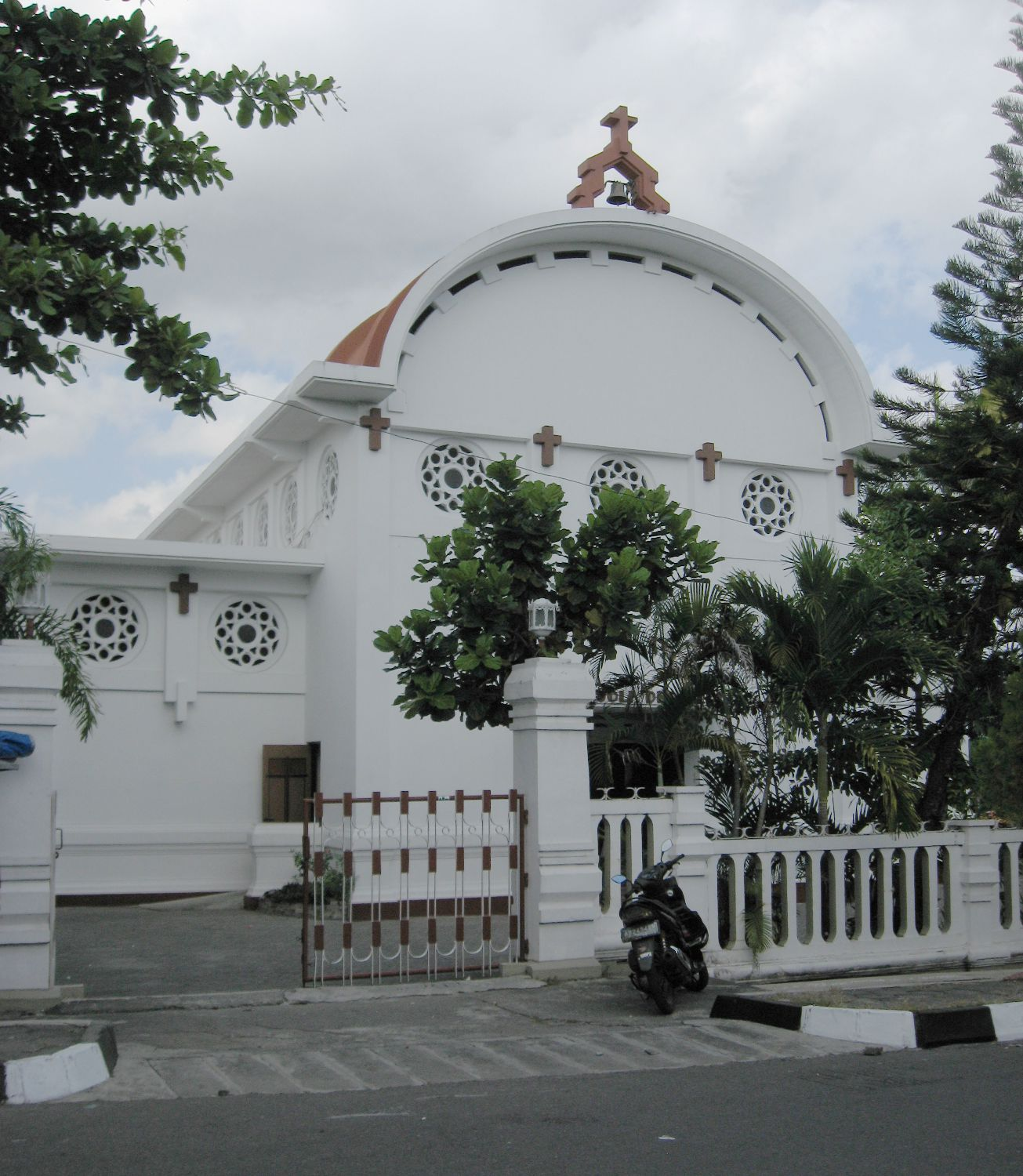
St. Joseph's Church of Bintaran settlement

Bintaran (Javanese: ꦧꦶꦤ꧀ꦠꦫꦤ꧀) is a village in Wirogunan, Mergangsan, Yogyakarta, Indonesia. The area is known for its Dutch-Javanese architecture. It was formerly a Catholic settlement.

== History ==
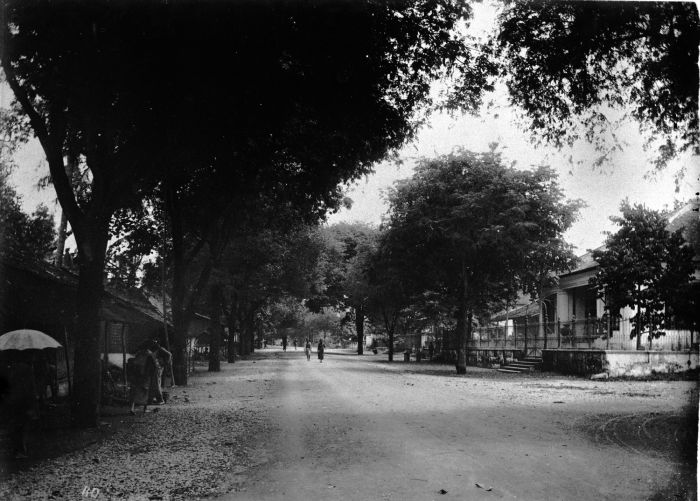
Bintaran District in 1890

Before evolving into an Indisch settlement, Bintaran was known as the location of Ndalem Mandara Giri, a palace of Prince Haryo Bintoro, one of the descendant of Ngayogyakarta Hadiningrat. The name Bintaran is derived from the name of the prince. During the 1930s, the location grows as an Indisch settlement when a church and civic buildings were constructed. At that time, Bintaran was an alternative settlement region for the Dutch people in Yogyakarta which evolved after Loji Kecil area was not adequate anymore. Dutch people who resided in Bintaran were usually officers or sugar factory workers.

== Sights ==
Buildings in Bintaran are fusion of Javanese-Dutch style with thick white walls, tall main door and tall windows. The area has a distinct style which makes it different with buildings in Loji Kecil or Kota Baru: the yard are more spacious while the porch smaller with many pillars. The front doors are usually louvered and the inner doors are often completed with glass.

One of the oldest building is Ndalem Mandara Giri, the former palace of the Prince. The building shows fusion between Dutch and Javanese architecture in the use of Javanese pendopo element, specially constructed with building material from Demak in 1908; and a Dutch-styled interior with a typical high ceiling and tall windows. The house functioned as exhibition room for kris.

Sudirman Museum or officially Museum Sasmitaloka Panglima Besar (Pangsar) Jenderal Sudirman is a museum building on the left side of Bintaran Road. The building was completed in 1890 and was used as residence for financial officer of Pura Paku Alaman VII named Wijnschenk. During the course of history, this building was also used as the residence of General Sudirman.

The Biology Museum of Bintaran is located at Jalan Sultan Agung. It was utilized as the residence of Pakualaman military supervisor. The Fire Fighters Quarter of Bintaran was formerly the residence of Henry Paul Sagers. Wirogunan prison is a Dutch prison which is still used today.

=== St. Joseph Church of Bintaran ===
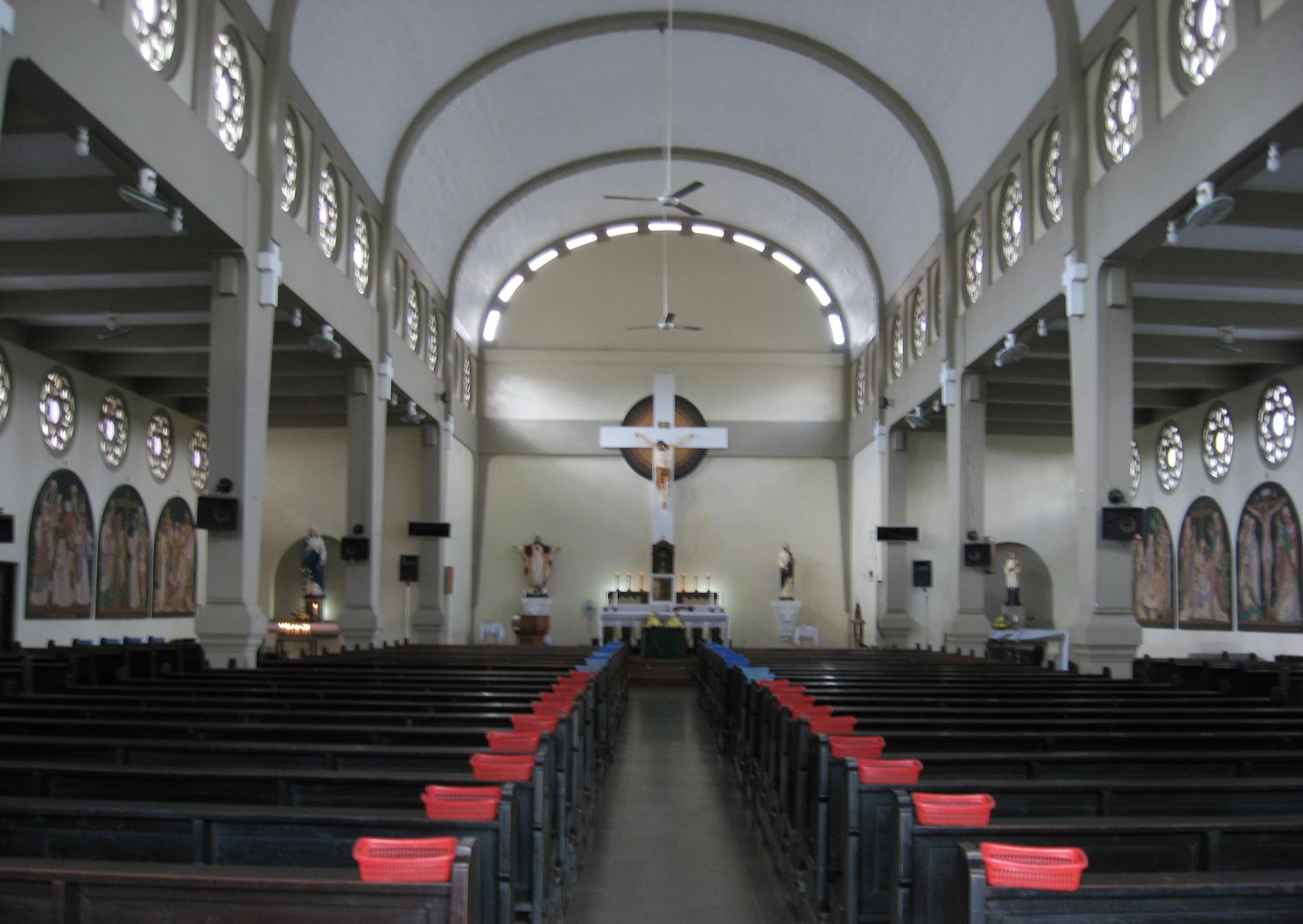
Interior of St. Joseph Church of Bintaran

The church of Bintaran was founded by H. van Driessche to accommodate the increasing number of Catholics in Yogyakarta as Kidul Loji Church could not accommodate them anymore. It was designed by J.H. van Oten BNA and the construction was executed by Hollandsche Beton Maatschappij in 1931 on the Kampementstraat (now Bintaran Kidul). The church was designed by Father H. Van Driessche and Mr. Dawoed specifically for the Javanese people, as Javanese people at that time were not used to attend religious ritual in a Western-style building (e.g. sitting on bench, long narrow room) because of the fabric they used. St. Joseph Church of Bintaran is 36 meters by 20 meters long, and the height is 13 meters. The church is white following the color of the surrounding buildings. The mass bench is only located at the back side, where the Europeans and Javanese upper class usually sat. The front part of this are mattress made of bamboo for the Javanese mass service to sit upon. Sun light enters the room through 72 double roosters instead of windows.

== See also ==
- List of churches in Indonesia
