= Holy Rosary Cathedral, Semarang =

Catholic church in Indonesia

Holy Rosary Cathedral
- Cathedral of the Virgin Mary, Queen of the Holy Rosary
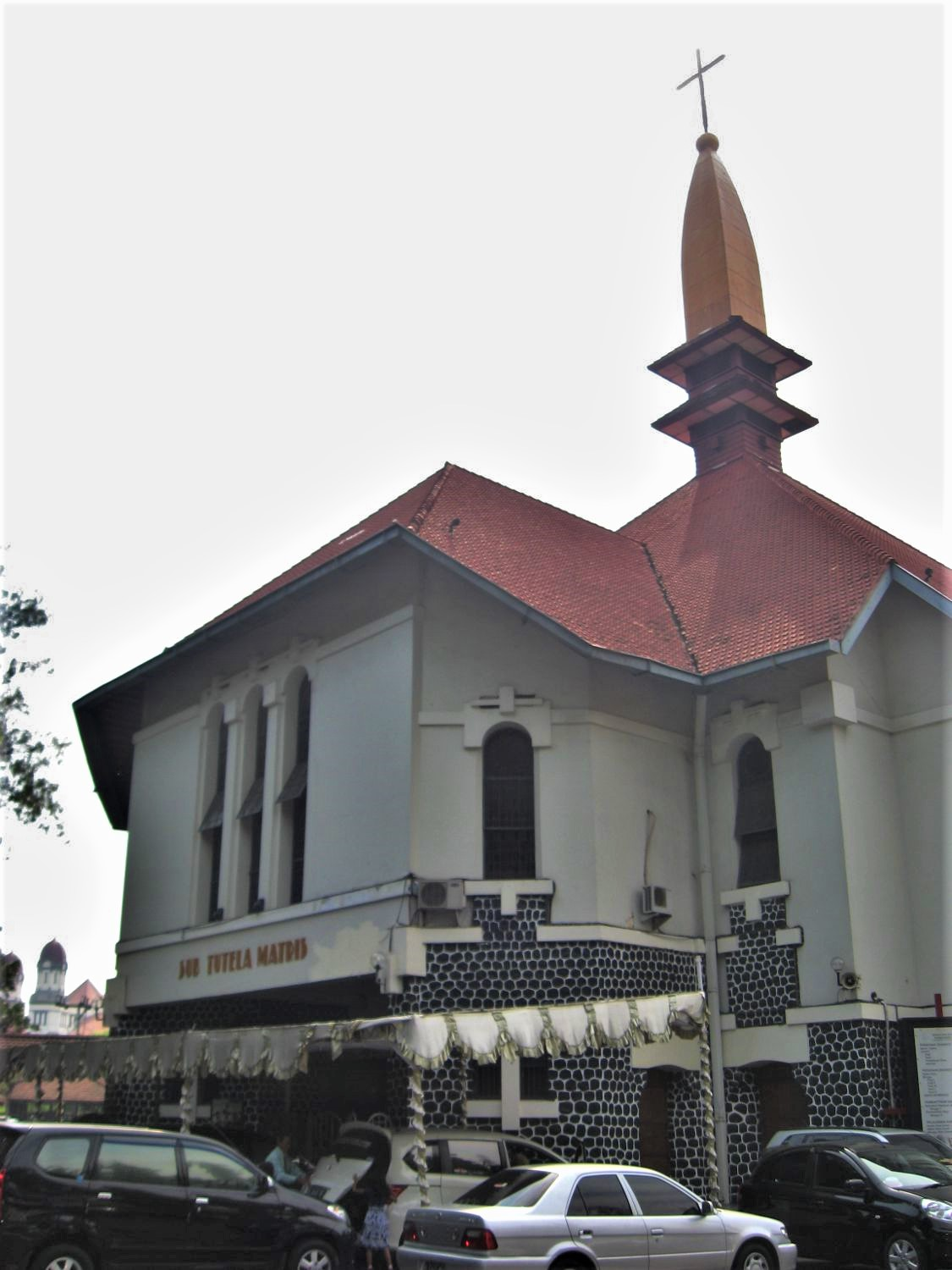
- Exterior, from the side

- Location in Semarang
- 6°59′7″S 110°24′35″E
- Location: Semarang
- Country: Indonesia
- Denomination: Roman Catholic

History
- Status: Cathedral
- Dedication: Our Lady of the Rosary

Architecture
- Functional status: Active
- Completed: 1927

Administration
- Archdiocese: Semarang
- Deanery: Semarang
- Parish: Randusari

Clergy
- Archbishop: Robertus Rubiyatmoko
- Rector: RD. Yosaphat Dani Puspantoro

The Cathedral of the Virgin Mary, Queen of the Holy Rosary (Indonesian: Gereja Katedral Perawan Maria Ratu Rosario Suci), also known as the Holy Rosary Cathedral or Randusari Cathedral, is a Roman Catholic cathedral and the seat of the Archdiocese of Semarang. Finished in 1927 at Randusari, Semarang, Indonesia, it became a parish church in 1930 and a cathedral in 1940, when Albertus Soegijapranata was made the first archbishop of Semarang.

== Description ==
The cathedral is located near Tugu Muda, in Randusari, Semarang. The Tugu Muda area, a Cultural Property of Indonesia, also includes Lawang Sewu, Mandala Bhakti Museum, and Bulu Market.

The cathedral complex includes the cathedral proper, a meeting hall, and a school. In 2012, an official residence and office for the bishop was formalised. It contains a chapel, archive, secretariat, a garden, and general purpose room, as well as six rooms of residential space. It is the seat of the Archdiocese of Semarang.

The cathedral is built on a stone foundation, with a large, column-free congregation hall within. The roofs and arches have parapets, and the doors on the rectangular building face north, west, and south; the facade is to the west.

== History ==
The land on which the cathedral now stands belonged to the city's health department but was purchased by the Catholic Church in 1926 to establish a new church to cater to the increasing number of Catholics in the area. The existing churches at Gedangan and Candi were thought too distant. The cathedral was formally opened in 1927.

In 1930 the cathedral was made a parish church, under J. Hoebrecht. In 1935 the old building was torn down, and replaced by a design from J. Th. van Oyen; the contractor, Kleiverde, built it. The church was further expanded in 1937, and the lands were fenced off.

In 1940, when the Apostolic Vicariate of Batavia was split in two, with Albertus Soegijapranata as the apostolic vicar. Randusari was established as the apostolic vicariate's cathedral. In early 1942, when the Japanese Empire occupied the Dutch East Indies, the Japanese forces in Semarang ordered Soegijapranata, the vicar, to surrender the church. He refused to allow this, saying that the Japanese forces could have his cathedral only if they removed his head first and directed them towards nearby cinemas instead. The Japanese allowed Soegijapranata to keep both the cathedral and his head.

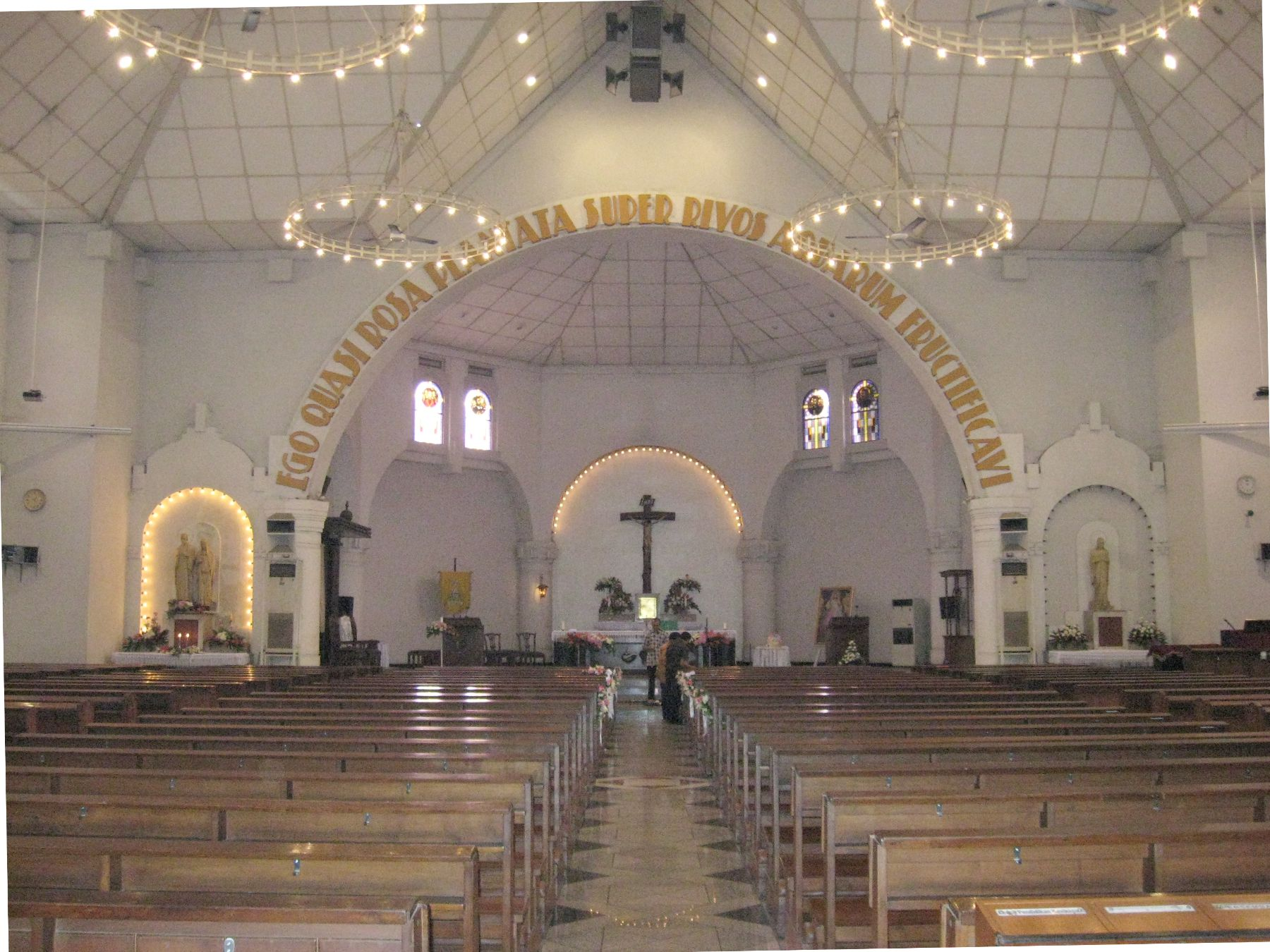
Interior

Indonesia proclaimed its independence in August 1945, and the cathedral continued to be used by Soegijapranata until 18 January 1947. The unrest caused by the Indonesian National Revolution and Soegijapranata's desire to support the new Indonesian republic led him to move the vicariate's seat to St Yoseph Church in Bintaran. After the Dutch recognised Indonesia's independence in 1949, Soegijapranata returned to Semarang and kept his seat there until his death. Justinus Darmojuwono, who had been parish priest cum vicar general at the cathedral since 1962, was consecrated as bishop following Soegijapranata's death.

In June 2012, an official residence and office for the bishop was built, funded by the diocese's Catholics. The residence is called "Wisma Uskup" in Indonesian.

== See also ==
- List of church buildings in Indonesia
