= Muntilan =

Coordinates: 7.58°S 110.298°E

- District
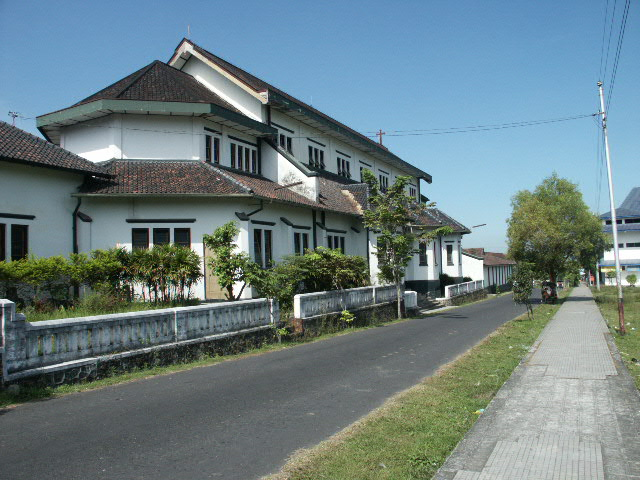
- A church in Muntilan
- Interactive map of Muntilan
- Country: Indonesia
- Province: Central Java
- Regency: Magelang Regency

Area
  - Total: 30.36 km^{2} (11.72 sq mi)

Population (mid 2024 estimate)
  - Total: 81,555
  - Density: 2,686/km^{2} (6,957/sq mi)
- Website: kecamatanmuntilan.magelangkab.go.id

Muntilan is an administrative district (kecamatan) in the Magelang Regency, Central Java. Muntilan is located about 15 km south of Magelang, 10 km from Mungkid, 25 km from Yogyakarta, and 90 km from the main town of Semarang located on the northern coast of Java. The town of Muntilan is on the old railway route between Kebon Polo station in Magelang and the main Tugu station in Yogyakarta. Tourists on their way to the famous Buddhist temple Borobudur usually pass through Muntilan.

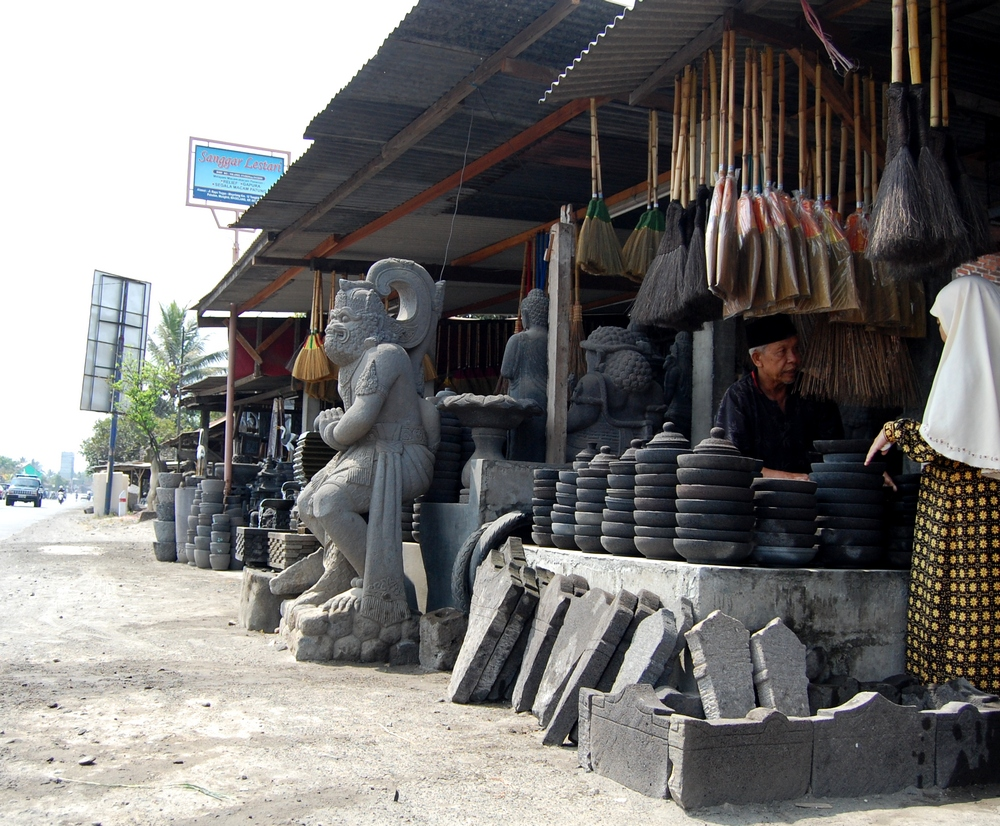
A typical Muntilan stone craft outlet

Muntilan township is one of the main market centers on the western slopes of Mount Merapi, a major volcano in central Java within the administrative ambit of the regional government in Magelang. The locality of this district is densely populated; in mid-2024 there was a population of 81,555 people living in an area of 30.36 km^{2}, indicating a population density of 2,686 per km^{2}.

== History ==
The adjacent countryside has many villages with pesantren and strong allegiances to stricter forms of Islam. In contrast, villages closer to the Kraton palaces of Surakarta and Yogyakarta tend to be more influenced by syncretic views of Javanese beliefs.

Jesuits have long had a presence in the town, having a school, seminary, and a necropolis containing the remains of many of their earlier members. Frans van Lith, a Jesuit priest from The Netherlands, arrived in Muntilan in 1897 and played an important role in promoting Catholicism in the area. Indonesia's first Catholic cardinal, Justinus Darmojuwono, is buried in Kerkhoof Muntilan, a cemetery for prominent Catholics in the town.

During the Second World War, Muntilan was the site of a Japanese prisoner of war camp which contained many Dutch families.

== Current ==
The streetscape of Muntilan along Jl. Pemuda (Pemuda Street) provides one of the more classic street views in Central Java. The line of shop-fronts, and the enclave of Chinese-based businesses in the central area, provide clues as to the nature of commercial development in the town over the last century.

The area is at an ever-present risk of natural disasters caused by the eruptions of Mount Merapi. In 1994, for example, a pyroclastic flow from Mount Merapi killed over 20 people in the Muntilan area.
