= Frans van Lith =

Dutch Roman Catholic missionary (1863–1926)

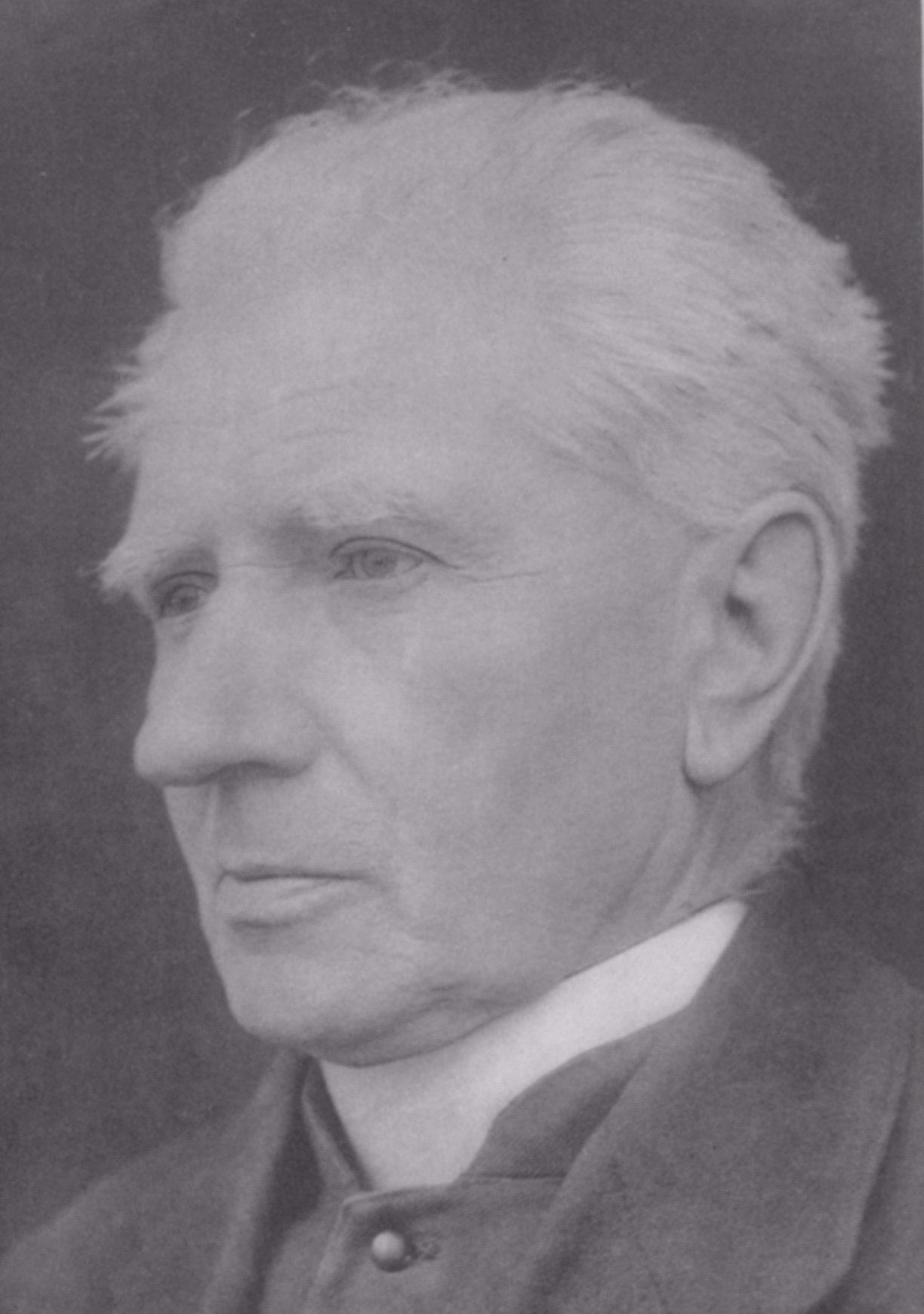
Frans van Lith

Franciscus Georgius Josephus "Romo" van Lith, SJ, often Frans van Lith (Javanese:ꦫꦺꦴꦩꦺꦮꦤ꧀ꦭꦶꦛ꧀; 17 May 1863 – 9 January 1926), was a Dutch Jesuit priest who pioneered the Catholic mission in Java, especially Central Java. Van Lith baptized the first Javanese at Sendangsono, founded a school for teachers in Muntilan, and fought for the education of Javanese people during Dutch colonial rule.

Van Lith was renowned because of his ability to synchronize Catholic teachings with that of Kejawen so that it could be accepted by the Javanese societies. Today in Eastern and Central Java, Catholicism is practised by many Javanese as well as people of Chinese descent. Pope John Paul II, when giving a speech in Yogyakarta in 1989, said that he was commemorating those who had laid the foundations of the Catholic people there: van Lith and two of his disciples, Albertus Soegijapranata and IJ Kasimo.

== Biography ==
Van Lith arrived in Semarang in 1896 to study the culture and customs of Java. He was placed in Muntilan in 1897. He stayed in Desa Semampir at the banks of River Lamat. On 14 December 1904, van Lith baptized 171 villagers from the region of Kalibawang in Sendangsono, Kulon Progo. This event is regarded as the birth of the Church among the Javanese when the 171 people become the first Javanese to embrace Catholicism. The location of the baptism is now the pilgrimage center Sendangsono.

=== Native education ===
In the small village of Semampir he built a school and a church. He also begun the building of the Catholic school complex in Muntilan, starting with the "Normaalschool" in 1890, a school for teachers or "Kweekschool" in 1904 and then a school for head teachers in 1906. This school for teachers was open for all native Javanese, from all religions. It started with 107 students, 32 of whom are non-Catholics.

In 1911 the Mertoyudan Seminary was officially founded, the first in Indonesia, built in part because some of the school's alumni wanted to become priests. One of them was Mgr A. Soegijapranata SJ (1896-1963), who would later become the Archbishop of Semarang, the first Indonesian native bishop.

The small church and school at Semampir would then develop into a complex of buildings, which was named Kolese Franciscus Xaverius in 1911. In 1948, the school complex was burned.

This education beginning in Muntilan would create Indonesian Catholic politicians, such as Kasimo and Frans Seda, amongst others.

In Klaten, van Lith tried to establish a Hollands Inlandse School (HIS, a primary school for Indonesian children). Initially the effort did not receive the permission of the Assistant Resident, because in Klaten there was already a Protestant HIS. Because of the refusal, Father van Lith proposed directly to the Resident of Surakarta (Solo). His proposal was accepted, and in 1920 HIS Kanisius Klaten was established and education activities started.

Van Lith fought for the education of the native Javanese. He sent students to Dutch universities and urged the Society of Jesus to build colleges.

=== Politics ===
He was a member of the Education Council ("Onderwijsraad") in 1918. That year he was also elected as a member of the Commission for Hearing of the Statehood of the Dutch Indies (Commissie tot Herziening van de Grondslagen der Staatsinrichting van Nederlandsch-Indië). The commission was founded for the realization of the Dutch government's attempt to create the state rules of the Dutch Indies, which would involve both Dutch and natives. To the commission van Lith demanded a position for a native delegation in the "Volksraad".

He was also recommended as member of the "Volksraad" (People's Council) by the Sarekat Islam Party, led by van Lith's close friend, K.H. Agus Salim. However, he was never elected to the People's Council.

During his time as member of both the Education Council and the Commission for Hearing of the Statehood of the Dutch Indies, Romo van Lith fought for the causes of the native Indonesians, something which the Dutch government did not like. In 1920 van Lith returned to the Netherlands to tend for his faltering health. When he tried to return to Indonesia, he faced opposition from the Dutch government.

=== Return to Indonesia ===
In 1924 van Lith finally returned and chose to stay in Semarang, establishing a Hollandsch-Inlandsche School (HIS) and a "Standaardschool" while teaching Jesuit novices. Van Lith died on 9 January 1926 in Semarang and was interred in the Jesuit cemetery in Muntilan.

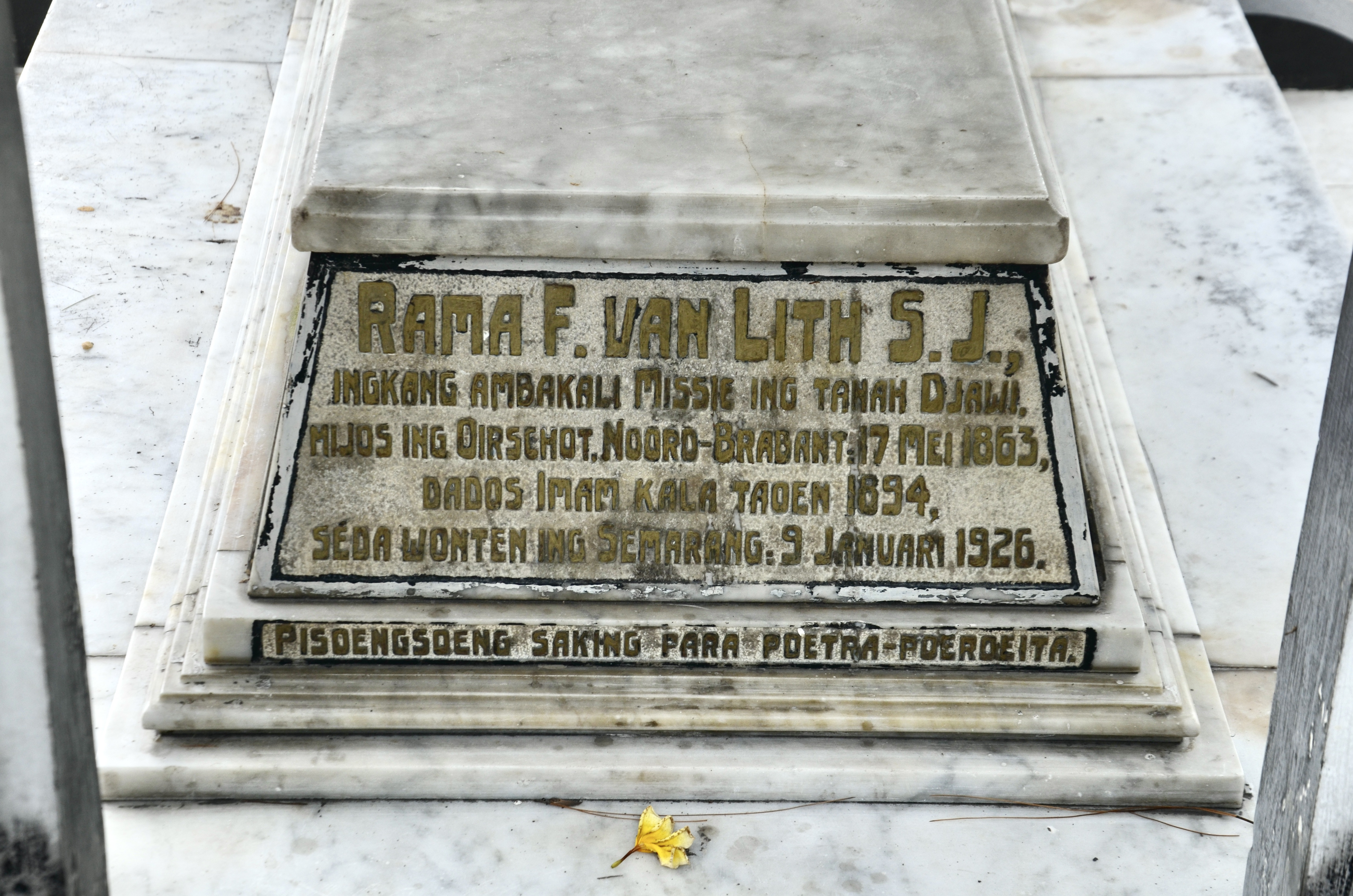
Headstone at the cemetery in Muntilan

== See also ==
- Albertus Soegijapranata - one of van Lith's disciples who went on to become Indonesia's first native bishop
- Roman Catholicism in Indonesia
