= Mandi-Mandi =

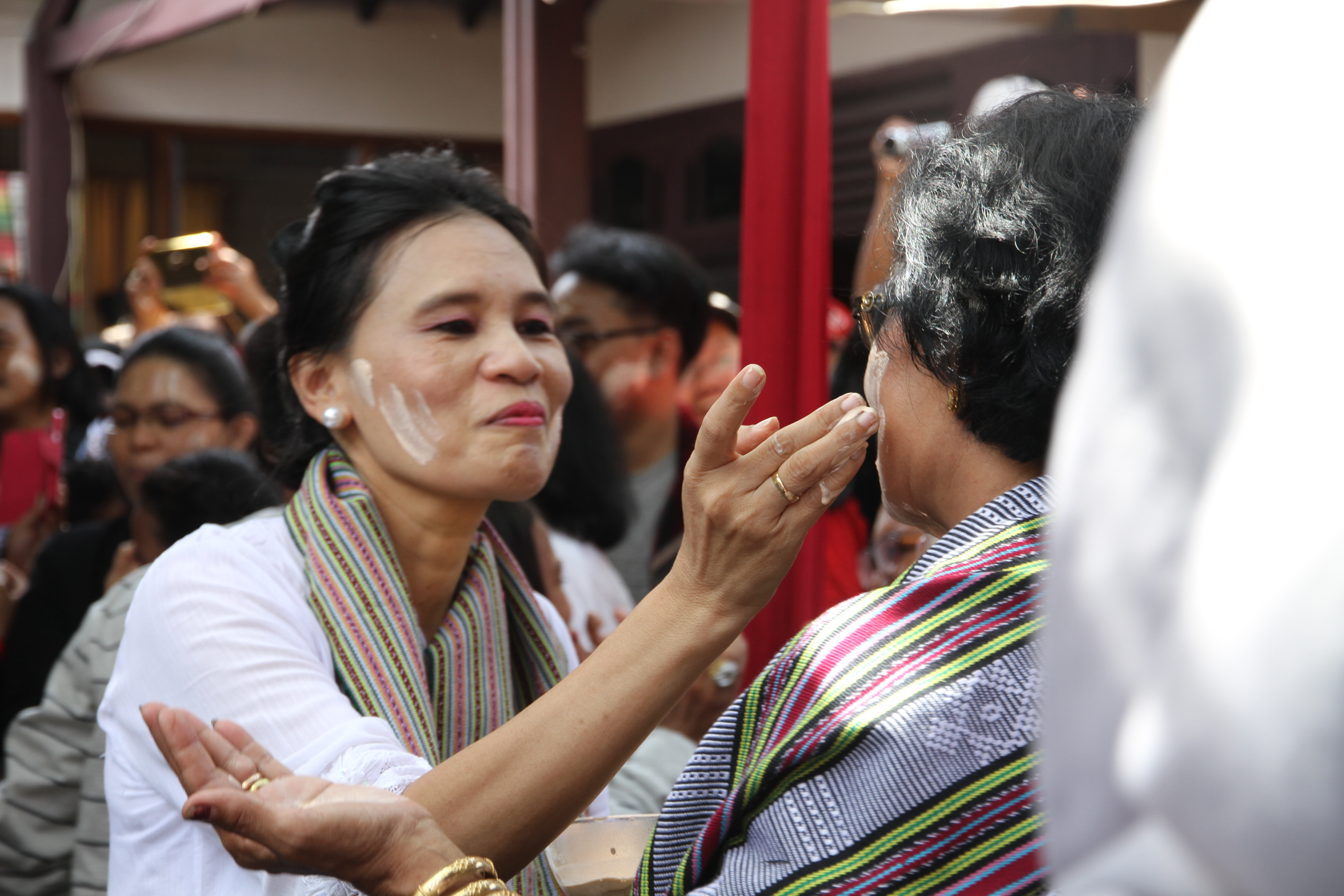
Mandi-Mandi in Kampung Tugu

Mandi-Mandi is an annual traditional ceremony held by Tugu Community Association (IKBT) in Kampung Tugu, Cilincing, North Jakarta. This tradition is celebrated as a way to mark the beginning of the new year. Mandi-Mandi is recognized as one of Jakarta's Intangible Cultural Heritages and was officially registered by the Ministry of Primary and Secondary Education under registration number 362/M/2019.

== Etymology and meaning ==
Although the word mandi in Indonesian literally means "to bathe" or "to cleanse oneself with water," in the context of this tradition, the act of bathing is not interpreted literally as using water. Arthur James Michiels, the Secretary of the Tugu Community Association, explained that the word mandi originates from the Portuguese word mandar, which means "to give an order". In the Mandi-Mandi traditional ceremony, this "command" refers to the call to love and forgive one another.

The tradition is understood as a moment to atone for past wrongdoings and to ask forgiveness for mistakes made over the past year. It also symbolizes self-purification and the cleansing of the heart. Participants gather to forgive each other and start the new year with a clean heart. Additionally, Mandi-Mandi signifies the residents’ readiness to welcome the new year, strengthens ties among residents, and reflects the deep sense of kinship that characterizes the Kampung Tugu community.

== History ==
The Mandi-Mandi tradition is closely tied to the Portuguese cultural heritage in Kampung Tugu. The people of Kampung Tugu are descendants of the Mardijkers, which means "the freed people." The Mardijkers were former soldiers and prisoners of war from the Portuguese side who were defeated by the Dutch. They were of mixed ethnicity between Portuguese and people from Coromandel, Bengal, and the Maluku.

In 1661, the Mardijkers were granted their freedom on the condition that they convert from Catholicism to Protestantism. From that point on, they were known as De Mardijkers and gradually erased their Portuguese identity and held the same social status as the native population. They later dispersed, with some choosing to settle in Batavia and others in Kampung Tugu, where they maintained stronger social bonds. The Tugu Church, built in 1747 and inaugurated in 1748, is one of the remaining Portuguese legacies in Kampung Tugu. The Mandi-Mandi tradition is believed to have existed since 1930.

== Ritual practice ==
Mandi-Mandi is held every first Sunday of the new year. During this celebration, the residents of Kampung Tugu apply white powder to each other’s faces. The powder used is plain white powder, unlike India’s Holi Festival, which uses colourful powders made from natural materials.

The ritual begins with a community elder applying powder to the face of one of the Portuguese descent participants. After that, everyone present is free to smear powder on each other’s faces. The event takes place in a spirit of togetherness and is accompanied by keroncong, especially Keroncong Tugu. A song titled Mande-Mande (Mandi-Mandi) was specially composed for this ritual to ensure it endures for generations. Initially, the tradition was held privately due to concerns that public exposure might diminish its sacred value and meaning. However, since 1990, anyone has been welcome to participate in mandi-mandi.

== The Betawi-Portuguese Cultural Fusion ==
The Mandi-Mandi ritual does not fully reflect pure Portuguese culture; rather, it has blended with Betawi culture. This cultural fusion is evident in various aspects. Mardjikers sometimes wear kebaya, while keroncong musicians dress in traditional Betawi-style white baju koko, combined with European-style flat caps and scarves. Traditional dishes served include Kampung Tugu-style gado-gado siram and Udang Pisang, a traditional Mardijker moist cake. The Tugu people themselves are recognized as a Portuguese-descended community who identify as Betawi.

== Bibliography ==
=== Online sources ===
- "Mandi-Mandi". Budaya Kita Kemendikbud.
- "Foto: Tradisi Mandi-Mandi Awali Tahun Baru di Kampung Tugu". Kumparan Travel. 2025-01-05.
- "Mandi-Mandi Adat Kampung Tugu, Sebuah Cerita tentang Perintah". Tempo. 2020-01-06.
- "Holi-nya Jakarta: Mandi-Mandi, Tradisi Kampung Tugu yang Penuh Makna". Seni Budaya Jakarta. 2024-12-04.
- Kanaka, Weka (2023-01-09). "Mandi-mandi Tak Hanya Dinikmati Warga Kampung Portugis, Bisa Juga Buat Turis Baca artikel detikTravel, "Mandi-mandi Tak Hanya Dinikmati Warga Kampung Portugis, Bisa Juga Buat Turis". Detik Travel.
- "Mandi-Mandi". Warisan Budaya.
