= Tugu =

Tugu may refer to:

- National Monument (Malaysia) or Tugu Negara, a monument in Kuala Lumpur, Malaysia
- Tugu Yogyakarta, a monument in Yogyakarta, Indonesia
- Tugu Muda, a monument in Semarang, Indonesia
- Tugu Keris, a monument in the shape of a kris in Klang, Malaysia
- Heroes Monument or Tugu Pahlawan, a monument in Surabaya, Indonesia
- Mardijker Creole or Papiá Tugu, an extinct Portuguese-based Jakartan creole
- Tugu inscription, a stone inscription of Tarumanagara origins dating to the 5th century

== Locations ==
- Tugu, Ghana, a community in the Tamale Metropolitan District, Northern Region, Ghana
- Tugu Stadium, a stadium used by the Indonesian football club Persitara
- Yogyakarta railway station, a train station in Yogyakarta, Indonesia commonly referred to as Stasiun Tugu
- Kampung Tugu, a subdistrict of Koja, North Jakarta
  - Tugu Church, a Protestant church located here
