= Koja, Jakarta =

District in Jakarta Utara Administrative City, Indonesia

Koja
- District
- Kecamatan Koja
- Interactive map of Koja
- Country: Indonesia
- Province: Jakarta
- Administrative City: North Jakarta
- Postal code: 141XX

Koja is a district of North Jakarta, Indonesia. It is known as the location of Kampung Tugu, a historic Portuguese-influenced neighborhood in North Jakarta.

Koja contains the eastern section of Tanjung Priok Port (which contains the Container Terminal 1, Container Terminal 3, and Koja Container Terminal), Jakarta's main port. The Sunter Canal flows to the sea via Koja, its outlet lies on the boundary between Koja District and Cilincing District.

The boundaries of Koja is Jakarta Bay to the north, Laksamana Yos Sudarso Tollway to the west, Pelabuhan Minyak - Kali Baru - Kramat Jaya Road - Kali Cakung to the east, and Kali Batik to the south.

== History ==
=== Kampung Tugu ===
In 1641 the Dutch Republic nation took Malacca from the Portuguese. A large number of people of Portuguese descent in Malacca were evacuated to Batavia, the Dutch East India Company headquarters, as war captives, where they settled in an area called Koja or Kampung Tugu".

During the early 18th century, a portion of land in what is now Tugu Administrative Village in Koja Subdistrict, was given to Melchior Leydekker. Melchior Leydekker was a Dutch doctor of medicine and theology who was placed in Batavia (1675), as he was at that time the son-in-law of the Governor General Abraham van Riebeeck. This new area, called Tugu, was developed as a neighborhood for the freed slaves known as Mardijker people. This area, now called Kampung Tugu, is the oldest Christian neighborhood in the west of Indonesia. Several buildings in this neighborhood dates back to the 17th century, such as the Tugu Church, thought to be built between 1676-1678.

The neighborhood still exists today, and retains its own distinct culture characteristic of Jakarta, such as the Portuguese-influenced musical style Kroncong Tugu spoken in the extinct Papia Tugu language.

=== Kramat Tunggak red-light district ===
In 1972, a red-light district known as Kramat Tunggak (abbreviated as Kramtung) was established in Tugu Utara Administrative Village under then-Jakarta Governor Ali Sadikin's policy to "localize" prostitutes in the area into a single complex. Covering an area of 109,435 m^{2}, the complex faced opposition from the local Muslim community. The complex provided work for about 3,000 prostitutes and provided health checks, clinics and condoms. In 1998, following the fall of president Suharto, Jakarta Governor Sutiyoso decided to close the red-light district. The entire complex was officially closed on 31 December 1999. Sutiyoso said the closure was a signal from God. "We are reminded that this is wrong and we should go back to the right path," he said. At the time of the closing, the complex contained 277 brothels, with 1,615 prostitutes under the supervision of 258 brothel keepers. Some of the sex workers were later provided with training for new jobs, but many simply moved to plying their trade on the streets or to brothels a few kilometers to the north.

In 2002, an Islamic learning center called Jakarta Islamic Center (JIC) was established on the site of the former red-light district. Completed in 2003 and covering an area of 7 ha, the center contains a 6,000 m^{2} mosque and a place for Islamic learning.

== Kelurahan (Administrative Village) ==
The district of Koja is divided into seven kelurahan ("administrative villages"):

- Koja Utara - area code 14210
- Koja Selatan - area code 14220
- Rawa Badak Utara - area code 14230
- Rawa Badak Selatan - area code 14230
- Tugu Utara - area code 14260
- Tugu Selatan - area code 14260
- Lagoa - area code 14270

== List of important places ==
- Jakarta Islamic Center (built on former Kramat Tunggak red-light district)
- Rawa Badak Stadium
- Tugu Church
