= Gereja Sion =

Protestant church in Jakarta, Indonesia

Sion Church
- Portuguese Buitenkerk, Jassen Kerk, GPIB Jemaat Sion DKI Jakarta, Gereja Sion
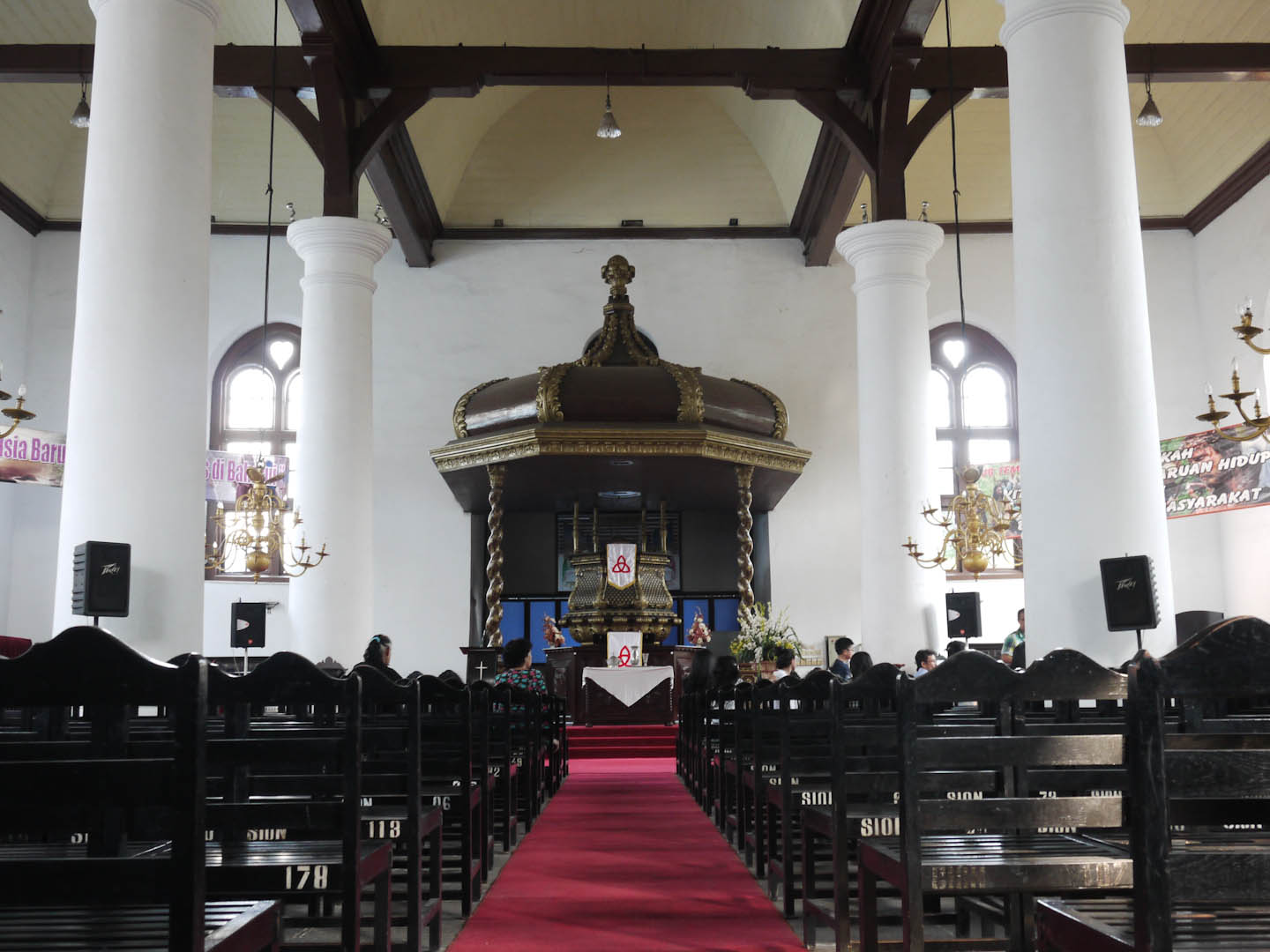
- Nave of the Sion Church, 2011

Religion
- Affiliation: Protestantism
- Ecclesiastical or organisational status: Protestant Church in Western Indonesia
- Year consecrated: 1695
- Status: active

Location
- Location: Jl. Pangeran Jayakarta, Taman Sari, Central Jakarta, Indonesia
- Interactive map of Sion Church
- Coordinates: 6.1381264°S 106.8177903°E

Architecture
- Architect: Ewout Verhagen of Rotterdam
- Type: Hall church
- Style: Early Dutch colonial
- Groundbreaking: 19 October 1693
- Completed: 1695

Sion Church (Gereja Sion, officially Gereja Protestan di Indonesia bagian Barat Jemaat Sion DKI Jakarta, or often contracted to GPIB Jemaat Sion DKI Jakarta) is a historic Protestant church located in Pinangsia Administrative District, Taman Sari, Jakarta, Indonesia, with a structure that dates to the late 17th century. It is the oldest building in Jakarta that still serves its original function and perhaps the oldest, still-active, continuously functioning Protestant church in Asia.

Roots of the church has been traced to 1676, as a modest, impermanent chapel with Portuguese language service for the Mardijker people and Christian population with native or mixed ethnicity of Batavia. Historically, the church was often designated as Portugese Buitenkerk "The Outer Portuguese Church." Due to the growth of congregation, Buitenkerk was rebuilt by the Dutch East Indies Company into a permanent building between 1693 and 1695, the form of which do not change much to this day. After the Indonesian independence, Buitenkerk was officially renamed to GPIB Jemaat Sion or Gereja Sion in 1957. In addition to the overall building, various colonial artefacts are still held in this church such as furniture, memorial boards, and gravestones.

== Name and congregation ==
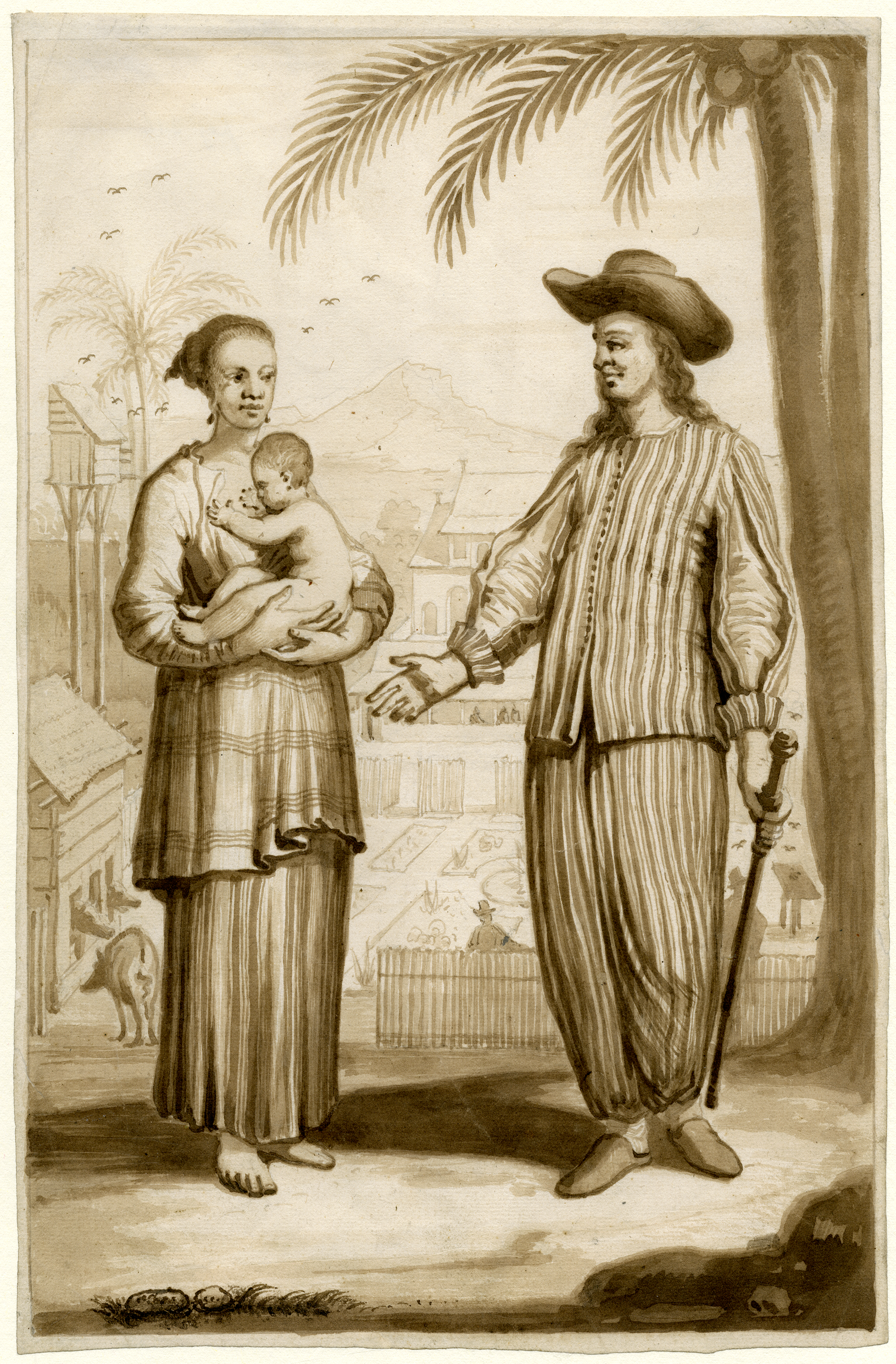
Illustration of a Mardijker couple from the 1700s, one of Sion Church's main congregation member and patron.

What is now known as Sion Church was known by several designations throughout its history. Most historical sources designate the church as Portugese Buitenkerk (Outer Portuguese Church). (Note: With a variety of spelling such as Portugese/Portugeesche/Portugeeſche, Buitenkerk/Buiten Kerk/Buytenkerk/Buÿtenkerk.) The Dutch term buiten- (outer) in the name refers to its location outside the Batavian city wall, which also differentiated the church with an existing Portugese Binnenkerk (Inner Portuguese Church). As the establishment of the Binnenkerk precedes Buitenkerk, the later's status was sometimes further clarified with the name Nieuwe Portuguese Buitenkerk (New Portuguese Outer Church).

The word Portugese appended to Binnenkerk dan Buitenkerk did not literally meant the Portuguese people, but rather the Mardijker people and various Christianized former slaves with native and mixed ethnicity in Batavia, the majority of which spoke Portuguese in their daily life. Due to the strong use of Portuguese among this population, the Dutch East Indies Company administration (more precisely, its Church Council Kerkenraad) considered it more practical to administer a separate church with Portuguese service rather than forcing Mardijker congregation to learn and use Dutch in a single church. This was also done as a form of ethnic control and segregation; Dutch congregation would use Batavia's Dutch Church (Gereja Belanda) (Note: The site of which is now occupied by the Wayang Museum.) while the Mardijker and native Christians would use the two Portuguese Churches; Binnenkerk serviced the higher class Mardijker while Buitenkerk serviced lower class Mardijker. (Note: Another church around Batavia that gave Portuguese service is located in Kampung Tugu which is now known as the Tugu Church.)

Aside from "Buitenkerk," some late 18th century maps of Batavia also designate the church as Jassen Kerk and Jassenkerkhof "Jassen Church." (Note: For example van Krevelt, Abraham (1780) Plan Der Stad En ’t Kasteel Batavia and Tency, P.J. (1797) Plattegrond van het kasteel en de stad Batavia) This name originates from a nearby bridge, Jassenbrug, that are captioned in some historic maps of Batavia. (Note: For example, van Krevelt, Abraham (1780) Plan Der Stad En ’t Kasteel Batavia) Eventually, the bridge, surrounding area, and a grave in the Buitenkerk's churchyard came to be associated with a certain Captain Jass who was credited as the area's namesake. However, this personage lacks any historical attestation and most likely an invention of folktales. (Note: When most of the churchyard's graves were relocated to Tanah Abang in the 1800s, and alleged grave of Captain Jass was also relocated.)

In 1806, Governor General Herman Willem Daendels ordered the demolition of Batavia's city walls and defense, rendering the "Buitenkerk" designation obsolete. In 1808, the Binnenkerk was burned down so that Buitenkerk remains the only "Portugese" designated church in Batavia. (Note: The church in Kampung Tugu at the time still holds Portuguese service until 1816, but Kampung Tugu itself at the time was administratively not part of the Batavia city.) However, most Mardijker congregation at the time have been assimilated by local population and no longer fluent in Portuguese. Church service was transitioning to the Malay language and the last Portuguese-fluent minister of the church, Abraham Anthonij Engelbrecht, died in 1808. The name Portugese Buitenkerk became non descriptive as it no longer provide Portuguese service nor located outside any city walls. However, the name Portugese Buitenkerk continue to be used until the Indonesian independence. After independence, Buitenkerk became administered under Protestant Church in Western Indonesia (Gereja Protestan di Indonesia bagian Barat, or GPIB), and in 1957 Buitenkerk was officially renamed to GPIB Jemaat Sion or Gereja Sion.

== Establishment ==
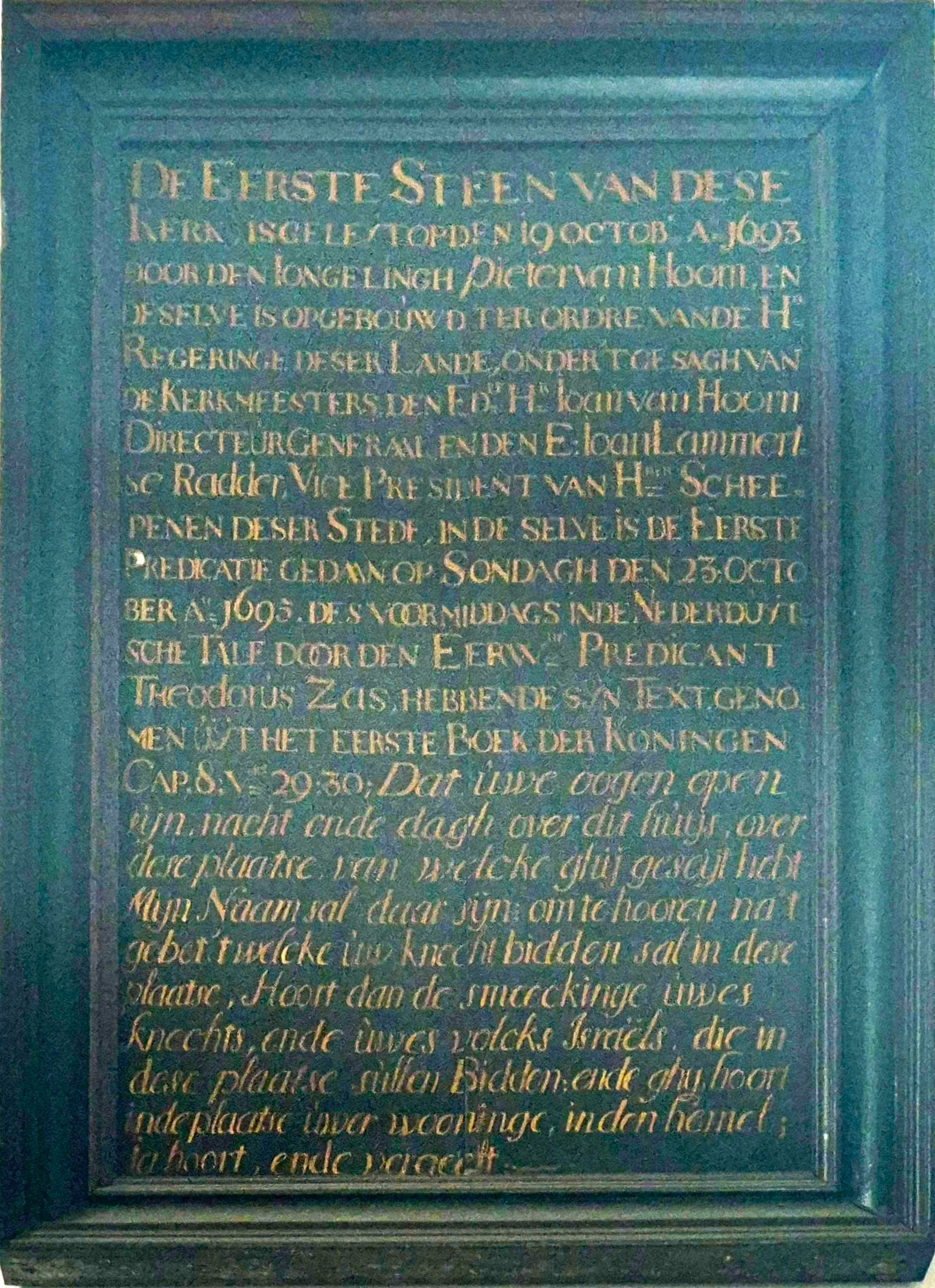
Wooden plaque of commemoration.

At least since 1655, the site that would eventually become Sion church has been used as burial grounds. In 1676, a simple chapel made of bamboo is noted to exist in the premise, serving Mardijker and native or mixed descent Christians living outside of Batavia's city walls. Due to increasing number of congregation, the Dutch East Indies administration planned to expand the church. Design responsibility fell to Ewout Verhagen of Rotterdam, head of Batavia's ambachskwartier (craft district), (Note: Around the same time, Ewout Verhagen was also noted to have worked as land surveyor for College van Heemraden.) whose design was approved by the company on 11 July 1692 during the tenure of Governor General Willem van Outhoorn (in office 1691–1704). Church construction was partly financed by funds meant for the diaconia of Dutch Formosa, which was rerouted to Batavia as Dutch rule on the island began to crumble since the Siege of Fort Zeelandia by Koxinga on 1662. Construction was also supported by charitable donations from wealthy Mardijker families and prominent Company officials such as Governor General Johannes Camphuys (in office 1684–1691). The first stone was laid on 19 October 1693 by a certain Pieter van Hoorn, most likely a young relative of Joan van Hoorn (later held the office of Governor General in 1704–1709).

The church was completed and consecrated on Sunday, 23 October 1695. Consecration was held twice; once in the morning by Minister Theodorus Zas in Dutch and once on the afternoon by Minister Jacobus op den Acker in Portuguese. The ceremonies was attended by Governor General Willem van Outhoorn and was commemorated by a wooden plaque that still hung inside Sion Church today. Part of the plaque (with general translation) reads:

De Eerste Steen van dese kerk, is geleyt op den 19 Octob[er]. A[nn]o. 1693 door den jongelingh Pieter van Hoorn, en deselve is opgebouwd ter ordre van de Ho Regeringe deser Lande, onder 't gesagh van de Kerkmeesters, den Edle. Hr. Ioan van Hoorn Directeur Generaal en den E. Ioan Lammertse Radder, Vice President van Hren. Scheepenen deser Stede, in de selve is de eerste predicatie gedaan op Sondagh den 23 October A[nn]o. 1695 des voormiddags in de Nederduijtsche Tale door den Eerwde. Predicant Theodorus Zas. Hebbende sijn text genomen uyt het eerste boek der koningen Cap 8 no 29.30...

Translation:

The first stone of this church was laid on 19 October year 1693 by the young Pieter van Hoorn, (Note: Pieter mentioned here is not Pieter van Hoorn (1619-1682), father of Joan van Hoorn, who have died by the time the church has started construction. Most likely there are another Van Hoorn relative named Pieter at the time.) and built by the order of the High Government of this Country, under the supervision of the Churchwarden (Keerkmester), the honorable Joan van Hoorn, and the honorable Joan Lammertse Radder, Vice President of this City Council (Aldermen). The first sermon was delivered on 23 October 1695, before noon in Dutch by Minister Theodorus Zas. On the occasion, the first Book of Kings chapter 8 verse 29-30 was read... (Note: In the second Portuguese consecration ceremony, Minister Acker read Psalms 84:2-4.)

== Building ==
Exterior documentations

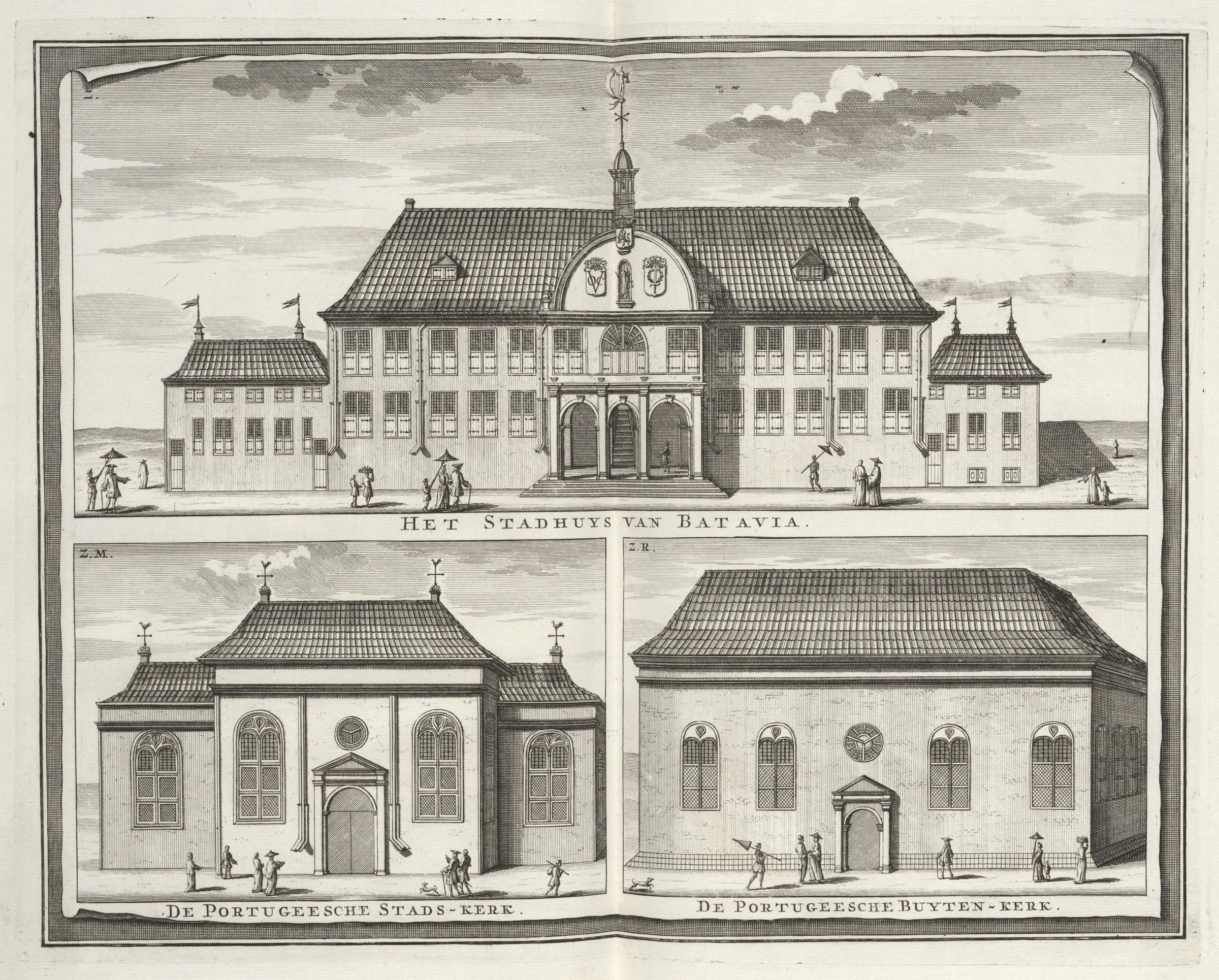
Front elevation of Portugese Binnenkerk (bottom left) and Buitenkerk (bottom right) in the 1724 publication by François Valentijn.

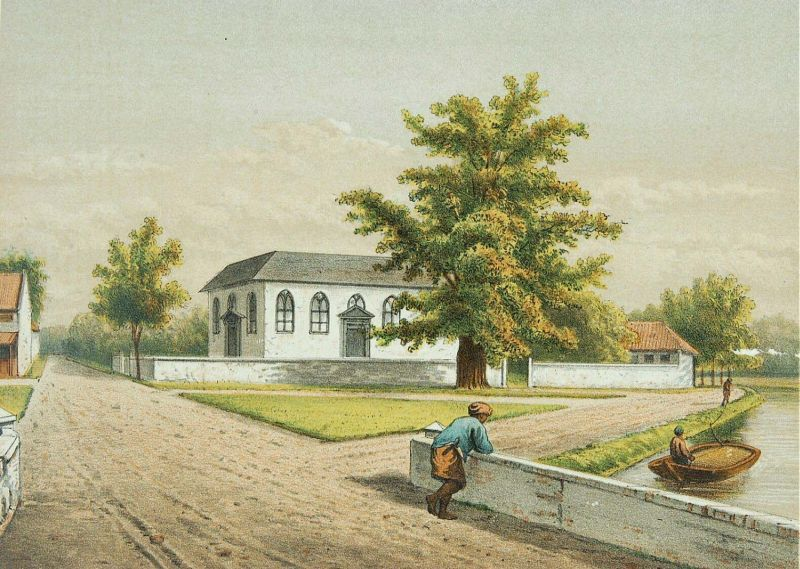
Litography from circa 1881–1889, west elevation of the church viewed from the Jassenbrug bridge crossing the city moats (Stadsbuitengracht). By Josias Cornelis Rappard.

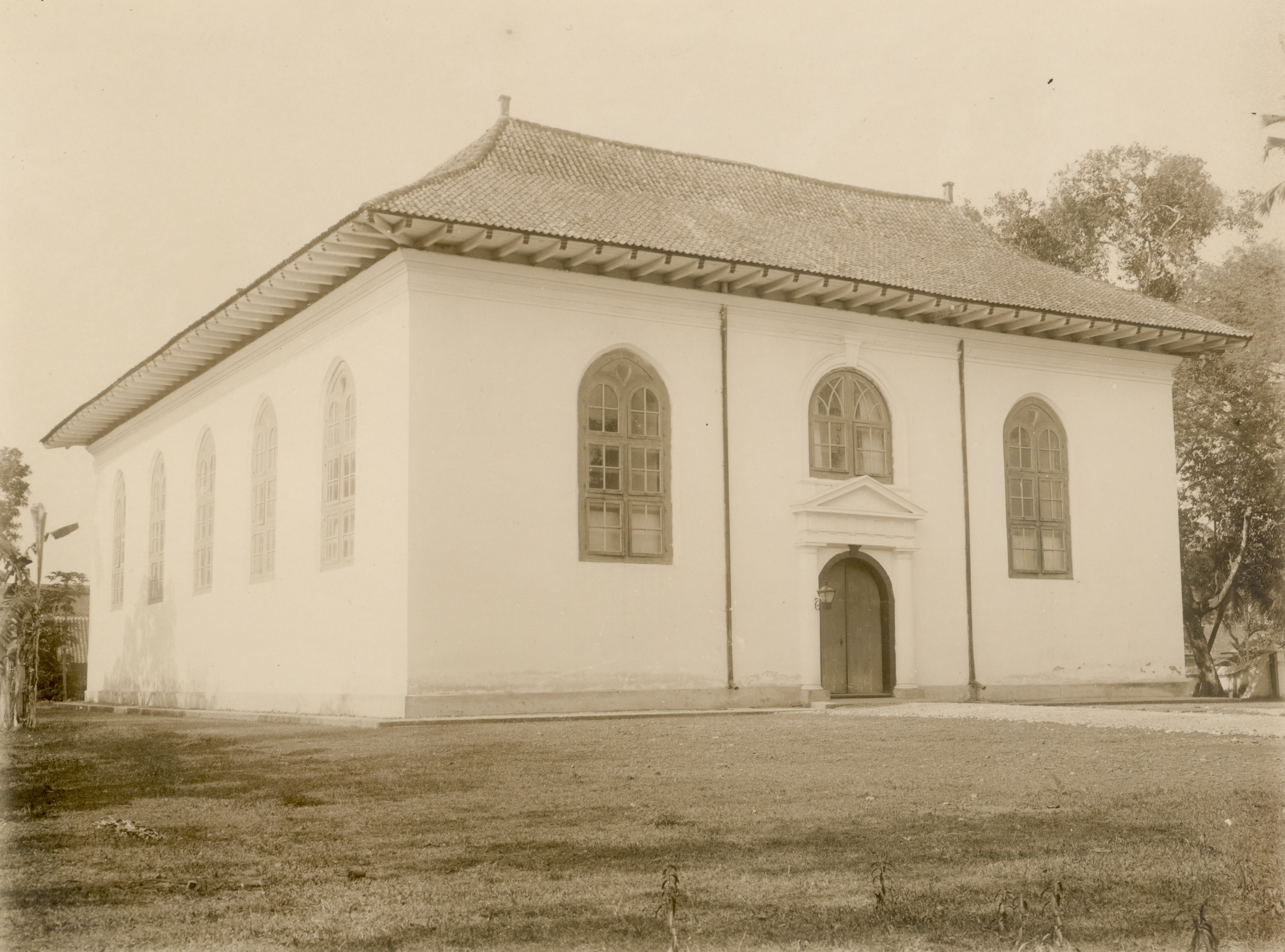
Photo from 1920 showing the northern elevation.

Photo from 1920 showing the northern elevation after the 1921 renovation, with the new roof.

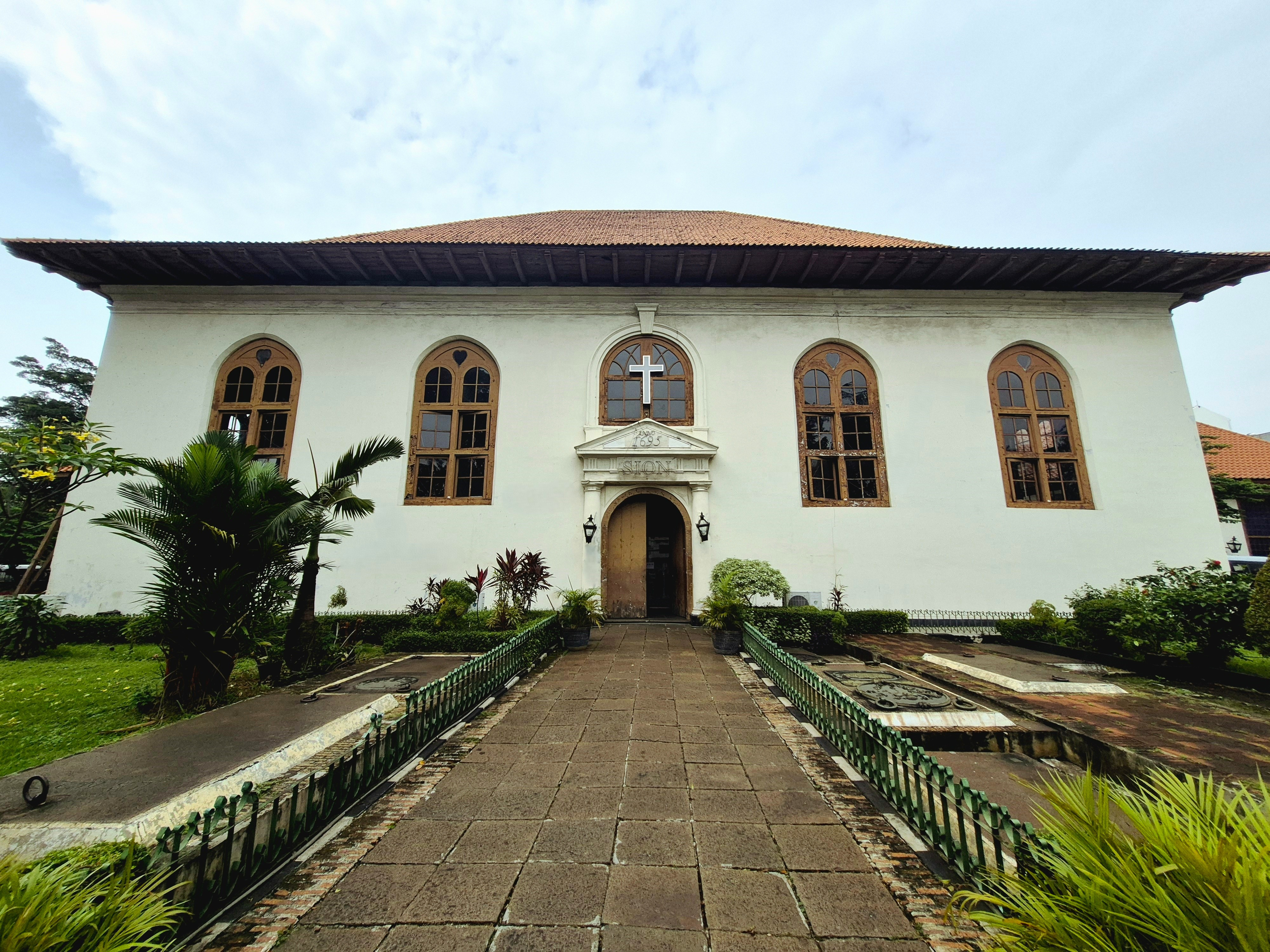
Photo of the building in 2025.

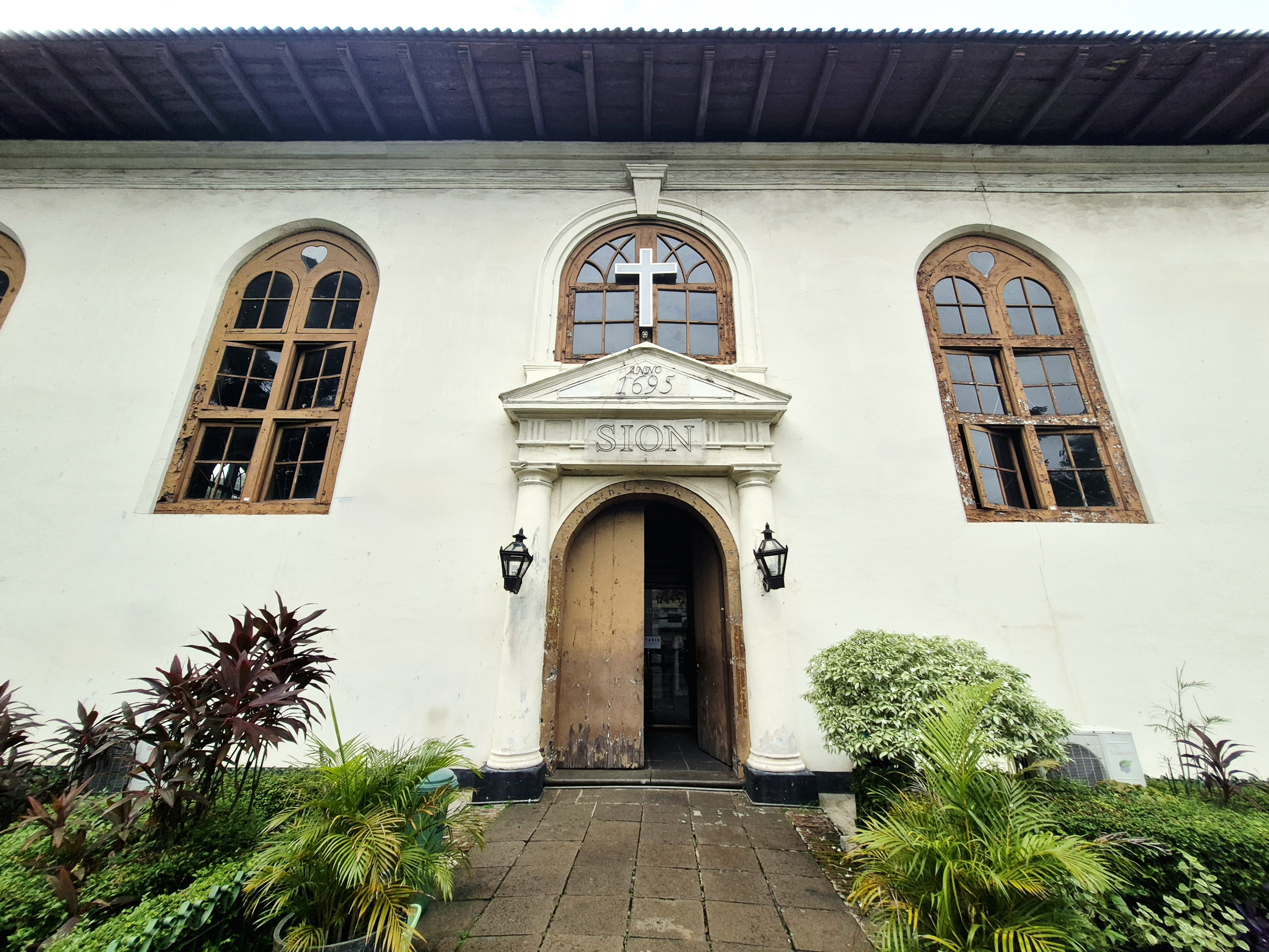
Details around the entrance.

Sion Church measures 24 by 32 meters and is situated on 6,725 square meters of land. An extension was built on the back facade, measuring 6 by 18 meters. It was built above a foundation of 10,000 logs. The construction is designed by E. Ewout Verhagen from Rotterdam. The wall is constructed from bricks glued by a mix of sand and heatproof sugar.

Sion Church is characteristically Dutch with its plain facade, ward-like appearance and domed windows. The church contains copper chandeliers, a baroque-style ebony pulpit, and the original organ. The furnishings were made by craftsmen from Formosa (Taiwan). The pipe organ was donated by the daughter of Reverend John Maurits Moor.

=== Interior and furniture ===
Interior documentations

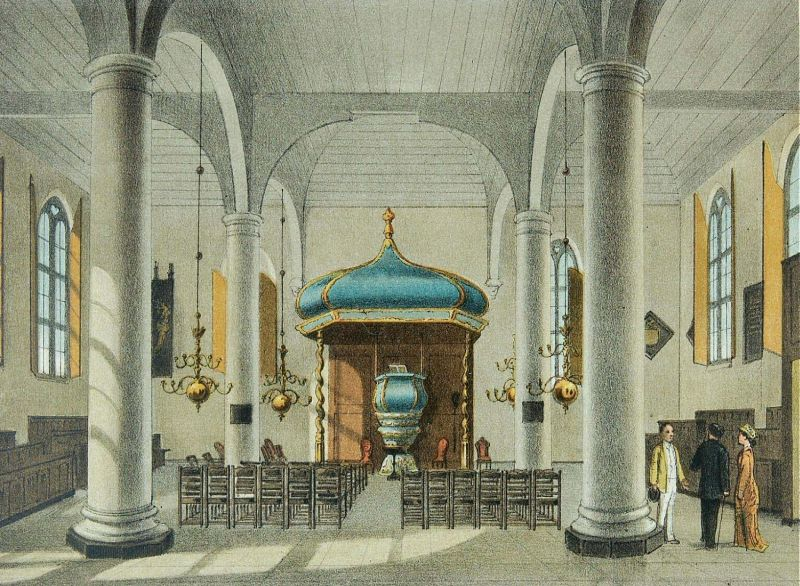
Lithography of the pulpit around 1881–1889. By Josias Cornelis Rappard.

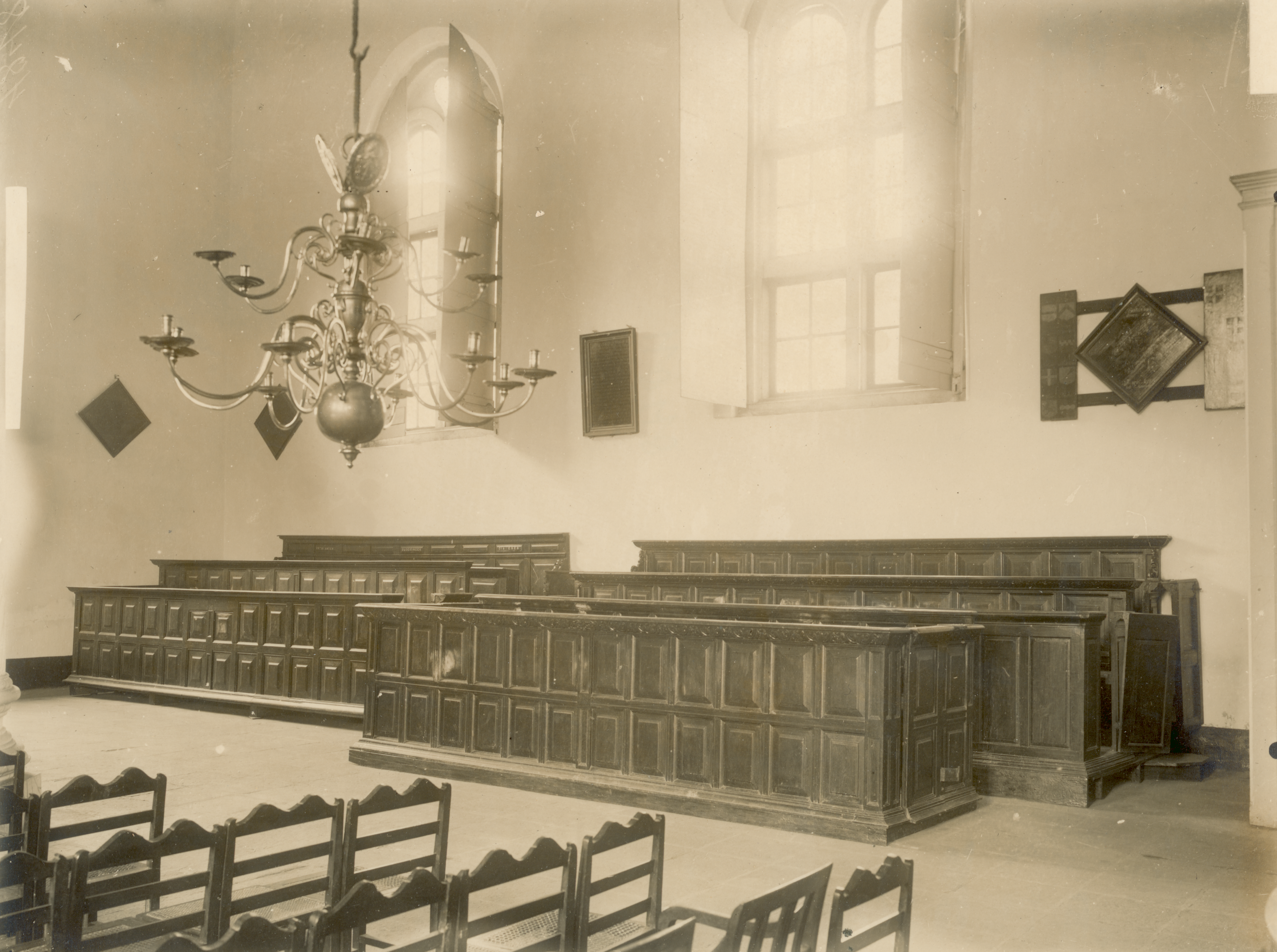
Photo of the ministers' seating, around 1920.

Photo of the renovation in 1921.

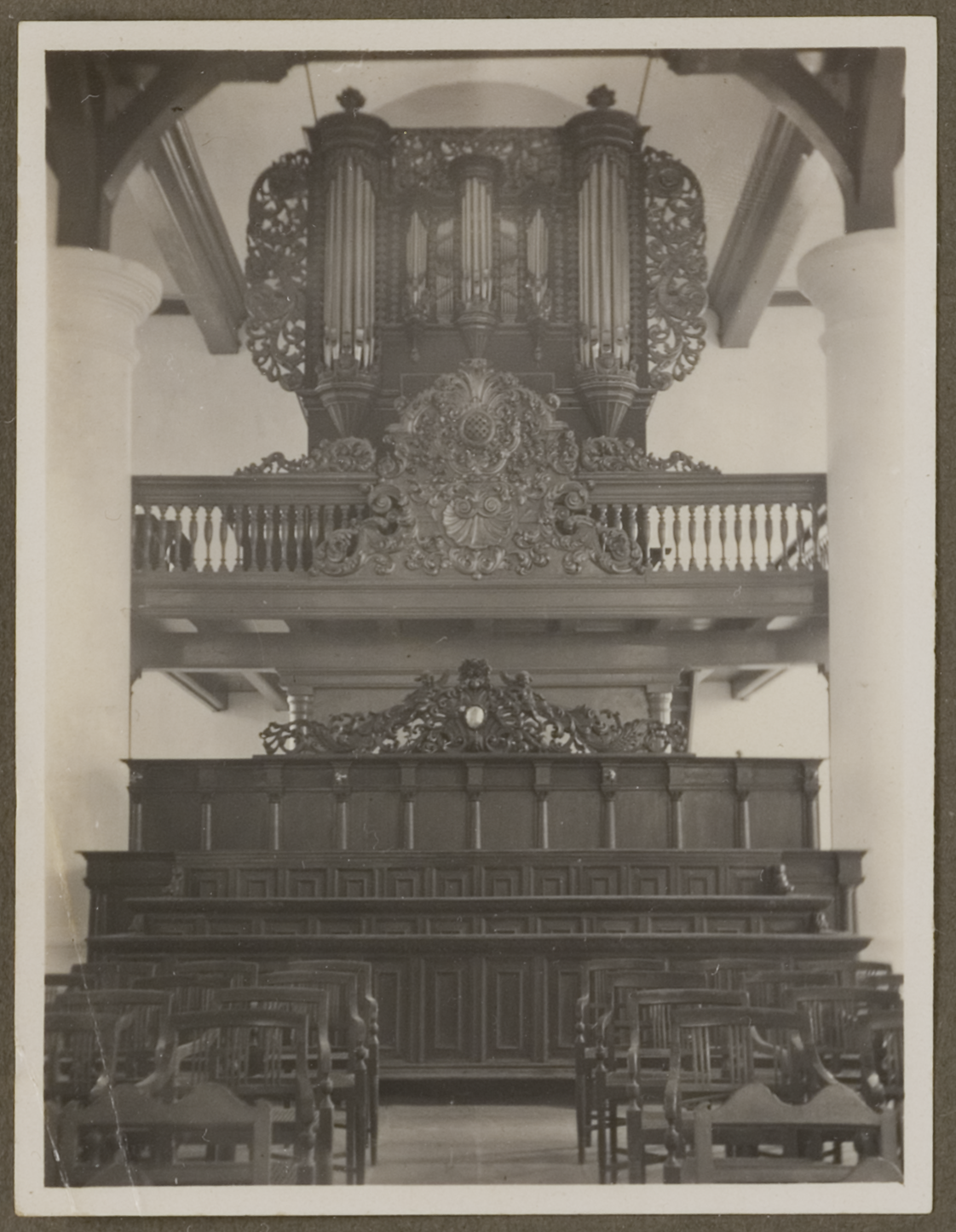
Photo of the pipe organ around 1925.

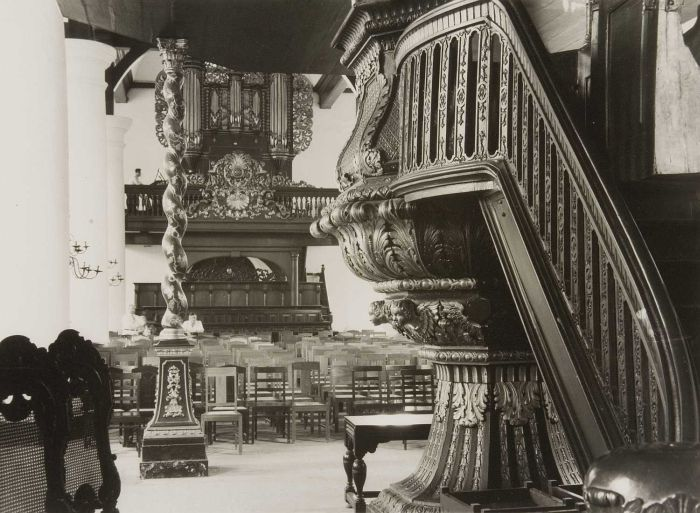
Photo of the pipe organ seen from the pulpit area, around 1945–1955.

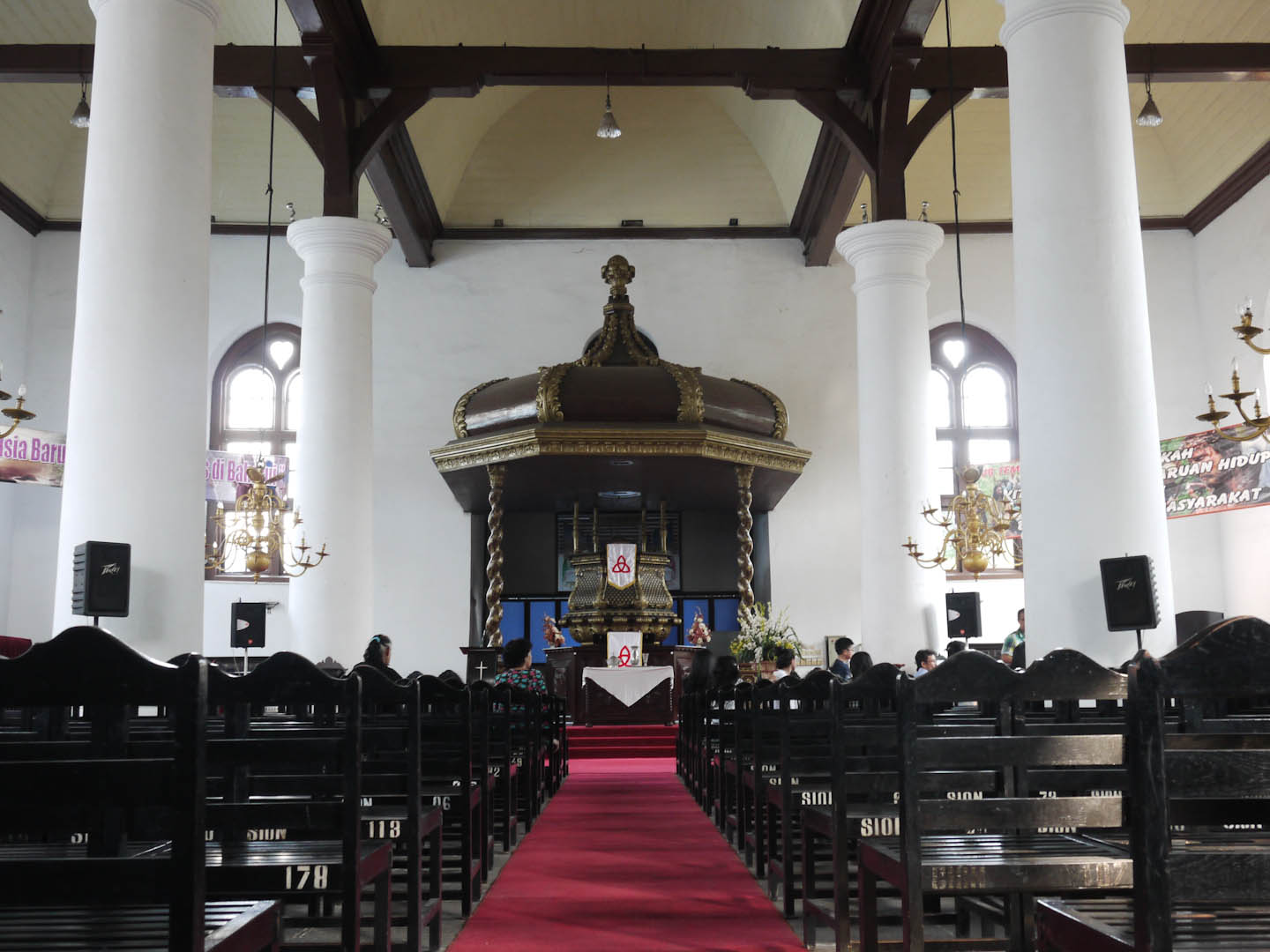
Photo of the pulpit in 2011.

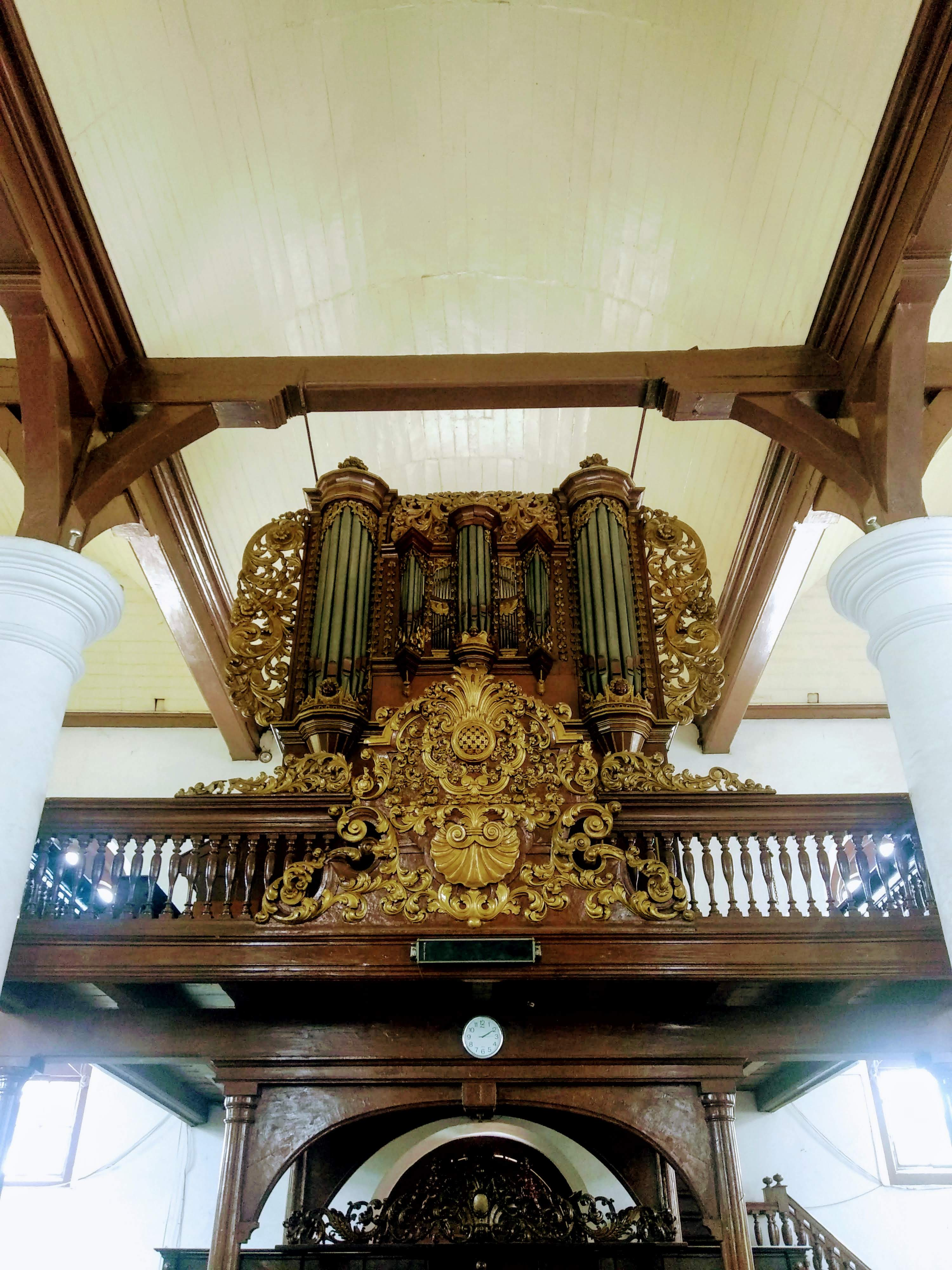
Photo of the pipe organ in 2020.

== Memorial plaques and gravestones ==
Much of the land surrounding Sion Church was originally a graveyard. Many Mardijkers and (mostly low ranking) Company employee were buried in the grounds. Currently, only 11 graves are still present in the western grounds of the church as well as a number of heraldric achievement or wapenbord hung in the interior space.

One of the remaining graves in the western grounds of the church is the grave of Governor General Hendrick Zwaardecroon, made of Coromandel stone and lavish bronze plaque. Based on his social status as a governor general, it was unusual for him to buried in a public grave such as Buitenkirk, but this was done in accordance to his own will to be buried among "ordinary people." Makam Zwaardecroon adalah salah satu dari tiga makam gubernur jenderal masa VOC yang tidak pernah dipindahkan dari tempat aslinya. Adjacent to Zwaadecroon's grave is the grave of a wealthy Mardijker couple Ragel Titise and her husband Titis Anthonijse who hailed from Bengal. According to Groll, it is unusual that the couple was able to afford a gravestone that is as elaborate as Zwaadecroon's.

Inside the building, there is the gravestone of Governor General Carel Reyniersz and his wife Judith Barra van Amstel. They donated the lands that would later become Binnenkerk but died before the church was completed. They were not buried in Buitenkerk, but when their gravestone was rediscovered in Surabaya on 1922 it was deemed appropriate to store it in Buitenkerk. On the walls of the church there are a number of wooden plaques with heraldric achievements of several individuals buried in the churchgrounds. One for example belong to Barent Ketel tot Hacfort, a Company commander once stationed in the Coromandel coast.

Plaques and gravestones documentations

Gravestone of Governor General Hendrick Zwaardecroon († 1728).

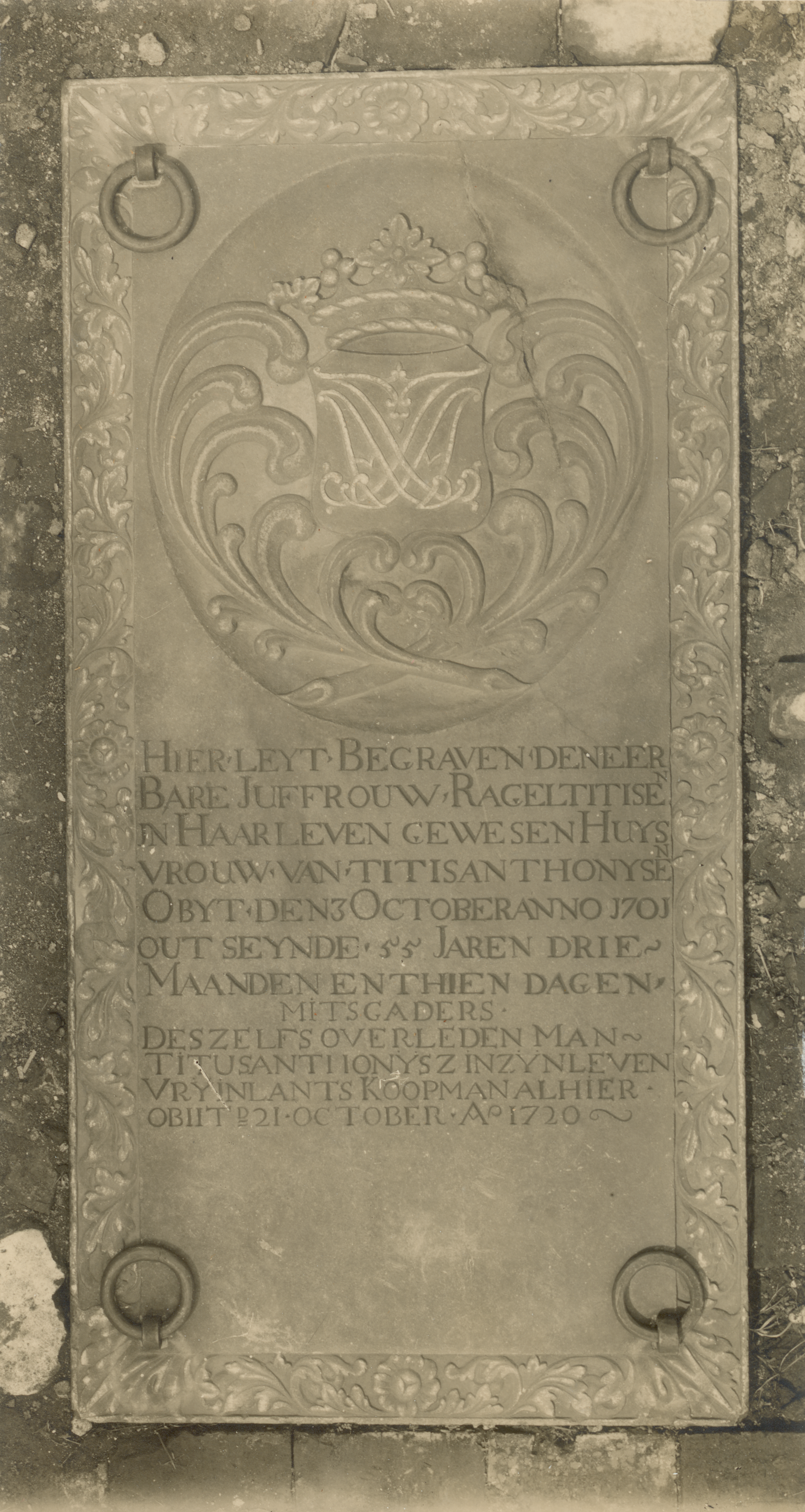
Gravestone of Ragel Titise († 1701) and her husband Titis Anthonijse († 1720).

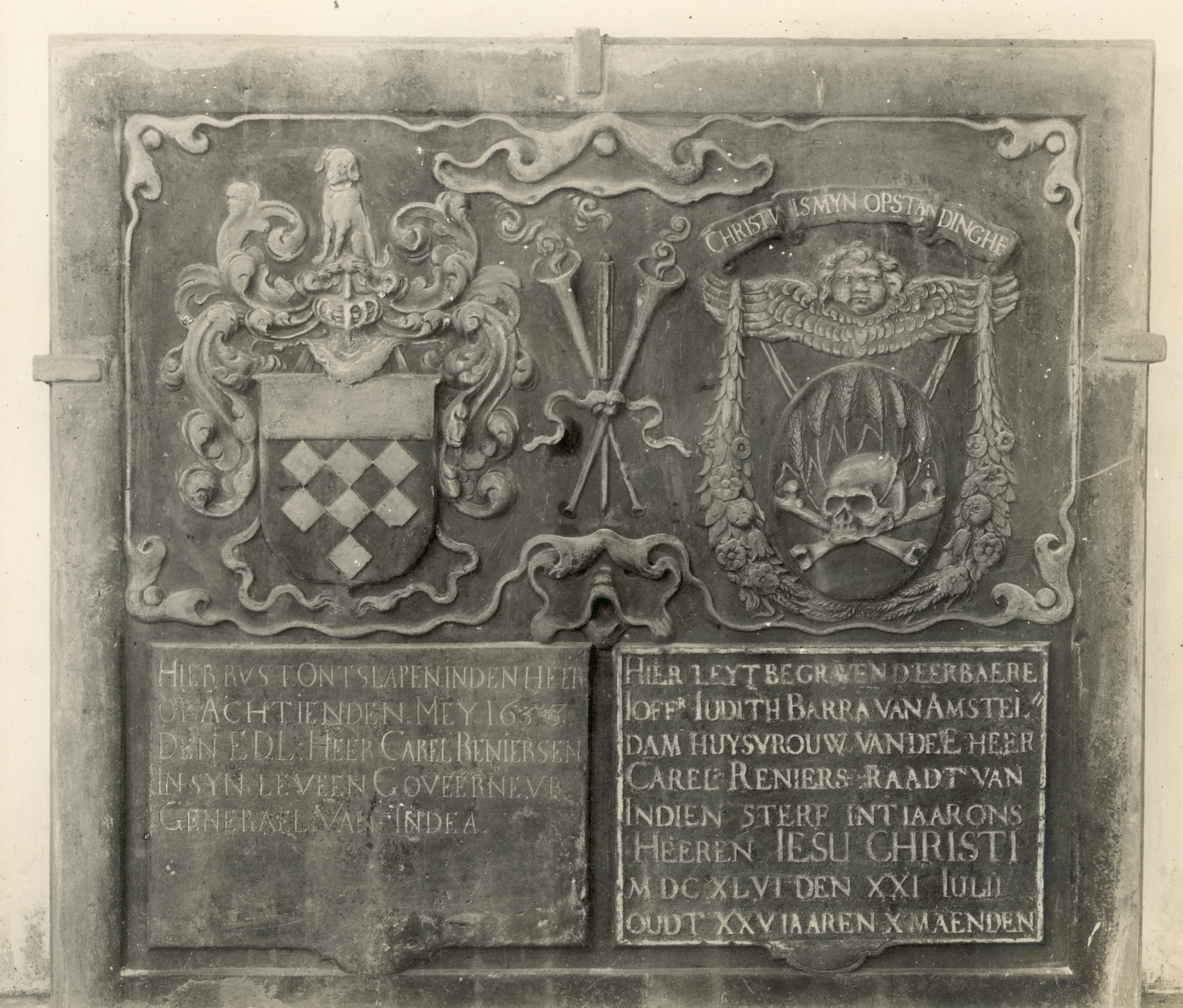
Gravestone of Governor General Carel Reyniersz († 1653) and his wife Judith Barra van Amstel († 1646).

Wapenbord of Barent Ketel tot Hacfort († 1719).

== See also ==
- List of church buildings in Indonesia
- History of Jakarta
