= Portuguese Indonesians =

Indonesians of Portuguese birth or descent

Portuguese Indonesian
Regions with significant populations
- Maluku, Flores, Jakarta, Surabaya, Aceh, West Timor

Languages
- Indonesian, Ambonese, Betawi, Portuguese, Tetum

Religion
- Roman Catholic, Protestantism, Calvinism, Sunni Islam

Related ethnic groups
- Betawi, Indo people, Luso-Asians & Luso-Indians

Portuguese Indonesians are native Indonesians with Portuguese ancestry or have had adopted Portuguese customs and some practices such as religion.

== The Black Portuguese ==
As a political entity in the eastern part of Insular Southeast Asia, the Torpasses (also called Black Portuguese or Bidau) arose with the Portuguese settlement on the small Island of Solor (from the 1560s), using Solor as a stepping-stone to the trade in sandalwood on Timor.

Briefly before 1600, Portuguese traders left Solor and settled in Larantuka. The traders were in conflict with the Spaniard Dominican missionaries in Solor, as they were more interested in trade than in Christianization. In 1613, the Dutch occupied Solor and the Dominicans moved to Larantuka too. When the Dutch East India Company conquered Solor in 1613, the Portuguese community also moved to Larantuka on Flores.

In the beginning Larantuka was an interstation for the trade of sandalwood from Timor and became the Portuguese trading center of South East Indonesia. It became even a place of refuge for deserters of the Dutch East India Company (VOC).

In spite of continuous hostilities with the Dutch, the Topasses managed to obtain a steady foothold on Timor after 1641, and part of the population of Larantuka moved over to West Timor in the late 1650s, as a response to the establishment of the VOC in Kupang in 1653. They were able to defeat Dutch military expeditions on Timor with the help of Timorese allies, in 1653, 1655, 1656 and 1657.

The peace treaty between Portugal and the Netherlands in 1663 removed the acute threat from the latter. By this time, the Topasses consisted of an ethnic mix of Portuguese, Florenese, Timorese, Indians, Dutch deserters, etc. Through their military skills they were able to dominate large parts of Timor, with their center in Lifau in the present-day Oecussi-Ambeno enclave.

Two waves of immigration brought additionally boost. As the Dutch conquered Malacca in 1641, they brought many Portuguese speaking people from Malacca to Batavia including those who are of Portuguese descent as slave, in 1661 they were released after given an option to abandon Catholicism for Protestantism, those who accepted were allowed to settle in Kampung Tugu and therefore recognized as Mardijker, while those who refused were banished to Flores. It is presumed that those who were banished would find themselves settling in Larantuka and the population grew healthily. Two villages, Wureh and Konga, also accommodated the new people.

The Larantuqueiros turned out a loose, but mighty power in the region, which influence reached far beyond the settlement. The core cell was the federation of Larantuka, Wureh and Konga. Theoretically they were subordinated to Portugal. But in practice they were free. They had no Portuguese administration and they did not pay taxes. Letters of the Lisbon government were ignored. For long years there was a bloody struggle for power between the families da Costa and de Hornay. At the end they shared the power.

The Larantuqueiros made "alliances" with the indigenous people of Flores and Timor. They followed a certain strategy; the most notable raja was converted to Catholicism by military pressure. He had to take an oath of allegiance to the king of Portugal and thereon the title Dom was granted to him. The raja was allowed to rule his folk autonomous, but in war he had to supply auxiliary forces.

== Setbacks and heritage ==
Portuguese influence was reduced to the areas of Solor, Flores and Timor, now in East Nusa Tenggara, following the defeat in 1575 at the hands of residents of Ternate. Decisive were also the Dutch conquest of Ambon, North Maluku and Banda, and a general failure to sustain control of trade in this region.

Compared with the initial ambition of dominating Asian trade, their influence, in comparison to the Dutch, on the culture of Indonesia is relatively small, but still significant regardless:

- keroncong guitar ballads;
- number of words in the Indonesian language absorbed from Portuguese, who had been a lingua franca alongside Malay

With the arrival of the Dutch and their conquest of Malacca, the Portuguese had their trading network disrupted. The Dutch also caused much of the conflict in the area which lasted for generations. The Portuguese, however continued the spread of early Christianity in Indonesia. Until now, the Christian population mostly found in eastern Indonesia.

In Kampung Tugu (Koja, North Jakarta) Some of the people there are descendants of the Portuguese or of the Goese, while some are descendants of slaves who are able to speak Portuguese, and were brought to Batavia (now Jakarta) as prisoners of war after the Dutch VOC conquered Malacca in 1641, those who are the descendants of the Portuguese were referred as the Tugu People, while those who are the descendants of the Portuguese speaking slaves are referred as the Mardijkers (Free people in Dutch); many have since converted to Protestantism.

In Lamno, Aceh, a community of people often noted for their blue eyes and fairer skin complexion are purportedly Muslim descendants of Portuguese. The 2004 Indian Ocean earthquake and tsunami dealt a great blow to the community however, with only less than 40% of the original Portuguese descendants survived.

Asides from Aceh and Jakarta, Portuguese descendants can also be found in the Eastern part of the country, particularly within the Maluku Islands, Flores and the Indonesian side of the Timor Island.

Despite the little legacy, relations between the two countries are recently improving, especially after the declaration of independence of East Timor, Around 600 Portuguese nationals are currently residing in Indonesia.

== Notable Portuguese Indonesians ==
Name	Birth and death	Occupation	Notes
José Abílio Osório Soares	1947–2007	Governor of Timor Timur	Portuguese descent
Andre Juan Michiels	born 1971	Keroncong figures Toegoe and Chairman of the Family of Kampung Toegoe	Portuguese descent
Don Andre Martinhus Diaz Vieira de Godinho		Larantuka leader, Flores Island	Portuguese descent
João Ferreira de Almeida	1628-1691	Protestant pastor and translator	Portuguese descent
Arnaldo da Silva Tavares	born 1970	Politician	Portuguese descent
João da Costa Tavares	1931–2009	Politician, former regent of Bobonaro	Portuguese descent
Jose Antonio Morato Tavares	born 1960	Diplomat	Portuguese descent
Gaspar da Costa	1749–?	The leader or lieutenant general of the Portuguese-speaking Topasses	Portuguese descent
Cornelis Senen	1600-1661	Merchant, namesake of the Senen district of Jakarta	Portuguese descent
Andy F. Noya	born 1960	Journalist and TV Presenter	Portuguese, Dutch and Ambonese descent
Nino Fernandez	born 1984	Actor	Minahasan, Sundanese, German and Portuguese descent
Elfin Pertiwi Rappa	born 1995	Model and beauty pageant	Portuguese descent
Paulus Samador da Cunha	1924-1976	Politician	Portuguese descent
Manuel Godinho de Erédia	1563–1623	17th century Portuguese Malaccan writer and cartographer.	Bugis-Portuguese descent

== See also ==
- Indonesia–Portugal relations
- Portuguese diaspora
- Ethnic groups in Indonesia
- Luso-Asians
- Mestiço
