= Malacca–Batavia Portuguese Creole =

Malacca–Batavia Portuguese Creole is a Glottolog classification that includes:

- Malaccan Creole Portuguese (Papia Kristang), spoken in Malacca, Malaysia
- Batavian Creole Portuguese (Mardijker), formerly spoken in Jakarta, Indonesia
