= Rawa Badak Utara =

North Rawa Badak (Rawa Badak Utara in Indonesian) is administrative village (kelurahan in Indonesian) at Koja subdistrict, North Jakarta. The border of Rawa Badak Utara are :

- Cipeucang Raya Street at Koja administrative village in the north
- Yos Sudarso Street at Tanjung Priok subdistrict in the west
- Pinang River (Kali Pinang in Indonesian) at Lagoa administrative village and North Tugu (Tugu Utara in Indonesian) administrative village in the east
- Layar River (Kali Layar in Indonesian) at South Rawa Badak (Rawa Badak Selatan in Indonesian) administrative village in the south.

The zip code of this administrative village is 14230.

== Toponymy and history ==
The name of Rawa Badak possibly derived from Sundanese word rawa badag, which the mean is the wide swamp. In the eastern of Jakarta (the former name is Batavia), when this administrative village lies, were the wide swamp in the early time.

North Rawa Badak is the separation of former Rawa Badak administrative village, according to Governor Decree (Surat Keputusan Gubernur Propinsi Daerah Khusus Ibukota Jakarta) Number 1251 of 1986.
