= Lagoa (North Jakarta) =

Coordinates: 06°06′52″S 106°54′37″E

Lagoa is an administrative village (kelurahan in Indonesian) at Koja subdistrict, North Jakarta. The borders of Lagoa are:

- Cilincing Raya Street at Koja administrative village in the north
- Pinang River (Kali Pinang in Indonesian) in the west
- Kramat Raya Street at Koja administrative village in the east
- Mundu Street and Johar Street in the south

The office of Koja subdistrict is in this administrative village. The zip code of this administrative village is 14270.

== Toponymy ==
The name Lagoa possibly from the folklore about the La Gowa, the descent Bugis (or Mandar) silat master which were stay here in early time. But the name Lagoa comes from the word lagoa which means lake or marsh in Portuguese.
