= Jakarta Islamic Centre =

Islamic studies and research centre

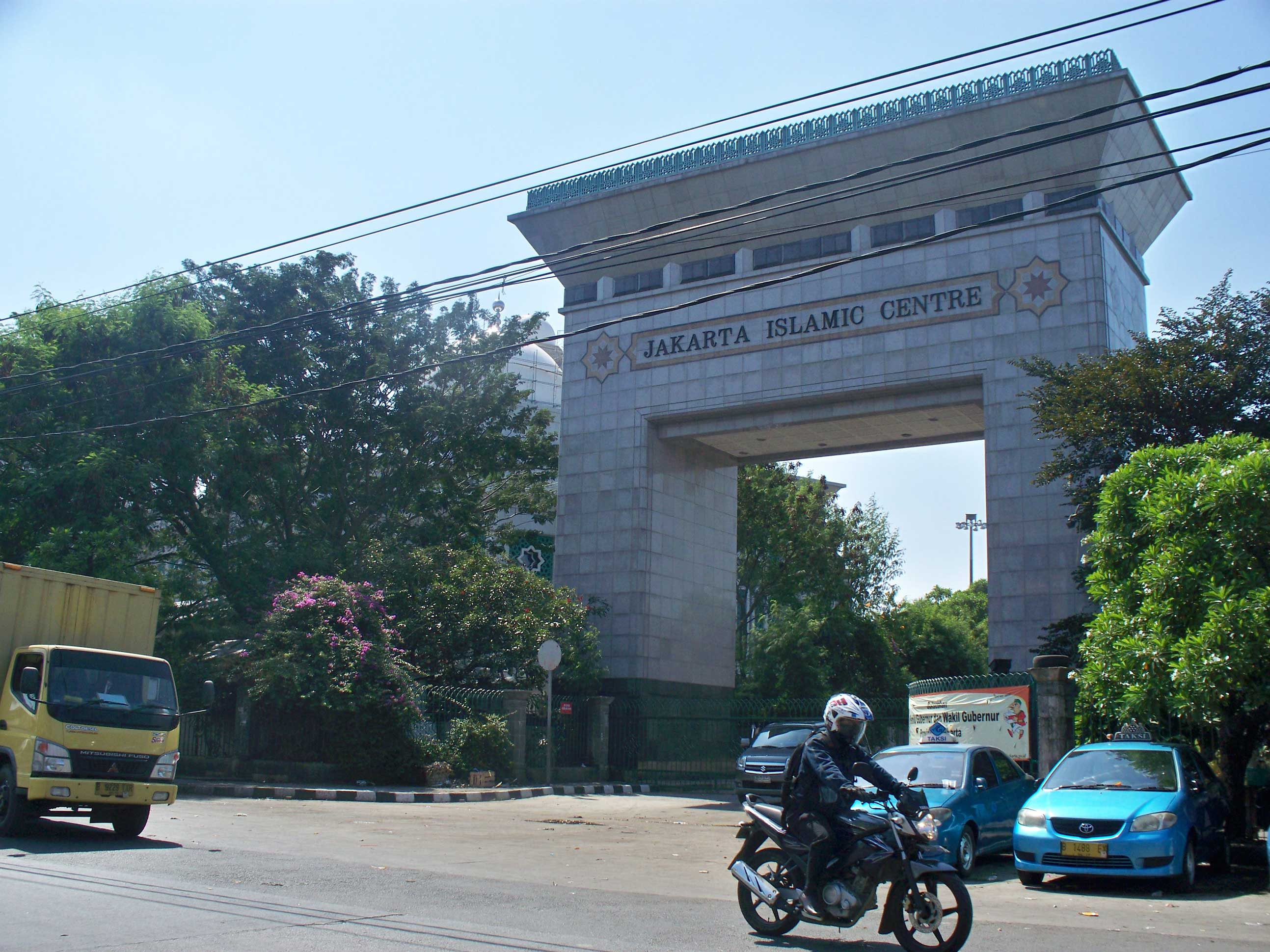
- Main gate of the Jakarta Islamic Centre

- Location within Jakarta Location within West Java Location within Java Location within Indonesia

Religion
- Affiliation: Islam
- Branch/tradition: Sunni
- Province: Jakarta

Location
- Location: North Jakarta
- Country: Indonesia
- Interactive map of Jakarta Islamic Centre
- Coordinates: 6.122601°S 106.917278°E

Architecture
- Type: Mosque
- Style: Ottoman architecture
- Established: 2003; 23 years ago

Specifications
- Dome: 1 main dome (2 secondary domes)
- Minaret: 1

Website
- english.islamic-center.or.id

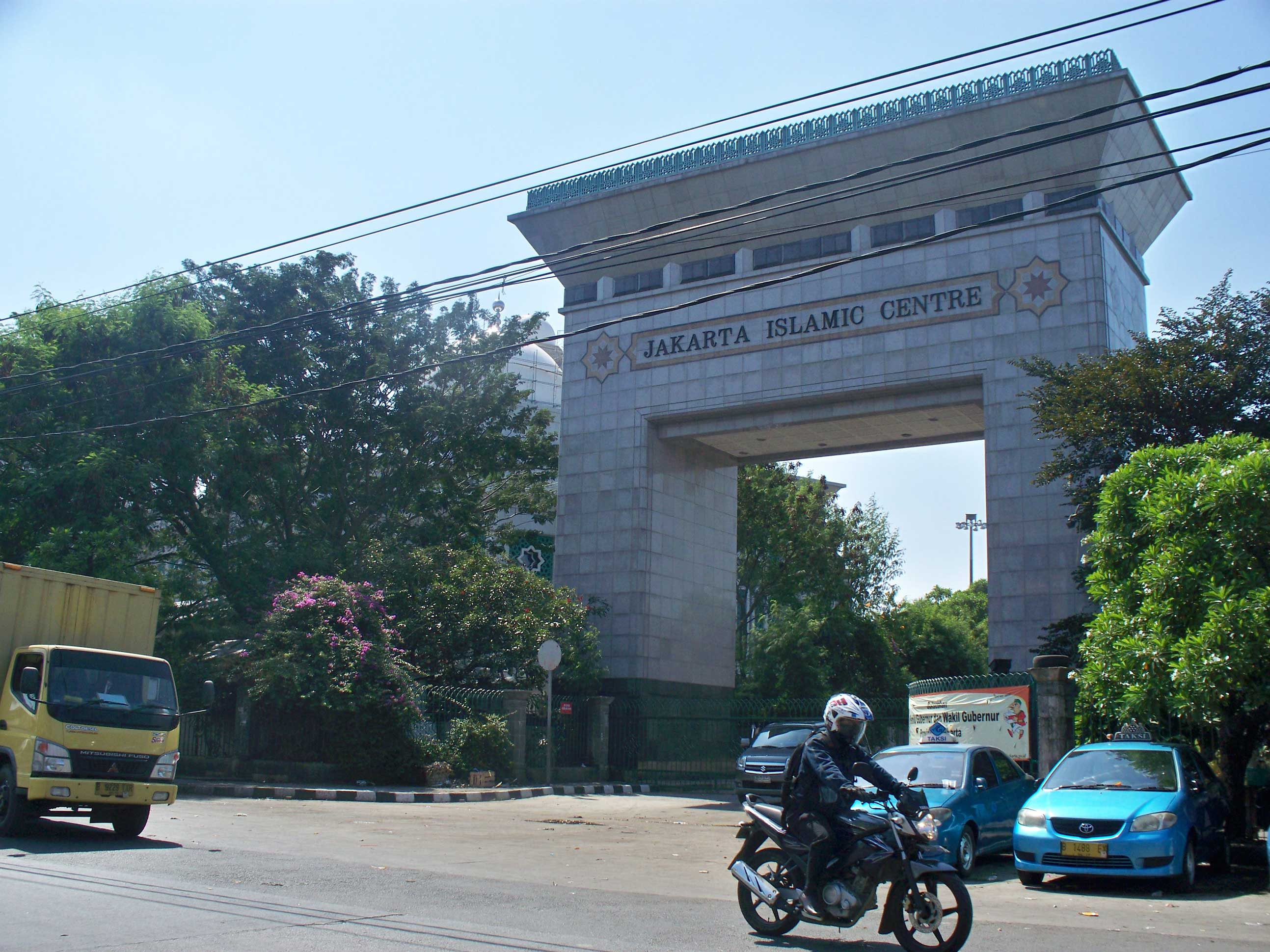

Jakarta Islamic Centre (JIC) is a centre for Islamic studies and research in Koja, Jakarta, Indonesia. Activities of JIC include ZISWAF empowerment, education (TPA, Madrasah, Community Learning Center), socio-economic activities (mosque cooperatives), regular recitations, Tabligh Akbar, and celebrations of Islamic holidays.

== History ==
At the site of JIC, there was a red light district known as Kramat Tunggak, which was established in 1972. Local communities were against the establishment of the red light district and opposed it since its establishment. In 1998, Governor of Jakarta decided to close the red-light district. It was officially closed on 31 December 1999. In 2001, Governor of Jakarta Sutiyoso conducted a brainstorming forum with all elements of society. The idea to build the Jakarta Islamic Center (JIC) was proposed by Sutiyoso to Professor Azyumardi Azra (then the Rector of UIN Syarif Hidayatullah) in New York. The motto of JIC was not only to build a mosque. Their ultimate goal was to transform JIC as one of the central nodes of Islamic civilization in Indonesia and Southeast Asia.

JIC is established on the site of the former red-light district. The site has been opened since 2003. The complex covers a land area of 7 hectares with a 6,000 m^{2} mosque and a place for Islamic learning. Two decrees (99/2003 and 651/2004) by the Governor in 2003 and 2004 formed the organizational and working structure of the center.

== Facilities ==
Aside from being a mosque, JIC is also a center for Islamic religious studies. It is also equipped with educational, business and commercial facilities. The construction of the homestead began in 2007, with a planned land area of 21,452 square meters. The guest house is divided into three buildings, namely the business center with an area of 5,653 square meters, convention hall or meeting hall of 4,582 square meters, and the hotel/guesthouse of 11,217 square meters. There is also an education and training center located within the complex.

== 2022 fire ==
On 19 October 2022 the large dome of the Jami Mosque, belonging to JIC, caught fire and collapsed at around 3:00 p.m. during renovation works, sending thick black smoke into the air. Police confirmed that no one was injured in the incident.
