= Klingalese =

Ethnic group in Indonesia

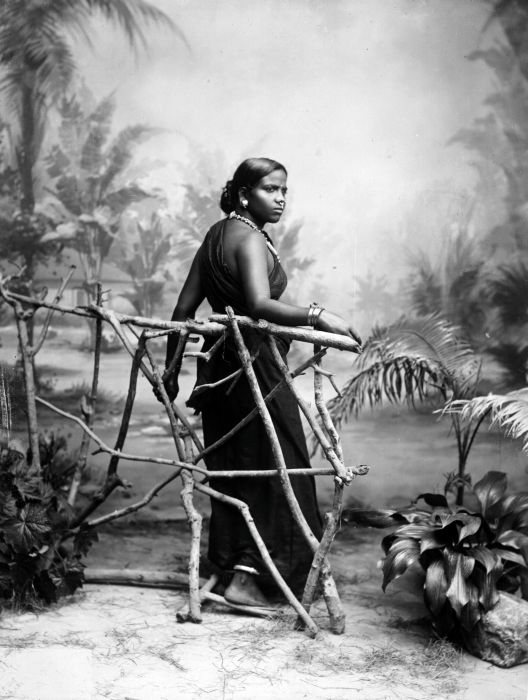
Studio portrait of a Klingalese woman, Stafhell & Kleingrothe (Fotostudio), 1890–1905.

The Klingalese (Malay: Orang Keling; Dutch: Klingalezen or Kodja) referred to an ethnic group in at least Dutch East Indies (Indonesia), Straits Settlements and British India, originating from the Coromandel Coast, Kalinga and the Malabar region. They were predominantly Shiite Muslims and traders. At least at the beginning of the 20th century there was a Klingalese quarter in Padang. In British India, the Klingalese was also used to designate a specific ethnic group, witness antiquarian photography captions, shown here. The Klingalezen was also used in the Dutch East Indies (Indonesia) in a broader sense including other Asian minorities as well.

== Gallery ==
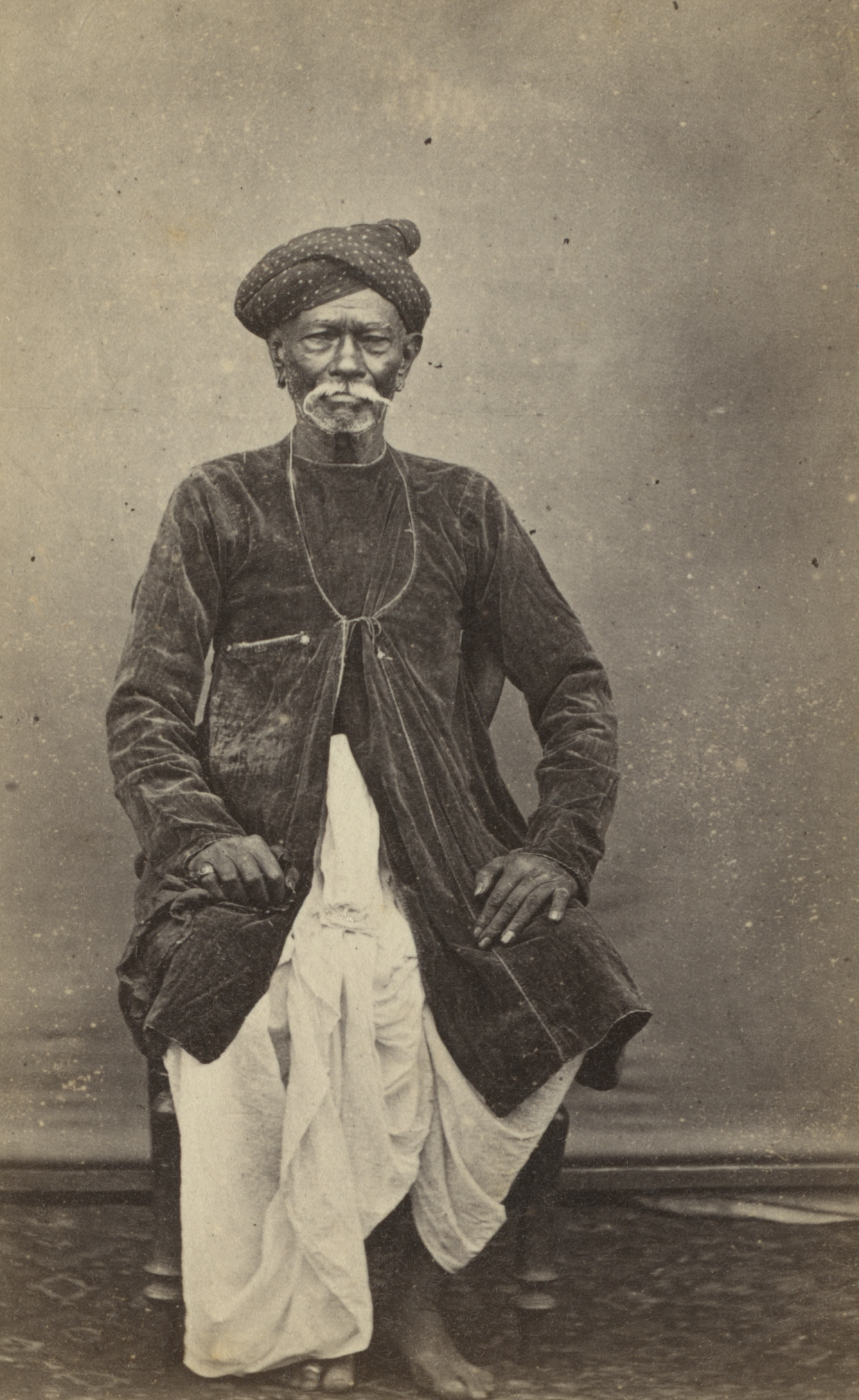
Klingalese man from Madras, India, around 1880

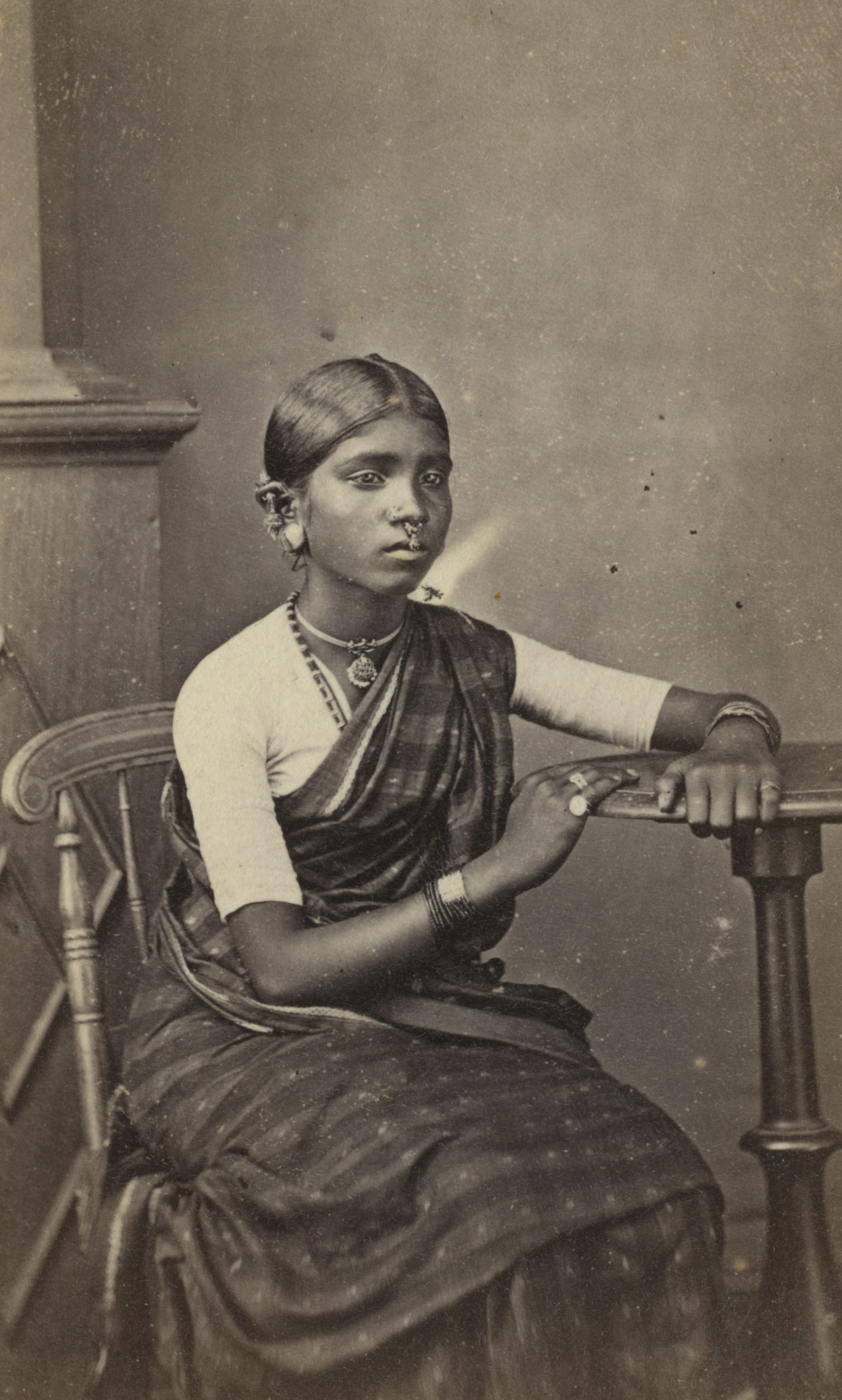
Klingalese woman from Madras, India, around 1880

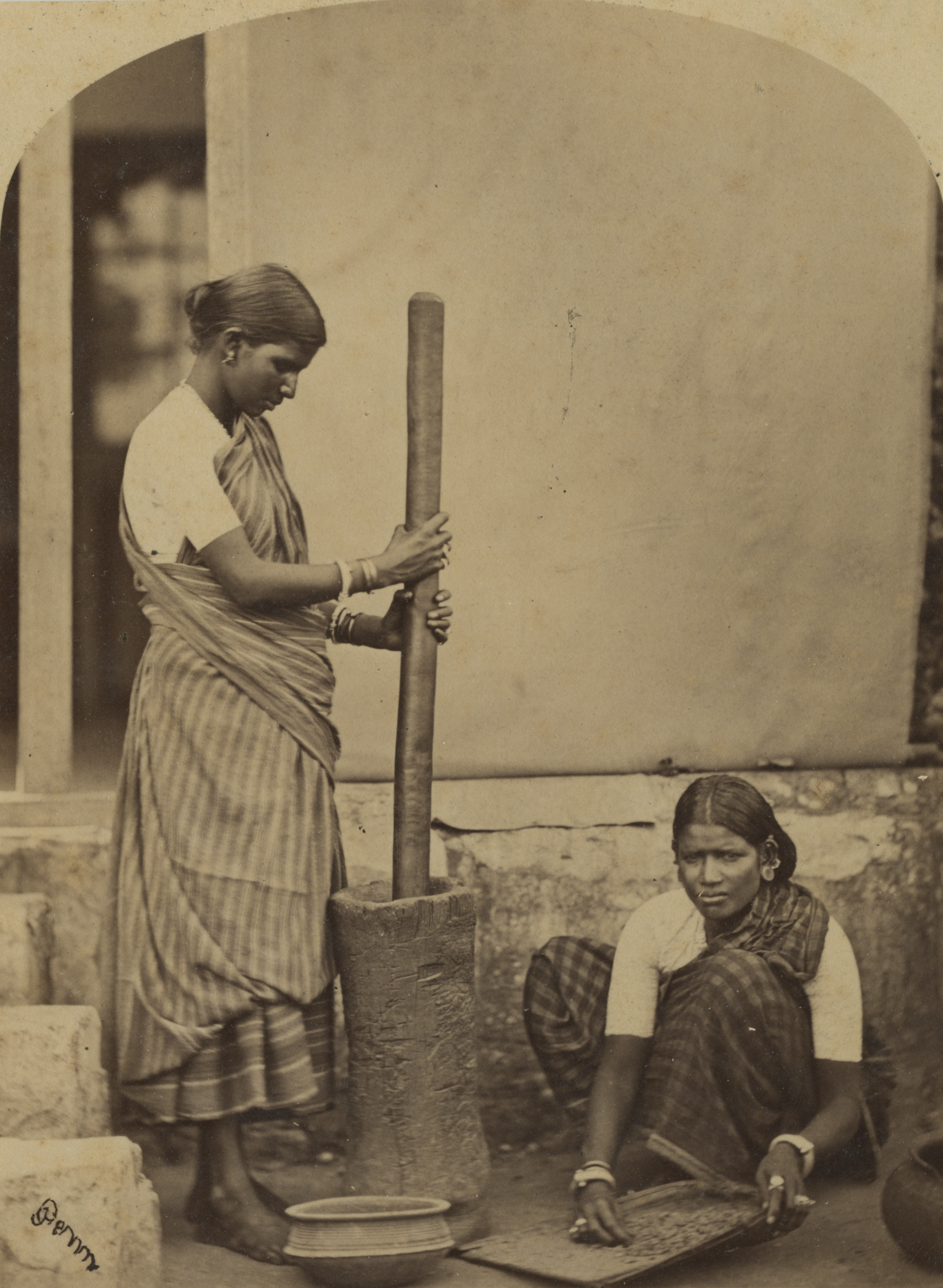
Klingalese women pounding rice in India, around 1890

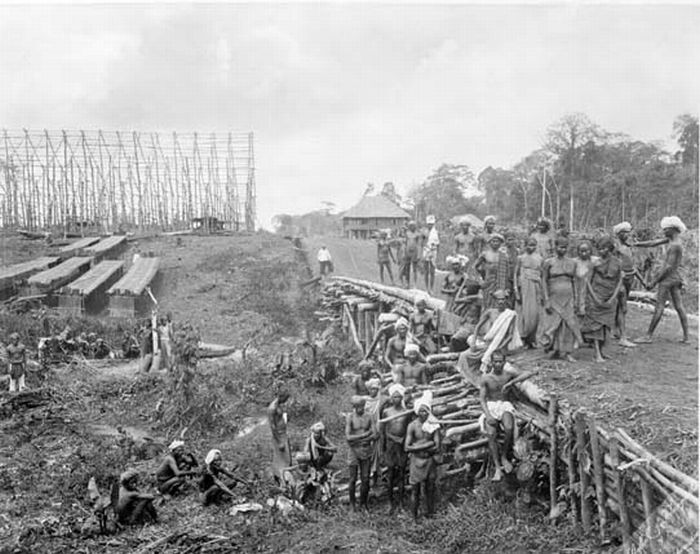
Klingalese coolies constructing a bridge at a tobacco plantation in the Dutch East-Indies (Indonesia), 1898.

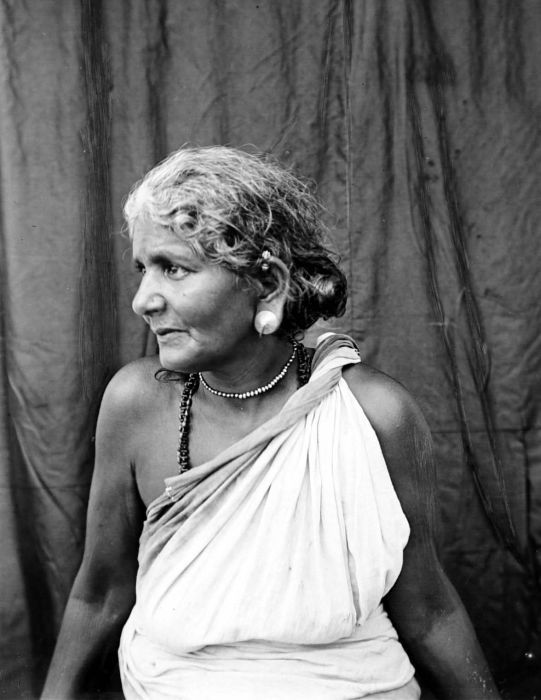
Klingalese woman, east coast of Sumatra.

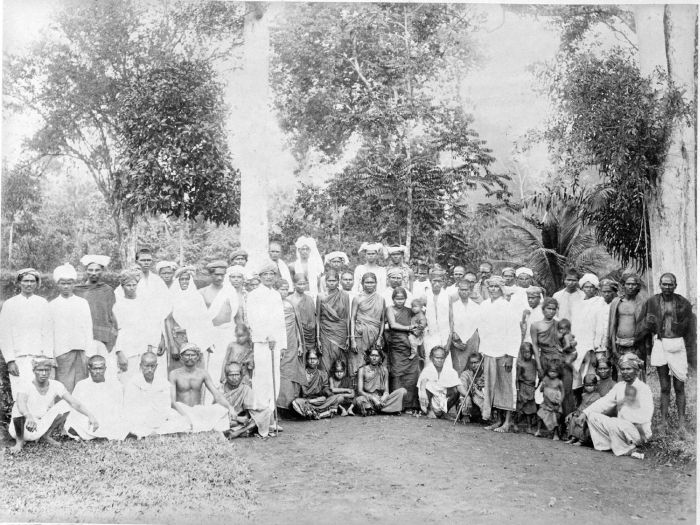
Klingalese coolies with spouses and children, 1885-1895.

== See also ==
- Indian Indonesians
