= Rawa Badak Selatan =

South Rawa Badak (Rawa Badak Selatan in Indonesian) is administrative village (kelurahan in Indonesian) at Koja subdistrict, North Jakarta.

The zip code of this administrative village is 14230.

== Toponymy and history ==
The name of Rawa Badak possibly derived from Sundanese word rawa badag, which the mean is the wide swamp. In the eastern of Jakarta (the former name is Batavia), when this administrative village lies, were the wide swamp in the early time.

South Rawa Badak is the separation of former Rawa Badak administrative village, according to Governor Decree (Surat Keputusan Gubernur Propinsi Daerah Khusus Ibukota Jakarta) Number 1251 of 1986.
