= Mardijker Creole =

Extinct Portuguese-based creole of Jakarta

Mardijker
- Batavian Creole Portuguese, Tugunese
- Papiá Tugu
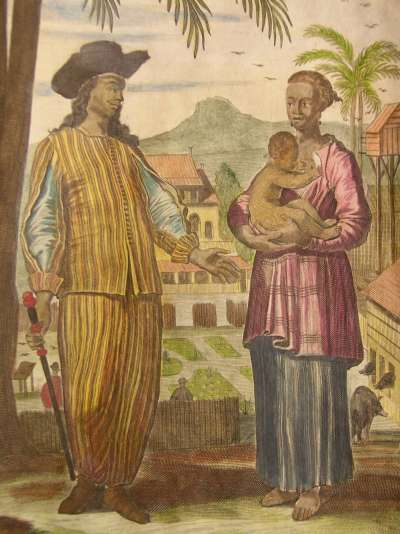
- Mardijkers in 1704 and in the background, presumably the land granted to them outside Batavia, now Kampung Tugu. The building is possibly the original Tugu Church.
- Native to: Indonesia
- Region: Jakarta
- Ethnicity: Mardijker people
- Extinct: 2012, with the death of Mimi Abrahams
- Language family: Portuguese-based creole languages: Indo-Portuguese creoles; Malaccan–Batavia Creole; Mardijker

Language codes
- ISO 639-3: tvg
- Glottolog: None mala1533 (covered by Malacca–Batavia Creole)
- Linguasphere: 51-AAC-ahd
- IETF: idb-u-sd-idjk

Mardijker Creole, also called Tugunese and Batavian Creole, was a Portuguese-based creole of Jakarta. It was the native tongue of the Mardijker people. The language was introduced with the establishment of the Dutch settlement of Batavia (present-day Jakarta); the Dutch brought in slaves from the colonies they had recently acquired from the Portuguese (especially Malacca), and the slaves' Portuguese creole became the lingua franca of the new city. The name is Dutch for "freeman", as the slaves were freed soon after their settlement. The language was replaced by Betawi creole Malay in Batavia by the end of the 18th century, as the Mardijker intermarried and lost their distinct identity. However, around 1670 a group of 150 were moved to what is now the village and suburb of Tugu, where they continued to speak an offshoot of the language, there known as Tugu Creole, until the 1940s.

The earliest known record of the language is documented in a wordlist published in Batavia in 1780, the Nieuwe Woordenschat. The last competent speaker, Oma Mimi Abrahams, died in 2012, and the language survives only in the lyrics of old Keroncong Moresco (Keroncong Tugu) songs.

== Phonology ==
Consonants
		Bilabial	Labio-Dental	Dental/ Alveolar	Alveo-Palatal	Palatal	Velar
Plosive	Voiced	b		d			g
Plosive	Unvoiced	p		t			k
Nasal		m		n	ɲ		ŋ
Tap/Trill				r			
Fricative	Voiced		v				
Fricative	Unvoiced		f	s			
Affricate	Voiced				ʤ		
Affricate	Unvoiced				ʧ		
Lateral				l	ʎ		
Glide		w				j	

Vowels
	Front	Central	Back
Close	i		u
Mid	e		o
Open		a	

== Bibliography ==
- Nieuwe Woordenschatm uyt het Niederduitsch in her Maleedsch en Portugeesch, zeer gemakkelyk voor de errst op Batavia komen. Batavia: Lodewyk Dominicus. 1780.
- Maurer, Philippe (2011). The Former Portuguese Creole of Batavia and Tugu (Indonesia). London: Battlebridge Publications.
- Suratminto, Lilie (2011). "Creol Potuguese of the Tugu Village: Colonial Heritage in Jakarta Based on the Historical and Linguistic Review". Tawarikh. 3 (1). doi:10.2121/tawarikh.v3i1.393 (inactive 12 July 2025).
- Suratminto, Lilie (2014). "Bahasa Tugu: Bahasa Kreol Yang Punah" [Bahasa Tugu: The Extinct Creole]. Jurnal Melayu (in Malay). 13: 85–100.
- Schuchardt, Hugo (1891), "Kreolische Studien IX. Uber das Malaioportugiesische von Batavia und Tugu", Sitzungsberichte der philosophisch-historischen Classe der Kaiserlichen Akademie der Wissenschaften, vol. 122, Wien, pp. 1–256

== Relevant literature ==
- Baxter, Alan N. "The former Portuguese Creole of Batavia and Tugu (Indonesia). By Philippe Maurer." Journal of Pidgin and Creole Languages 30, no. 2 (2015): 379-384.
- Suratminto, Lilie. "Creol Potuguese of the Tugu Village: Colonial Heritage in Jakarta based on the historical and linguistic review." TAWARIKH 3, no. 1 (2011).
- Suratminto, Lilie. "Bahasa Tugu: Bahasa Kreol yang Punah." Jurnal Melayu 13 (2014): 85-100.
- Taufiqurrahman, Febri. "Vocabulary of The Extinct Tugu Portuguese Creole Dialect Used by The Portuguese Descendants In Tugu Village, North Jakarta." Jurnal Pembahsi (Pembelajaran Bahasa Dan Sastra Indonesia) 13, no. 2 (2023): 226-240.
