= Cilincing =

Neighborhood in Jakarta, Indonesia

Coordinates: 6°08′S 106°57′E

- District
- Kecamatan Cilincing
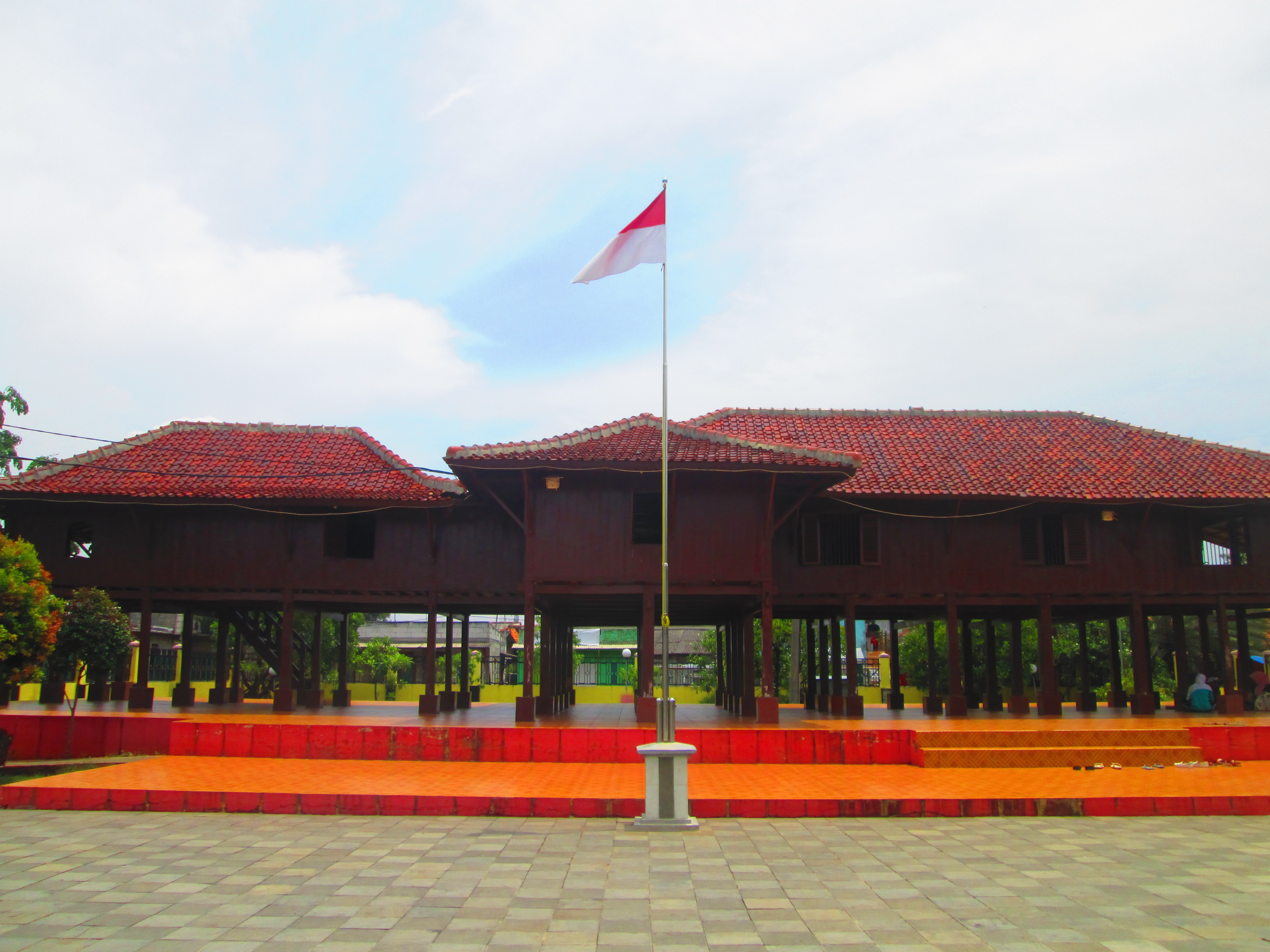
- Rumah si Pitung, a historical house in Cilincing.
- Interactive map of Cilincing
- Country: Indonesia
- Province: Special Capital City District of Jakarta
- City: North Jakarta

Area
  - Total: 37.70 km^{2} (14.56 sq mi)

Population (mid 2023)
  - Total: 440,640
  - Density: 11,690/km^{2} (30,270/sq mi)
- Postal code: 141XX

Cilincing is a historic neighborhood and administrative district (kecamatan) on the coast of North Jakarta Administrative City, Indonesia. It is sandwiched between the Port of Tanjung Priok to the west and River Titram to the east. Cilincing has been for some decades one of the districts of North Jakarta which in turn encompasses as far as Marunda and some non-coastal hinterland.

The name Cilincing is likely derived from the name of the river Ci Lincing, the local river that flows to its northern mouth. Ci is a Sundanese word for "river", while Lincing is the name for the plant carambola.

== Government ==
As a district (Indonesian: kecamatan), it is much larger than the historic guise, and includes the coastal neighborhood of Marunda and the more inland neighborhood of Tugu. Cilincing District is the most northeastern district of Jakarta. Much of it is allotted for agriculture and industry. The Cakung Drain, part of Jakarta's flood canal, flows through the district into Jakarta Bay.

Cilincing District is divided into seven Administrative Villages (kelurahan):

Name	Area/postal code
Kali Baru	14110
Cilincing	14120
Semper Barat	14130
Semper Timur	14130
Sukapura	14140
Rorotan	14140
Marunda	14150

== History ==
=== Early development ===
During the early colonial period, Cilincing (older spelling Tji Lintjing) was a name of a coastal area located around 7 km east of the cape of Priok (Malay Tanjong Priok). The land of Cilincing were dotted with fish ponds, similar with Ancol but less marshy, allowing early settlements to grow. The coast of Cilincing contained a shell-rich beach and among few places in Java which contains the species of cemara laut ("sea pine").

In late 18th-century, four manor houses (landhuizen) were established by the Dutch, from west to east: Tanjong Priok house belonging to De heer van Riemsdyk, Pajonkoran house (also Jonkoraan) to Richold ter Schegget, Bangliauw house (variously written as Bangleu or Bank Loeau) to Paul Bergman, and the easternmost and the most imposing of all Cilincing mansion belonging to Johannes Christoffel Schultz. These mansions were connected to the walled city of Batavia through the Vaart canal (possibly a pre-Dutch canal) and then to Ancol canal, which was then connected to the outer canal of the walled city of Batavia.

The Cilincing mansion, located roughly in what is now the kecamatan office of Cilincing District, was the administration center of the early settlements in Cilincing. A Tuesday market was established to the north of Cilincing mansion. The mansion was strategically located, being the point where the traffic from the Vaart canal connects with the road to the plantation area to the south. One of the settlement of the southern plantation is the Portuguese Tugu settlement, among the oldest settlement in Jakarta.

=== Seaside resorts of Cilincing (19th-century – 1970s) ===
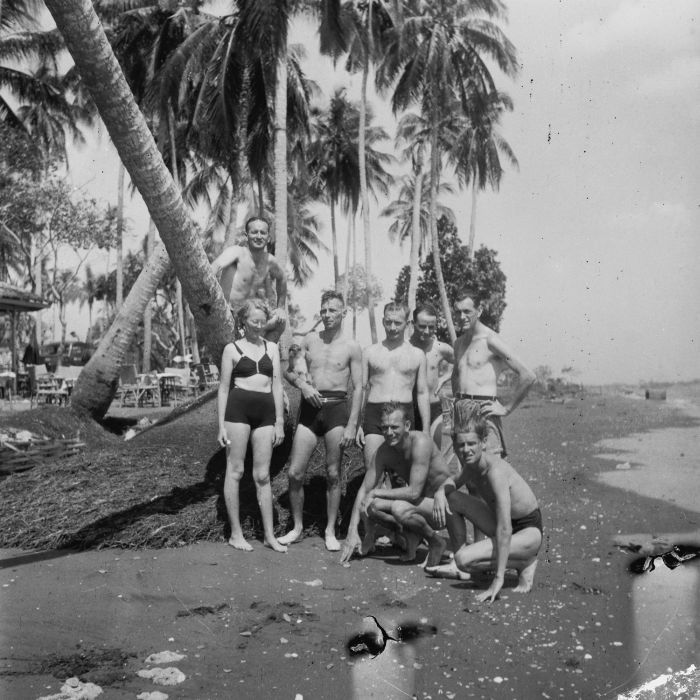
Palm Beach Cilincing in the 1940s, a popular beach area in Cilincing. The beach no longer exist.

Beginning in the late 19th-century, the seaside area of Cilincing started to become a popular seaside recreation area. Dutch people and natives alike flocked to the seaside of Cilincing to enjoy the pristine water or to have a picnic. One popular resort was the Palm Beach Cilincing which was supported with recreational facilities such as eating places and bathing areas.

The popularity of Cilincing as a seaside resort continued to the 20th-century. Another popular seaside resort of Cilincing in the 1950s was the Sindang Laut on the western edge of Cilincing near the Port of Tanjung Priok. Sindang Laut was equipped with restaurant, playground, and berths for small boats. Sindang Laut has been demolished, the area converted into industrial port area, and is now Bogasari Flour Mills.

=== Industrial and slum area (post 1980s) ===
Cilincing and its surrounding area continued its popularity as seaside resort until the 1970s. The beginning of the 1980s saw the decline of Cilincing's popularity, mainly caused by the expansion of the Port of Tanjung Priok plus increasing pollution along the north coast of Java. The success of the reclamation of the seaside part of Ancol into Ancol Dreamland resort in 1962 prompted President Suharto to start another reclamation project, the Pantai Mutiara and the Pantai Indah Kapuk project; the land fill for Pantai Indah Kapuk project was dredged from Palm Beach Cilincing. With the shift of Jakarta's seaside resort toward Ancol, Pantai Indah Kapuk, and Pantai Mutiara, Cilincing as seaside resort effectively ended.

By the late 1990s, Cilincing had become industrialized and had become a garbage-strewn slum. What used to be the attractive Palm Beach Cilincing is now an unattractive ship scrapyard, surrounded with slum. The area remain underdeveloped to present time.

Much of Cilincing's coastal areas are occupied by fish processing industries, resulting in a large amount of organic waste. Among them are large piles of clamshells produced by green mussel processing which had piled up to 5 meters high across a 500-meter stretch of beach.

== Marunda Dam ==
Based on DKI Jakarta Governor Rule Number 77 Year 2009, 56 hectares of Marunda Dam will be built plus 12 hectares of Integrated Waste Management, 5.8 hectares of Asphalt Mixing Plant, 43.3 hectares of Public Green Designation and 29.9 hectares of Facilities and Infrastructure for Supporting Operational Functions of the East Flood Canal (Kanal Banjir Timur) or totally 147 hectares project. Marunda Dam will be initially built in 2012.

== List of important places ==
Below are list of important places in the district of Cilincing.

- Al Alam Mosque, also known as Si Pitung Mosque, a wooden mosque built in the early 18th century.
- Aulia Marunda Mosque, built in the 17th century.
- The grave of Captain Tete Jonker
- Kalibaru Port
- Kampung Marunda
- Langgar Tinggi or Rumah Si Pitung (Si Pitung Residence), a red wooden stilt house built in the 20th century. This bugis-style house is believed by locals as the house where Si Pitung, a Betawi legendary hero, commit burglary. A new bridge accommodating cars is being built for ease directly visit Si Pitung Residence.
- Rawa Malang City Forest, a 5 hectares area in Semper Timur Administrative Village which is occupied mostly by Trembesi trees.
- Marunda Port

== See also ==
- Batavia, Dutch East Indies

== Cited works ==
- Backer, C.A. (2012). The Problem of Krakatao as Seen by a Botanist. Springer Science & Business Media. ISBN 9789401531733.
- Merrillees, Scott (2015). Jakarta: Portraits of a Capital 1950–1980. Jakarta: Equinox Publishing. ISBN 9786028397308.
- Kaart van Batavia en Omstreken [Map of Batavia and Surrounding] (Map) (Batavia ed.). 1:20000 (in Dutch). Cartography by Topografische Bureau. 1897. Archived from the original on August 18, 2016.
- van Geemen, Pieter (1792). Verhandelingen van het Koninklijk Bataviaasch Genootschap van Kunsten en Wetenschappen, Volume 6. Bataviaasch Genootschap van Kunsten en Wetenschappen.
