= Tugu Church =

Protestant church in Indonesia

- Tugu Church
- 6.123916°S 106.924025°E
- Location: Jakarta
- Country: Indonesia
- Denomination: Protestant

History
- Dedicated: 29 July 1747

Architecture
- Functional status: Active
- Style: Dutch-Portuguese

Administration
- Parish: Kampung Tugu

Tugu Church (Indonesian: Gereja Tugu), is a Protestant church in Kampung Kurus (Kampung Kecil), Semper Barat Administrative Village, Cilincing, Jakarta, Indonesia. The church was located in Kampung Tugu, a village of Mardijker people, a Creole Portuguese community. It is the second oldest church in Jakarta, after Sion Church.

== History ==
On July 21, 1647, a portion of a land was donated by Justinus van der Vinck, owner of the lands around Cilincing and Pasar Senen at that time. Over this land, the first Tugu Church was constructed in 1678. In 1737, Pastor Van der Tydt restored the building, but in 1740, this church was burned by the Chinese during an uprising. A second church was constructed between 1744 and 1747, the church that exist today, by Pastor Mohr. The church was ordained on July 29, 1747, under the permission of Governor General Van Imhoff.

== Architecture ==
Tugu church was built in a modest style. The style can be described as a fusion between 18th century Dutch architecture and Portuguese Church. Although the church building has undergone several renovations, original parts still remain, including the baptismal pool. It contains several antique deacon bench, metal plates and the old pulpit. The bell tower dates from 1880, but the old bell was broken (from 1747) and stored in the vicarage. The Tugu Church complex also accommodates a home for the elderly, a cemetery and a high school.

== See also ==
- List of church buildings in Indonesia
