= Mardijker people =

Ethnic group in Indonesia

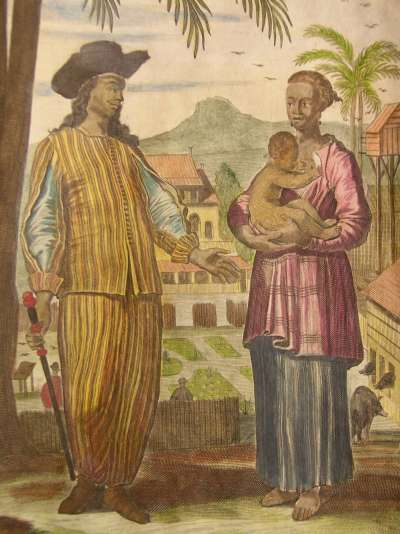
- A Mardijker family

Regions with significant populations
- Indonesia (Jakarta)

Languages
- Predominantly; Betawi • Indonesian • Mardijker Creole (historical); Also; Malay • Portuguese

Religion
- Christianity

Related ethnic groups
- Belanda Hitam • Klingalese • Betawi • Indo • African Indonesian • Indian Indonesian • Portuguese Indonesian

The Mardijker people refer to an ethnic community in the Dutch East Indies (present-day Indonesia) made up of descendants of freed slaves who spoke or were culturally Portuguese. They could be found at all major trading posts in the East Indies. They were mostly Christian, of various ethnicities from conquered Portuguese and Spanish territories. Some are of European ethnicity, while some others are natives from various Portuguese-controlled territories. They spoke Mardijker Creole, a Portuguese-based creole, which has influenced the modern Indonesian language.

== Origin ==
The ancestors of the Mardijkers had been mostly made up of slaves of the Portuguese in India, Africa, and the Malay Peninsula, with a minority being European (usually Portuguese) prisoners of war that were brought to Indonesia by the Dutch East India Company (VOC), especially after the 1641 Dutch conquest of Malacca, whereby Portuguese speakers in the city were taken as captive. Some were also Christian slaves captured by Moro raiders from the Philippines and sold in slave markets in Batavia during the height of the Spanish–Moro conflict and the Sulu Sea piracy. In the Spanish Philippines, they were called "Mardica", as recorded in the Murillo Velarde Map.

The term Mardijker is a Dutch corruption of the Malay word Merdeka, which originates from the Sanskrit Maharddhika meaning "rich, prosperous, and powerful". In the Malay archipelago, this term had acquired the meaning of a freed slave, and now means "independent".

The Mardijkers mostly held on to their Catholic faith and continued to attend Batavia's Portuguese church, although many were eventually baptised by the Dutch Reformed Church. They were legally recognized by the VOC as a separate ethnic group and kept themselves apart from the native Javanese.

During the VOC era, there was already considerable intermarriage with the Indos in pre-colonial history, who were often also of Portuguese descent. During the colonial era, the Mardijkers eventually assimilated completely into the Eurasian Indo community and were no longer registered as a separate ethnic group.

== Transition ==
Between the 18th and 19th centuries, the Mardijkers exchanged their Portuguese-based creole for the Betawi language.

A part of Jakarta is called "Kampung Tugu" an area where Mardijker people had been allowed to settle for after their freedom, the neighborhood retains its Portuguese distinctiveness. Historically these people also settled in Old Batavia's Roa Malacca district near Kali Besar; however, little historic buildings remain of what had been the historic quarter.

Common Mardijker family names are De Fretes, Ferrera, De Mello, Gomes, Gonsalvo, Cordero, De Dias, De Costa, Soares, Rodrigo, De Pinto, Perreira, and De Silva. Some Mardijker families also took Dutch names such as Willems, Michiels, Bastiaans, Pieters, Jansz, Fransz, and Davidts.

When the Indonesians fought for independence from the Dutch they used the slogan Merdeka ("freedom"), which has the same root as Mardijker. This word had considerable political significance also in Malaysia and Singapore. The term Mardijkers is also used for the so-called Belanda Hitam, soldiers recruited in the Dutch Gold Coast who served in the Dutch East Indies Army and gained their freedom afterward.

== See also ==
- Kampung Tugu
- Mardijker Creole language
- African Indonesians
- Betawi people
- Belanda Hitam
- Indian Indonesians
- Indo people
- Klingalese
- Portuguese Indonesians
