= Kampung Tugu =

Subdistrict of Koja, North Jakarta, Java

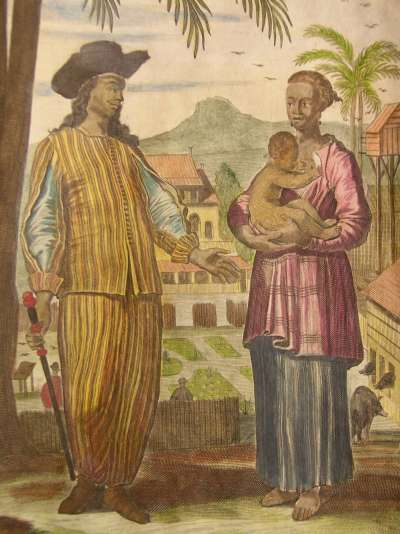
The Mardijkers and in the background, presumably the land granted to them outside Batavia, now Kampung Tugu. The building is possibly the original Tugu Church.

Kampung Tugu is a historical neighborhood located in northwestern Jakarta on the island of Java. Kampung Tugu grew from the land granted by the government of the Dutch East Indies to the converted Mardijker people in the 17th century. From this land, a Christian settlement grew and developed its own culture. Kampung Tugu is one of the oldest Christian neighborhoods in the western part of Indonesia. Today, the Christian neighborhood of Kampung Tugu is part of the Administrative Village of Tugu in Koja Subdistrict of North Jakarta, Indonesia.

== History ==
The Mardijkers had been brought to Batavia as slaves or indentured labor after the Dutch East India Company (VOC) captured Malacca and Galle from the Portuguese in 1640. The presence of Christian slaves in Batavia became an ethical dilemma for the Dutch Reform Church and in 1661 they were freed and granted land outside Batavia on the condition that they convert from Catholicism to Protestantism. This very land, located 10 kilometers east of Old Batavia, was the land given for the freed Mardijkers. This land would develop into the Kampung Tugu.

Before the Mardijkers were freed, most of them married to women from Banda Islands and settled in a neighborhood in Jakarta now known as Kampung Bandan. In 1661, following the order of the Dutch East India Company (VOC), 23 families of Portuguese were transferred to Tugu. The place was named Tugu because it was the location of the city boundary (which was marked by a tugu, Javanese word for "stone shaft"), or some said after the Portuguese themselves. Kampung Tugu is the oldest Christian neighborhood in the west of Indonesia.

In 1999, Kampung Tugu was recognized by the Indonesian government as a cultural heritage. Today, the 17th-century-established Tugu Church is the oldest building in Kampung Tugu, thought to be one of the first building to be built by the community between 1676 and 1678, and is still well maintained by the community.

== Culture ==
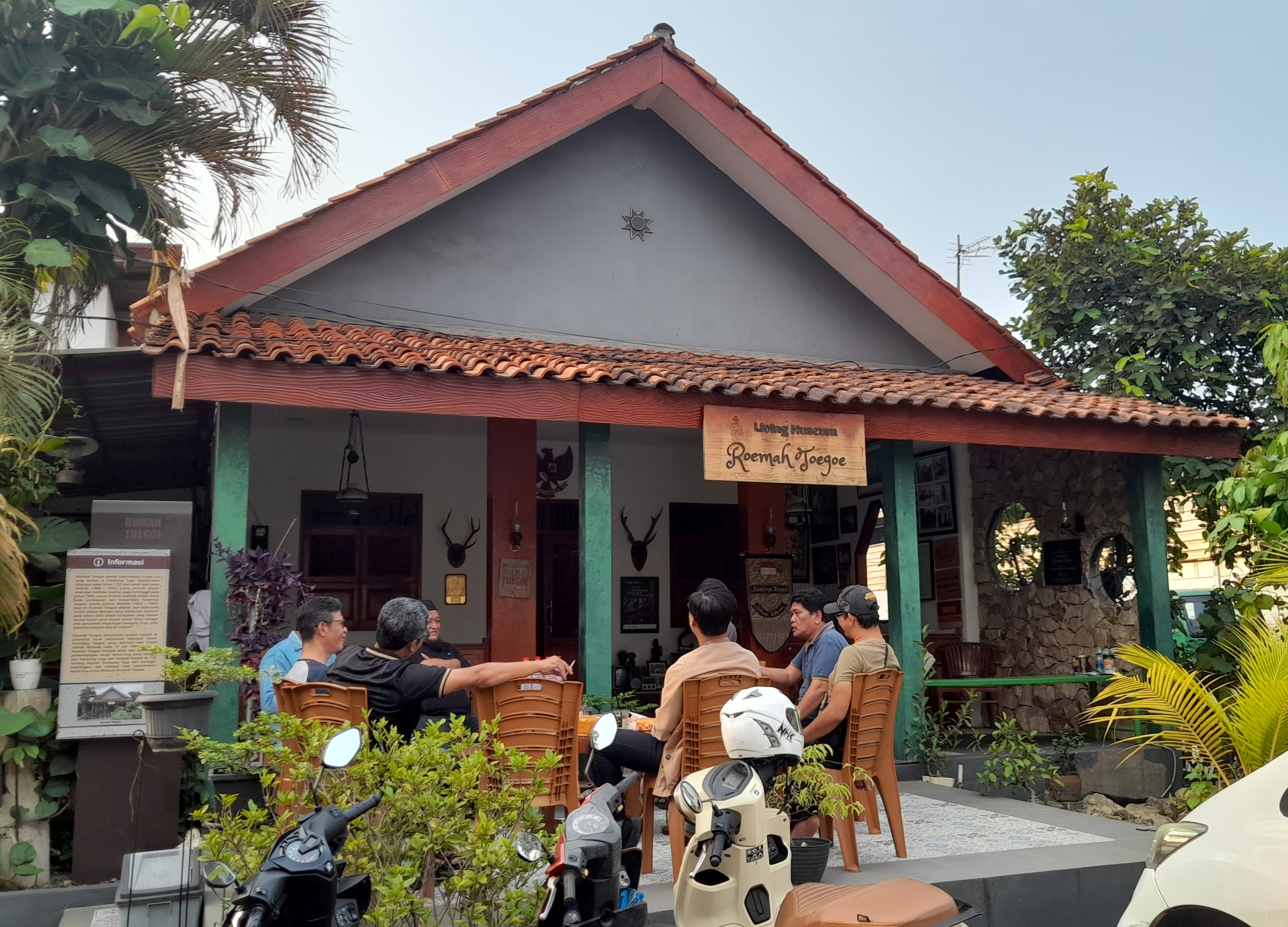
Roemah Toegoe, a surviving house in Kampung Tugu

Kampung Tugu neighborhood still exists and retains its own distinct Christian-Portuguese culture, e.g. the Portuguese-influenced musical style Kroncong Tugu spoken in the extinct Papia Tugu language. One of the reasons of their well-preserved distinct culture is because Kampung Tugu was relatively isolated from the hustle and bustle of Batavia for nearly 300 years.

The people of Kampung Tugu are a mix of Portuguese and natives. Last names like Andries, Cornelis, Abraham, Michel, Quiko, and Browne can still be found in the enclave of Kampung Tugu. At early times, descendants of the Mardijkers could be found as far as Simpang Lima neighborhood about 500 meter west of Kampung Tugu, still within the Cakung River. Today, however, people of actual Portuguese mix can only be found around Kampung Tugu and Kampung Kurus.

The people of Kampung Tugu are locally known as warga tugu or warga serani by the majority of Muslims in the surrounding. The word serani came from nasrani, an Arabic term for Christians. In the past, Tugu people still spoke a creole language of local and Portuguese language. This creole culture has dwindled following the repatriation of the Dutch where many of the original Tugu people also moved to the Netherlands, or other places.

Before the industrialization of the area, the people of Kampung Tugu cultivated rice and coconuts, and hunt for boars which were made into dendeng (jerkies) known as dendeng tugu ("Tugu jerkies"), which was known for their high quality. Tugu people were also fishermen, being closely located to Cakung River and the sea. Known local food from the neighborhood are dendeng tugu, gado-gado Tugu (a variant of gado-gado with a distinctive sauce), pindang serani bandeng, lopis ketan, kue pisang udang, and sop snert kacang hijau.

Today, few original houses in Kampung Tugu remain. Many of the original wooden houses in Kampung Tugu date from the 19th-century and feature distinctive features such as an open front terrace to welcome guests, typically surrounded with potted plants, and a traditional stone furnace in the kitchen. In the 1980s, only 50 of the original Tugu families were left in Kampung Tugu. The original houses declined as the area surrounding Tugu was slowly transformed into industrial storage area thanks to the lack of planning of the city of Jakarta.

Below are distinctive traditions of the Tugu community:

=== Kroncong Tugu ===
Keroncong Tugu, also known as keroncong Moresco, is a type of kroncong typical of Tugu. The kroncong Tugu is played during wedding ceremonies, New Year festivals, and funeral processions. Among the well-known kroncong Tugu musicians are Fernando Quiko and Jacobus Quiko.

=== Rabo-rabo ===
Rabo-rabo is an annual event of Kampung Tugu that is held to celebrate Christmas and the New Year. The term is derived from the Portuguese word rabo, meaning "to tail" or "to follow". After a church service and a pilgrimage to the family tomb, residents will gather back to the church and then visit all the houses around the neighborhood while playing keroncong songs and forgive each other. According to Erni L. Michiels, chairman of the Tugu Family Association, the purpose of holding Rabo-rabo is to strengthen the ropes of brotherhood among the citizens.

=== Mandi-Mandi ===
Mandi-Mandi is another tradition distinctive of Kampung Tugu. The mandi-mandi tradition is to smear people's face with powder, beginning with the oldest. The mandi-mandi tradition of 2017 was attended by the president of East Timor, Xanana Gusmão.

== Sources ==
- Beukhof, J. (1890). Eene Verwaarloosde Zuster: Aanteekeningen omtrent het verleden van de kleine Christen-gemeente te Toegoe [A Neglected Sister: Notes on the Past of the Small Christian Congregation in Tugu] (in Dutch). Leiden: D. Donner – via Utrecht University Repository.
- Burnet, Ian (2015). Archipelago: A Journey Across Indonesia. Rosenberg Publishing. ISBN 9781925078718.
- "Gado-gado Tak Pernah Ketinggalan Pada Pesta di Tugu" [Gado-gado was never left in Tuguese feast]. Selera (in Indonesian). Vol. 3, no. 12. Jakarta: Yayasan Sarana Vida. December 1983.
- Suratminto, Lilie (2011). "Creol Portuguese of the Tugu Village". International Journal for Historical Studies. 3 (1).
- Tan, Raan-Hann (2016). Por-Tugu-Ese? The protestant Tugu community of Jakarta, Indonesia (PhD thesis). ISCTE – University Institute of Lisbon. hdl:10071/11540.
