= Theo Becking =

Dutch military officer and fascist politician

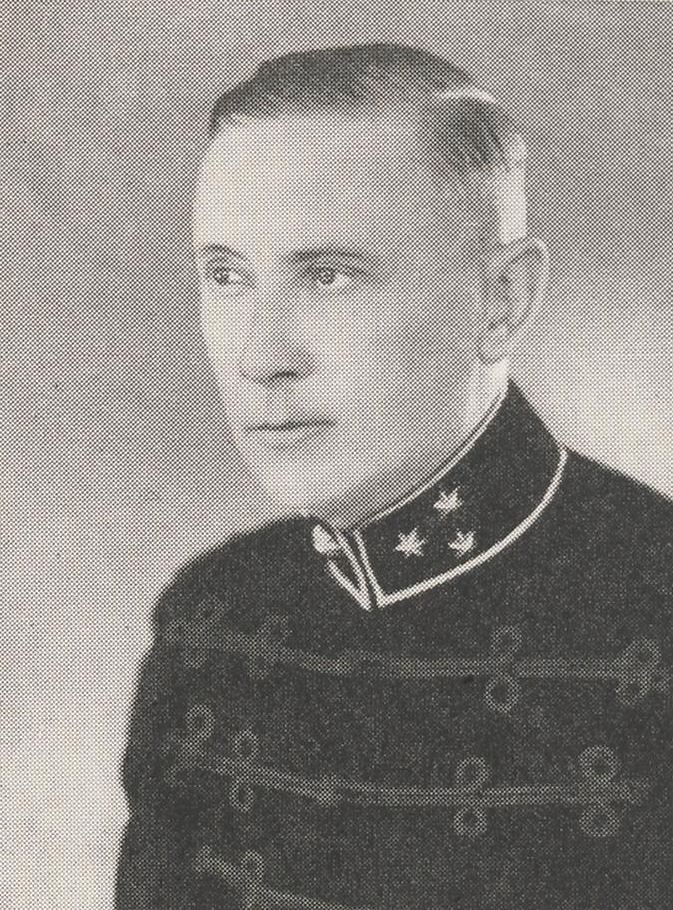
- Born: Laurens Theodorus Becking; 4 November 1887; Mojokerto, Dutch East Indies
- Died: 1945 (aged 57–58); Paramaribo
- Occupation: military officer

Laurens Theodorus "Theo" Becking (1887–1945) was an officer in the Royal Netherlands East Indies Army. He was a key figure in the repression of the unsuccessful 1926 Communist Party of Indonesia uprising in Java and Sumatra. He planned and oversaw the construction of the Boven-Digoel concentration camp in New Guinea where many Communist Party members were exiled, and was its first administrator. During the 1930s, he was a prominent member of the fascist Nationaal-Socialistische Beweging and briefly became its leader in the Indies in 1939; because of that association, he was detained during the Second World War and eventually deported with NSB members to Jodensavanne internment camp in Surinam, where he died.

== Biography ==
=== Early life ===
Becking was born in Mojokerto, Java, Dutch East Indies on 4 November 1887. His father, Salomon Wessel Becking, was a civil engineer born in Varsseveld, and his mother Johanna Maria (née Rijkens) was born in Surabaya. His brother Johannes Hendrikus Becking would later become a well-known botanist and forester.

In around 1900, he was sent to Europe to attend school; he enrolled in a Hogere Burgerschool in Breda, finishing in 1907, and then in 1908 joined the Koninklijke Militaire Academie in Breda, graduating in 1910. He joined the Royal Netherlands East Indies Army (KNIL) and was originally posted as second infantry Lieutenant in the colonial reserve at Nijmegen, and left for the Indies in July 1911.

=== Military career ===
Becking served in various parts of the Indies over the next decade and a half, and was promoted to first infantry Lieutenant and eventually to Captain. He was a key figure in the repression campaign against the failed communist uprisings of 1926. After the rebellion broke out, Becking was sent to Bantam Residency in November 1926 with a company of Menadonese soldiers and helped put down the unrest in that area.

When the Governor-general of the Dutch East Indies de Graeff decided to exile hundreds or thousands of Communist Party members, Becking was sent to scout a location for their exile. He identified a location 450 kilometres up the Digul river in New Guinea, a barren, sparsely populated area with endemic Malaria. The initial camp site was called Tanahmerah; Becking was sent with KNIL soldiers and convict laborers to prepare the site for construction. They arrived in January 1927 and built a dock on the river, barracks, a hospital, a radio station and post office, and other infrastructure. The first group of fifty internees arrived in March, accompanied by thirty family members, and Becking became the first camp administrator.

During his time in charge of the camp, Becking occasionally tried to lead KNIL soldiers in punitive raids against the local Papuan population, who generally managed to escape into the jungle before they arrived. As more waves of exiles continued to arrive throughout 1927, Becking came to resent the position of the colonial government which forbade him from enforcing strict discipline, forced labour and punishment on the prisoners and reprimanded him when he tried to. It was his idea to establish a second, more remote camp upriver at Tanahtinggi to separately intern the most rebellious detainees. M. A. Monsjou, a civil servant who had been Controller at Fakfak replaced Becking as administrator at the end of October. The largest school built for children of detainees in the camp, which could accommodate 7 grades, was named after Becking.

Becking continued to serve in KNIL in various parts of the Indies for the 5 years after he left Digoel. He gave a lecture to the right-wing Vaderlandsche Club in May 1930 about the establishment of Digoel. Although he admitted he had to watch his words as a still-serving KNIL officer, he suggested that the site had not been well chosen because it could not support the health or agricultural needs of the residents. Not long after the lecture, Becking was elected to be chairman of the Surabaya Vaderlandsche Club. He continued to lecture about Digoel, the 1926 uprising and anti-communism at events put on by the club around Java.

In March 1932 he cofounded a Dutch-only shooting club, which he sat on the board of. In 1932 he retired from KNIL and was honourably discharged.

=== Post-military career and politics ===
After retiring from the military, Becking continued to support himself by giving lectures about Digoel, the rise of Japan, and other topics, primarily to the Vaderlandsche Club. He was also interested in Theosophy, but soon turned towards Fascist politics. He joined the Nationaal-Socialistische Beweging (NSB), a Dutch fascist party; by the time of NSB leader Anton Mussert's visit to Java in 1935, Becking already held a prominent role. Becking was promoted to head of the Java branch, headquartered in Batavia, in early 1936.

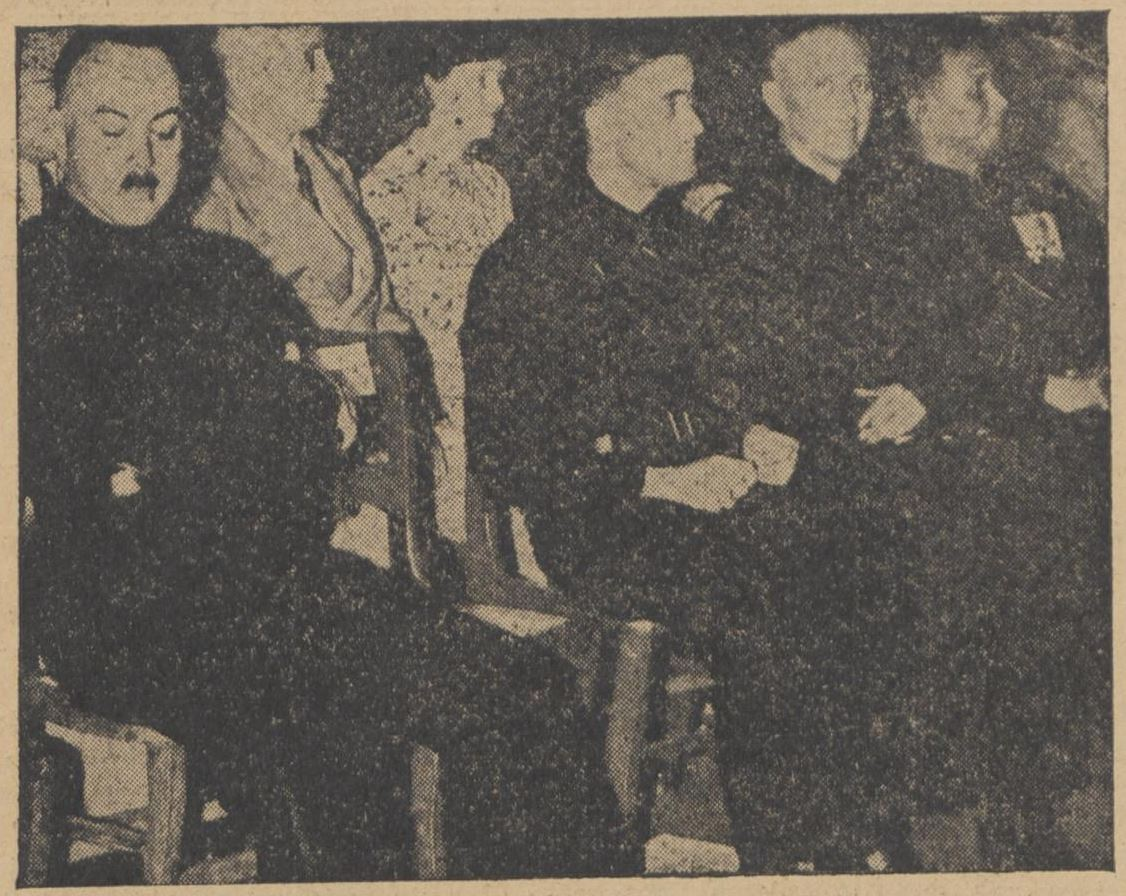
Nationaal-Socialistische Beweging members in Batavia, 1938. Becking is 2nd from the right.

With the funding of German interests, he also led some gold prospecting expeditions and developments in New Guinea starting in 1937, including one that worked for two years near Tanahmerah and which brought a lot more ships and airplanes to that remote area. Socialist newspapers like Het Volk accused the effort of somehow being tied in with NSB activities, as it employed several of the party's members. However, the Tanahmerah exploration closed in 1939 when yields of gold were insufficient. In 1939, the NSB had a period where several leaders were promoted and left the party; Becking was one of them.

=== Exile to Surinam and death ===
On 10 May 1940, the day of the German invasion of the Netherlands, authorities in the Dutch East Indies enacted martial law and carried out mass arrests of German nationals and supposed German sympathizers living there. They also detained Dutch citizens who were NSB members; despite having left the party, Becking was also detained. These prisoners were initially detained on Onrust Island, Ngawi, and other sites in East Java; none faced trial or were charged with any crimes. After the Netherlands declared war on Japan in 1941, the Indies government found that the Indies was no longer a secure place to imprison them and began to make plans to deport them. German nationals were sent to India and Siam whereas Dutch citizens were sent to Surinam. Becking was identified as one of the "irreconcilable" political figures who would have to be exiled; Louis Johan Alexander Schoonheyt, the former Digoel doctor and an active NSB member, and Ernest Douwes Dekker, and Indonesian nationalist, were among them. They were put aboard the Tjisedané in Surabaya in January 1942 and arrived in Paramaribo, Surinam on 21 March 1942. An internment camp called Jodensavanne was built for them, but it wasn't ready when they arrived; the internees spent six months at Fort Nieuw-Amsterdam.

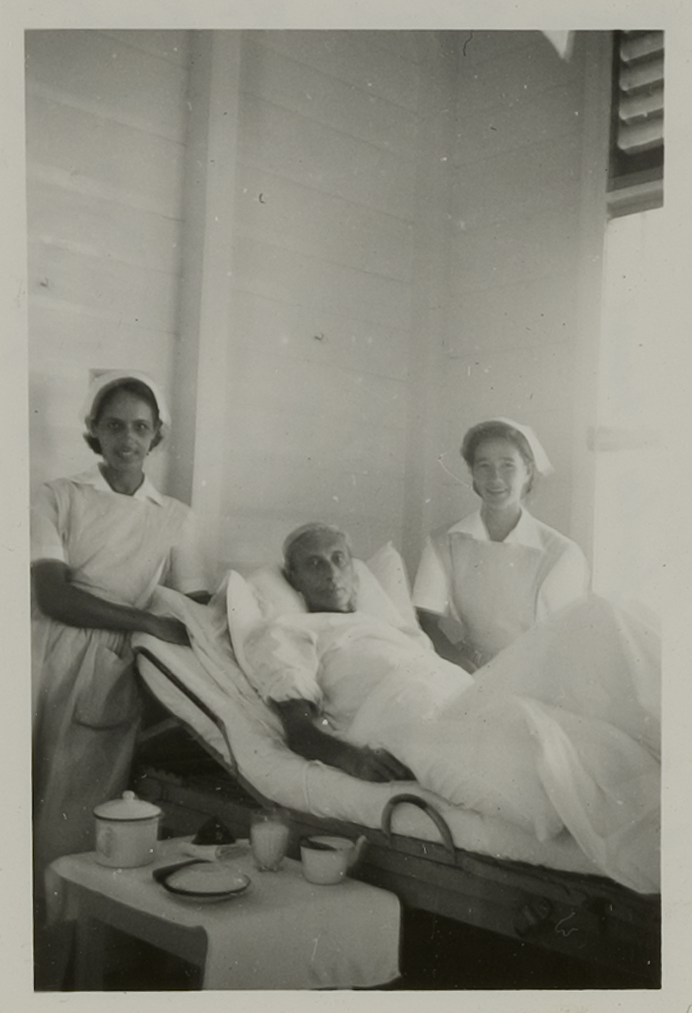
Photo of Becking in a hospital in Surinam in 1945, shortly before his death

When they arrived in Jodensavanne, internees were immediately put to work in hard labour in a "green hell", denied medication for dysentery, and subjected to degrading hazing tactics, despite not having been charged with any crime. The prisoners were considered traitors for their support for the NSB and Nazi Germany, and therefore the guards treated them mercilessly. The first camp commander, Gebuys, was later said to have told prisoners that they would only be sent to hospital if they died. They were regularly beaten with clubs or had their hands and feet shackled together; two went on hunger strike and died as a result, while others were tortured and killed by guards after an escape attempt. Becking became quite sick under these conditions, and Schoonheyt, his former Digoel colleague, tried his best to treat him.

The detainees were not immediately released upon the liberation of the Netherlands in May 1945. Becking's health was quite poor and he died in a hospital in Paramaribo in 1945 while still having the status of prisoner.
