= Lie Eng Hok =

Indonesian Activist and Journalist

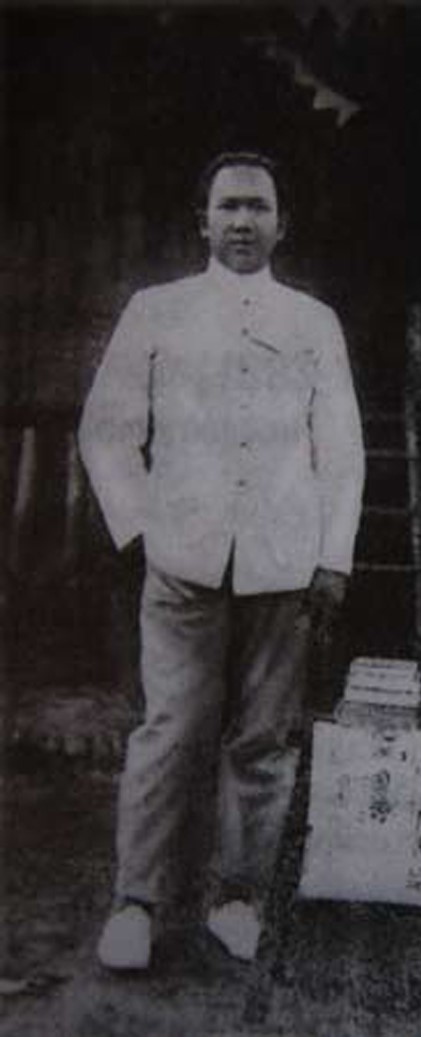
- Born: February 7, 1893; Tangerang, Dutch East Indies
- Died: December 27, 1961 (aged 68); Semarang, Central Java, Indonesia
- Awards: Pioneer of Independence (SK Menteri Sosial RI No. Pol 111 PK tanggal 22 Januari 1959.)

Lie Eng Hok (1893-1961) was an Indonesian independence activist and Indonesian Communist Party (PKI) supporter in the Dutch East Indies. He was also a journalist for the popular Chinese Indonesian newspaper Sin Po. The Dutch government accused him of being involved in the 1926 Banten rebellion and exiled him to the Boven-Digoel concentration camp from 1927 to 1932. He was a personal friend of Wage Rudolf Supratman, author of the Indonesian national anthem. He was granted the status of Pioneer of Independence by the Indonesian government in 1959.

== Biography ==
Lie was born in Balaraja village, Tangerang Regency, Banten residency, Dutch East Indies on February 7, 1893. Little is known about his early life.

In the 1910s and 1920s he was a journalist for the Sin Po newspaper, as well as for lesser-known Malay language papers such as Sin Bin, Tjemboek, and Kong Po. According to historian Michael C. Williams, Lie may have been an early convert to the PKI's cause in Banten. The first cohort of PKI recruits there were apparently all printing press employees, notably of the Dutch language paper De Banten-bode, and Lie was among them. He got in trouble with the law in Serang, in September 1925 for trying to visit a colleague in prison and refusing to back down when permission was denied. And in October 1925 the PKI's office opened in a building he owned in the Pasar Serang.

In 1926, he left Banten and opened a bookstore in Pasar Johor, Semarang. While operating the store, and buying and selling books in private homes, he would often act as a messenger for people sympathetic to the PKI or the Indonesian independence movement. However, in autumn 1926, police from Banten forwarded a request to Semarang to have him arrested on the suspicion that he had been involved in the PKI rebellion against the government there. His charges accused him of having been a Communist Party propagandist and having fought in the armed rebellion under the name Eming. In late 1927 he was exiled to the Boven-Digoel concentration camp in what is now Papua. He was only one of a handful of Chinese Indonesian detainees exiled by the Dutch among the total 1300, who were mostly Native Indonesians. Most of the other ethnically Chinese people detained in Boven-Digoel were also accused of being PKI members involved in the events of 1926.

While there, his refusal to collaborate with Dutch authorities put him among a small subset of prisoners who were denied proper housing or sustenance; he apparently survived for a time by repairing other inmates' shoes. He wrote a letter to Sin Po in 1929 about worsening conditions in the camp, which was translated and reprinted in the Dutch press. In it, he noted that the camp authorities had reduced the prisoners' stipend by one quarter, and that by the following year they would no longer receive any at all. He said that he had operated a coffee shop in the camp to support himself for some time, but that it was no longer viable and he asked for support from Sin Po.

He was released from Boven-Digoel after a decree from the Governor-General of the Dutch East Indies on January 19, 1932. He returned to Semarang and apparently resumed his work as a bookseller.

On December 22, 1959, he was declared a Pioneer of Independence (Indonesian: Perintis Kemerdekaan by the Indonesian government.

He died on December 27, 1961. He was initially buried in a public cemetery in Semarang, but in 1986 his body was reburied in the Giri Tunggal Heroes' Cemetery. His name is apparently one of the only two Chinese names found on graves there.
