= Fifteen Years in Boven Digoel =

Dutch-language memoir (1973)

- Author: I. F. M. Salim
- Genre: Non-fiction

Fifteen Years in Boven Digoel: Concentration Camp in New Guinea (Dutch: Vijftien jaar Boven-Digoel: Concentratiekamp op Nieuw-Guinea, Indonesian: Lima belas tahun Digul: Kamp konsentrasi di Nieuw Guinea) is a 1973 Dutch-language memoir written by I. F. M. Salim , a former detainee in the Boven-Digoel concentration camp in New Guinea. It was the only Dutch-language book about Boven Digoel ever published by a former prisoner. Its Indonesian translation was published in 1977.

== History ==
Ignatius Franciscus Michael Salim (1902–85), born Abdul Chalid Salim near Fort de kock, Sumatra, Dutch East Indies, was the brother of Indonesian nationalist Agus Salim. After working as a journalist in the 1920s, he was arrested for his communist activities in Medan in June 1927. In 1928, he was exiled along with thousands of Communist Party of Indonesia members to the Dutch internment camp for political prisoners at Boven Digoel near Merauke, New Guinea. Despite not being charged with a crime, he was interned there for another fifteen years until the Japanese invasion of the Dutch East Indies. In his final year in the camp he converted to Catholicism and changed his name. He was evacuated to Australia with most of the other remaining internees in 1943, and after that his exile was annulled. He moved to the Netherlands after the war, partly to seek treatment for chronic malaria which he had contracted in the camp. By chance, he encountered the ex-Digoel camp doctor Schoonheyt, who was again working as a civilian doctor. Schoonheyt, who had himself published a book praising the camp at Digoel during the 1930s, had changed his views after the war. He became Salim's doctor and befriended him. He eventually signed over the copyright to his own book to Salim, who used it in writing his memoirs about life in the camp.

Salim completed his memoir, which was written in Dutch, and published it with Uitgeverij Contact in Amsterdam in September 1973. The former prime minister Willem Schermerhorn introduced the book at its launch in The Hague and called it "the most important contribution from the Indonesian side about our colonial history." Schermerhorn noted it was better addressed it to a Dutch audience who knew very little about the history of the Digoel camp rather than Indonesians who would be generally familiar with it.

The book became a bestseller in the Netherlands. Reviews in papers like the Leeuwarder Courant and Het Vrije Volk noted that, after his life experience the book could have had a bitter tone, but it didn't. The cultural commentator Rudy Kousbroek, himself a former internee in Japanese camps in the Indies during the war, thought the book had a completely different tone from the books written by Dutch internees of the Japanese. He also thought it was the only Dutch-language book that described the circumstances of the camp in detail. (Presumably he didn't know about Schoonheyt's book which had been out of print for decades.) He noted that, if Salim's health had not been too poor for him to return to Indonesia after the war, the book would probably never have been written. The historian Harry Poeze called the book a "mild and apologetic account" (mild en vergoelijkend verslag) that may have contributed to Dutch feelings of guilt about the camp. The historian Elizabeth Chandra called it "the one account close to being comprehensive."

An Indonesian translation by Hazil Tanzil and J. Taufik Salim was published by Bulan Bintang in Jakarta in 1977. A revised and expanded new Dutch edition was published by NV Uitgeverij Smit van 1876 in Hengelo in 1980.
