= Boven-Digoel concentration camp =

Internment camp in the Dutch East Indies

Coordinates: 6°5′48″S 140°17′52″E

Boven-Digoel
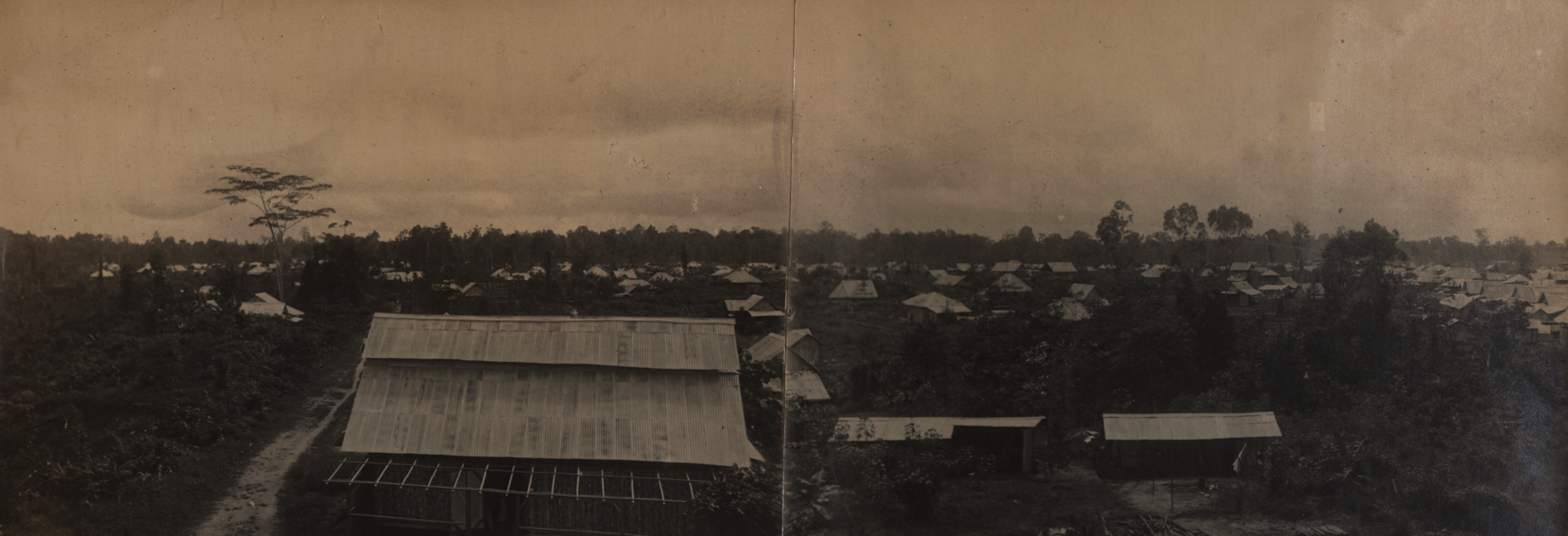
- A view of Boven-Digoel concentration camp, Dutch East Indies, 1927.
- Interactive map of Boven-Digoel
- Country: Kingdom of the Netherlands
- Colony: Dutch East Indies
- Location: Tanahmerah and other sites on the banks of the river Digul in Molukken Residency
- Opened: 1927
- Closed: 1947
- Founder: Dutch colonial government

Boven-Digoel, often simply called Digoel, was a Dutch concentration camp for political detainees operated in the Dutch East Indies from 1927 to 1947. The Dutch used it to detain thousands of Indonesians, most of whom were members of the Communist Party of Indonesia (PKI), Indonesian nationalists, and their families. It was located in a remote area on the banks of the river Digul, in what is now Boven Digoel Regency in South Papua, Indonesia. The camp was originally opened to intern communists after the failed 1926 communist uprising in Java and the 1926–27 uprising in Sumatra; at its largest extent in 1930 it held around 1,300 internees and 700 family members.

== History ==
For hundreds of years, the Dutch authorities in the Indies exiled politically unwanted figures in a variety of places, including what is now Eastern Indonesia, as well as deportation outside the colony to Europe or the Dutch Cape Colony. An early example of exile as punishment took place during the French and British interregnum in the Dutch East Indies, when Stamford Raffles exiled convicts to Karimunjawa. Starting in 1854, the Governor-general of the Dutch East Indies was entitled to exile any resident of the colony without charge or explanation per his "Extraordinary rights" (Dutch: exorbitante rechten) to preserve peace and order.

=== De Graeff era (1926–31) ===
This tactic of exiling politically unwanted Indonesians was generally used on a one-off basis until the late 1920s. Following the start of a communist uprising in West Java on 12 November 1926, there was an emergency meeting of the Council of the Dutch East Indies where Governor General Andries Cornelis Dirk de Graeff insisted that a large number of communist leaders across the Indies had to be rounded up as soon as possible.

Soon, thousands of Indonesians were targeted by the Dutch in reaction to the uprisings. Roughly 4,500 were accused of participating directly in the uprising and were imprisoned or sentenced to death. At first this included Communist leaders with documented involvement, but was expanded to include to almost anyone who had taken an identifiable leadership role in the PKI, and then to potential new leaders who could conceivably take the place of those who were detained.

Another 8,500 who had not committed any specific crime also came under scrutiny, and in many cases were also detained. These were low-level Communist party members, journalists, and other associates who had no provable involvement in the events. Out of this 8,500, around a thousand were identified as troublesome. In the period following the uprising, in order to support the mass repression, the political police force was greatly expanded.

With thousands of Indonesians in custody, De Graeff thought that a formal trial would give them a platform to spread their message, and decided that they should be exiled, ideally all to the same place. By early December, a site at Boven-Digoel in an isolated part of Papua was identified as an ideal place for the mass exile by Royal Netherlands East Indies Army (KNIL) Captain Theo Becking, who had led the repression of the uprising in Java. This location was 450 kilometres up the Digul river and was a barren, sparsely populated area with endemic Malaria. Becking later admitted that the location was chosen hastily to be able to intern the communists as quickly as possible, and that the extent of malaria was not understood at first. It was originally thought to be suitable for rice cultivation and agriculture. Papuan people who lived in the area were initially hostile to the establishment of the camp. Captain Becking was sent to the Tanah Merah site with KNIL soldiers and convict laborers to prepare the camp. They arrived in January 1927 and built a dock on the river, barracks, a hospital, a radio station and post office, and other infrastructure. The first group of fifty internees arrived in March, accompanied by thirty family members, and Becking became the first camp administrator. The Danish travel writer Aage Krarup Nielsen was allowed to sail on the monthlong trip with this first group of exiles.

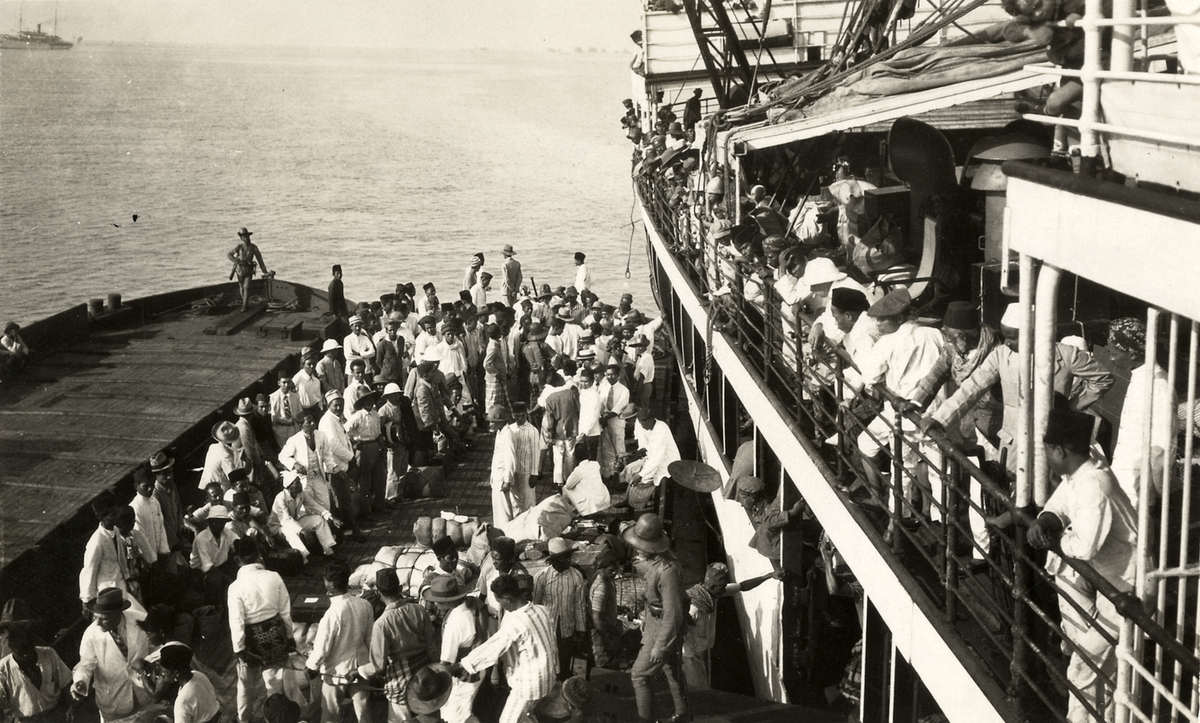
Indonesian communist prisoners being exiled to Boven-Digoel, 1927

More boatloads of internees and their families continued to arrive throughout the year, and M. A. Monsjou, a civil servant who had been Controller at Fakfak replaced Becking as administrator at the end of October. Internees were allowed to bring personal items with them from Java and Sumatra. Forced labour was used at first, but quickly abandoned when camp authorities decided that internees were willing to work hard voluntarily to improve their living situation. Captain Becking had been in favour of military discipline and forced labour and was overruled by the government in Batavia. After that, internees who were willing to work for the public good were paid a regular wage instead. Although the internees were managed and surveilled, the camp was not known for strict discipline by guards or prison-like conditions; internees were allowed to work and live "normally" in this place of exile. It was certainly never intended to be an extermination camp like Auschwitz concentration camp; the historian Rudolf Mrázek compared it instead to Theresienstadt Ghetto. There were no fences around the camp, but the surrounding terrain was so difficult that escape was almost impossible. The only part of the camp that was surrounded with barbed wire was the military camp where the 100 KNIL soldiers and administrators lived. This was explicitly done to separate its residents from the internees and to keep them away from political propaganda.

A subset of internees, including many of the most ideological communists, refused to work and were considered "irreconcilables" (Dutch: onverzoenlijken) by the Dutch. These even sabotaged the crops and efforts of the cooperative detainees. Therefore, a second, more remote camp site called Tanah Tinggi was created for them at Becking's suggestion, 50 kilometres or five hours' motorboat trip upriver from Tanah Merah. Internees in that separate camp, who were also called "naturalists," were mostly isolated from the economy and life in the Tanah Merah camp and only received limited monthly rations of food, which they supplemented with gardening and fishing.

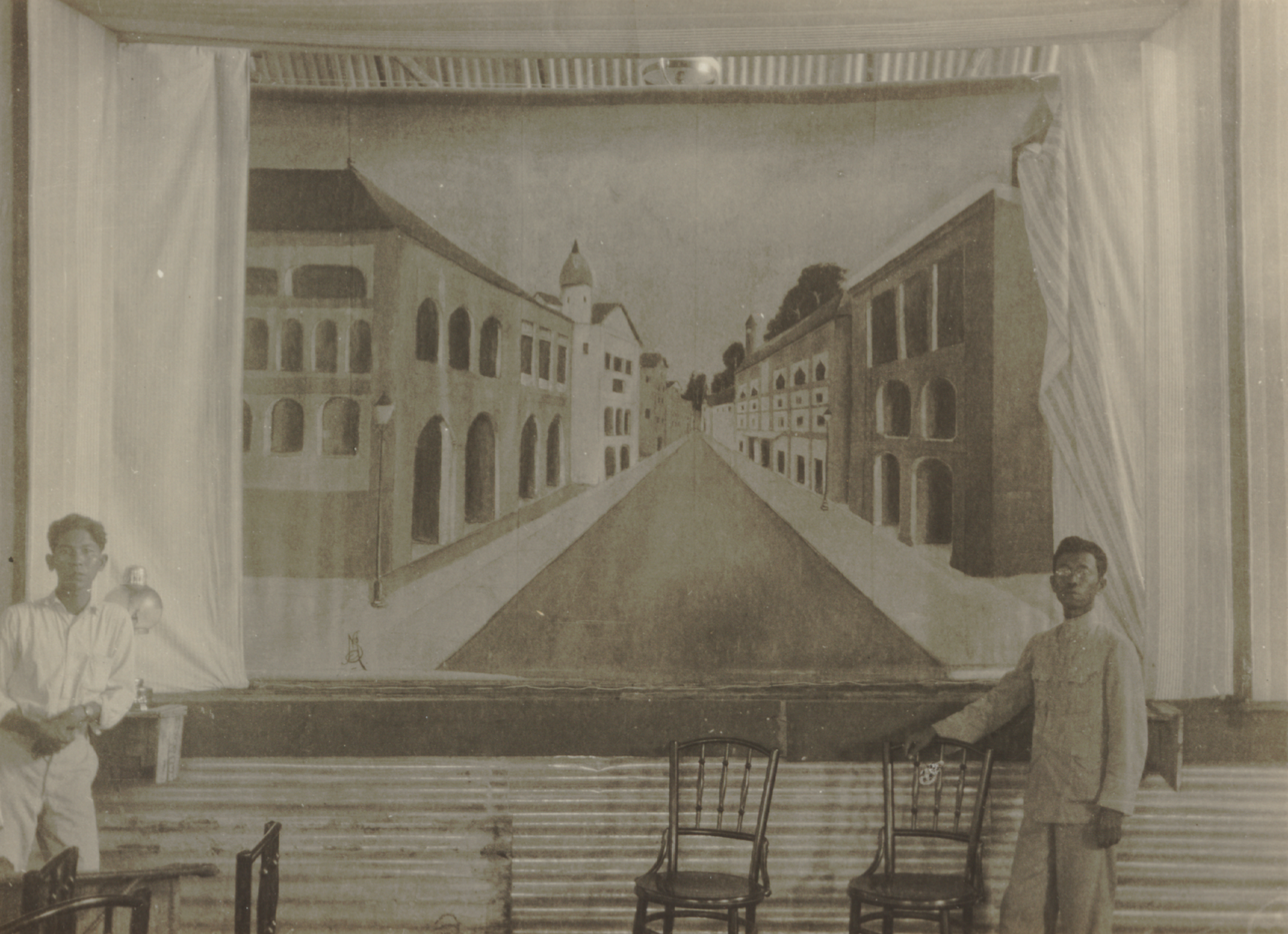
Internees at Tanah Merah preparing the set for an opera performance, late 1920s

Meanwhile, the main camp at Tanah Merah continued to be built up. A Chinese Indonesian shopkeeper from Ambon was permitted to open two shops, one on the administrative side and one for the internees. By February 1928 the camps contained 666 internees and 437 family members. A handful of the exiles were female activists; these included Soetitah who was chair of the women's section of the Communist party. As Digoel grew, it started to attract the attention of the press. The liberal Dutch journalist Marcus van Blankenstein was allowed to visit the camp; his scathing articles in the Nieuwe Rotterdamsche Courant in the fall of 1928 suggested that innocent people had been imprisoned there without charge, and that sanitary conditions were so poor (especially in the Tanah Tinggi camp) that people were dying "like rats during a plague". After that, the government promised to release detainees who were well-behaved and did not pose a threat to peace and order. By 1929 the detainees in Tanah Merah were living in six "hamlets" made up of shacks with tin roofs; the original barracks were dismantled. Internees generally settled along ethnic lines, with Sumatrans, Javanese, Madurese, and people from Banten (where the 1926 revolt had been centered) living in their own sections. A mosque, Protestant and Catholic churches, and shops were built. Sports and theatre groups and musical ensembles were also established, including a jazz band led by Abdoe'lxarim MS and a kroncong band. The detainees also had gardens, but the poor soil made their yield limited. Despite those activities which give the impression of a normal life, morale was quite low and living conditions remained difficult. Even the administrator Monsjou contracted malaria and left the region for Surabaya for several months in early 1929.

While internees were generally kept isolated from news of the outside world, they were allowed to write letters, although these could be censored. So, many complained to newspapers; one former journalist, Lie Eng Hok, wrote a letter to his former paper Sin Po in 1929 about worsening conditions, which was translated and reprinted in the Dutch press. In it, he noted that the camp authorities had reduced the prisoners' stipend by one quarter and that by the following year, they would no longer receive any at all, and that the prisoners were becoming so poor that they could no longer afford to spend money on each other's "businesses". Another issue was that the tree cover had been so thoroughly cleared to make space for the camp that there was no shade from the sun in most of the camps. Food was also substandard a lot of the time, although there was always some available. The fact that their imprisonment was indefinite and that there was no way to appeal it also contributed to the general sense of misery among detainees.

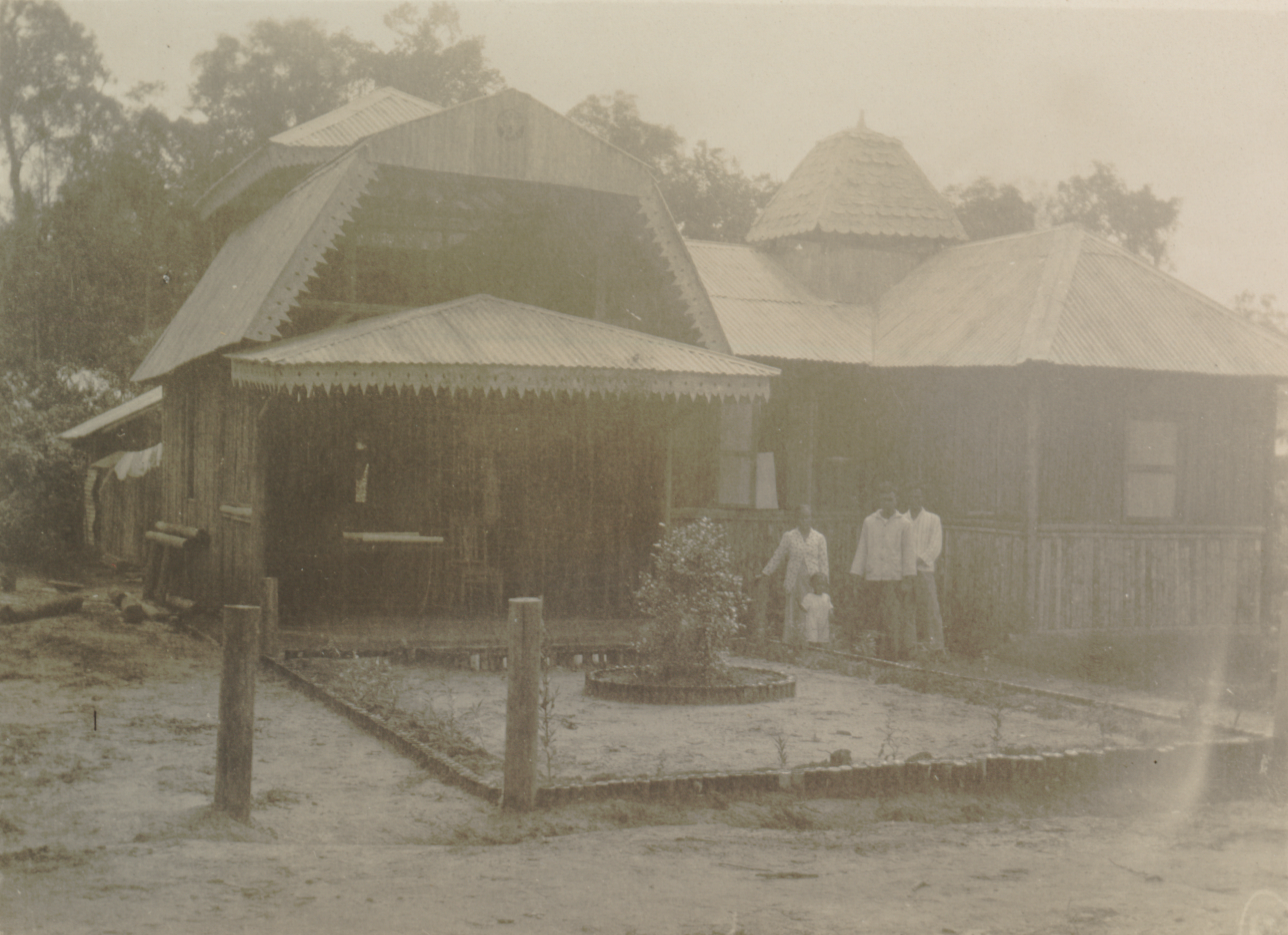
Internee and family outside their house in the Tanahmerah camp, circa 1928

A member of the Council of the Netherland Indies, W. P. Hillen, was sent to inspect the camp in April 1930. At that point the camp was at its largest, with 1,308 internees and around 700 family members. He interviewed hundreds of internees and decided that the local officials had been too optimistic in their reports to the colonial government, noting that many of the internees were unwilling to work for the government on principle and were living in poor conditions. In his final report he said that roughly two thirds of the 600 internees he interviewed should be released, and he expressed his doubts that Tanah Merah was a suitable place for long-term settlement, due to the poor soil and prevalence of malaria. He thought authorities should gradually release all but the most recalcitrant detainees and that they should eventually be relocated to populated areas. Governor General de Graeff was convinced, and released 219 internees in December 1930. This emptied out several of the "districts" of the Tanah Merah camp, and many of those released stayed away from politics after returning to Java and Sumatra.

=== De Jonge era (1931–36) ===
Bonifacius Cornelis de Jonge, a conservative aristocrat, became Governor General in September 1931. He disagreed with the idea of gradually reducing the camp's population until it could be closed; fear of exile among Indonesian nationalists in Java and Sumatra was considered to be an added benefit. Since it would not be closed, doses of quinine were prescribed to internees to reduce cases of malaria. It helped somewhat, but a number of high-profile prisoners died, including Marco Kartodikromo who died of malaria in 1932, and Aliarcham who died of tuberculosis in 1933.

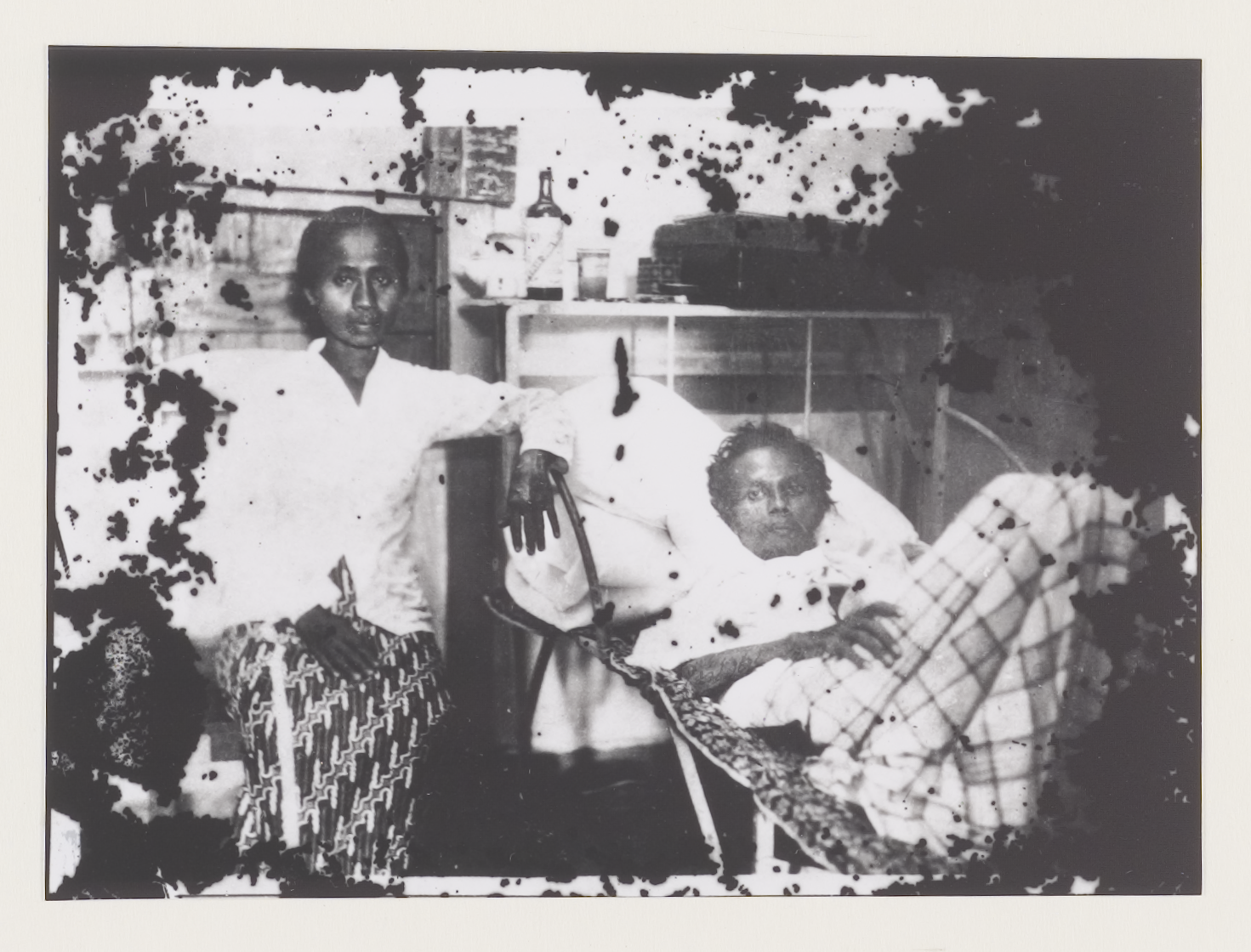
Mas Marco, activist and writer, ill with malaria, along with his wife

De Jonge renovated and further developed the camp, despite the Indies' financial difficulties as a result of the Great Depression. In the first two years of his term it was still communists and other leftists who were being exiled to Digoel, including those who had finished prison terms for participating in the 1926 uprising. Members of new groups, such as Tan Malaka's Pari party started to be exiled as well. Civil administration of the camp, which had existed since late 1927, was abolished in mid-1934 with the reintroduction of military rule over the camp. It was in 1933 and 1934 that the government turned its attention to non-communist nationalists. Members of the Persatuan Muslim Indonesia, the Partai Sarekat Islam Indonesia, Partindo, and other groups were targeted. Eventually even high-profile intellectuals such as Mohammad Hatta, who would become the first vice president of Indonesia, and Sutan Sjahrir, future first Indonesian Prime Minister were both exiled in 1935. However, they were relocated to the Banda Islands a few months later, as Digoel was considered too harsh a destination for them. This set a precedent and from then on university-educated intellectuals were generally exiled there and not to Digoel.

=== Van Starkenborgh era (1936–42) ===
Alidius Tjarda van Starkenborgh Stachouwer, who would be the last colonial Governor General of the Indies, took over for de Jonge in September 1936. He kept Boven Digoel open as a part of the system of repression against Indonesian nationalists. An Attorney General report at around that time examined the situation of hundreds of ex-Digoel internees who had been freed. Many of these were still under police surveillance, but the report decided that they did not have to be re-exiled unless they were still active in hardline communist groups. The report also determined that the 70 "uncooperative" detainees in the Tanah Tinggi camp should remain there indefinitely.

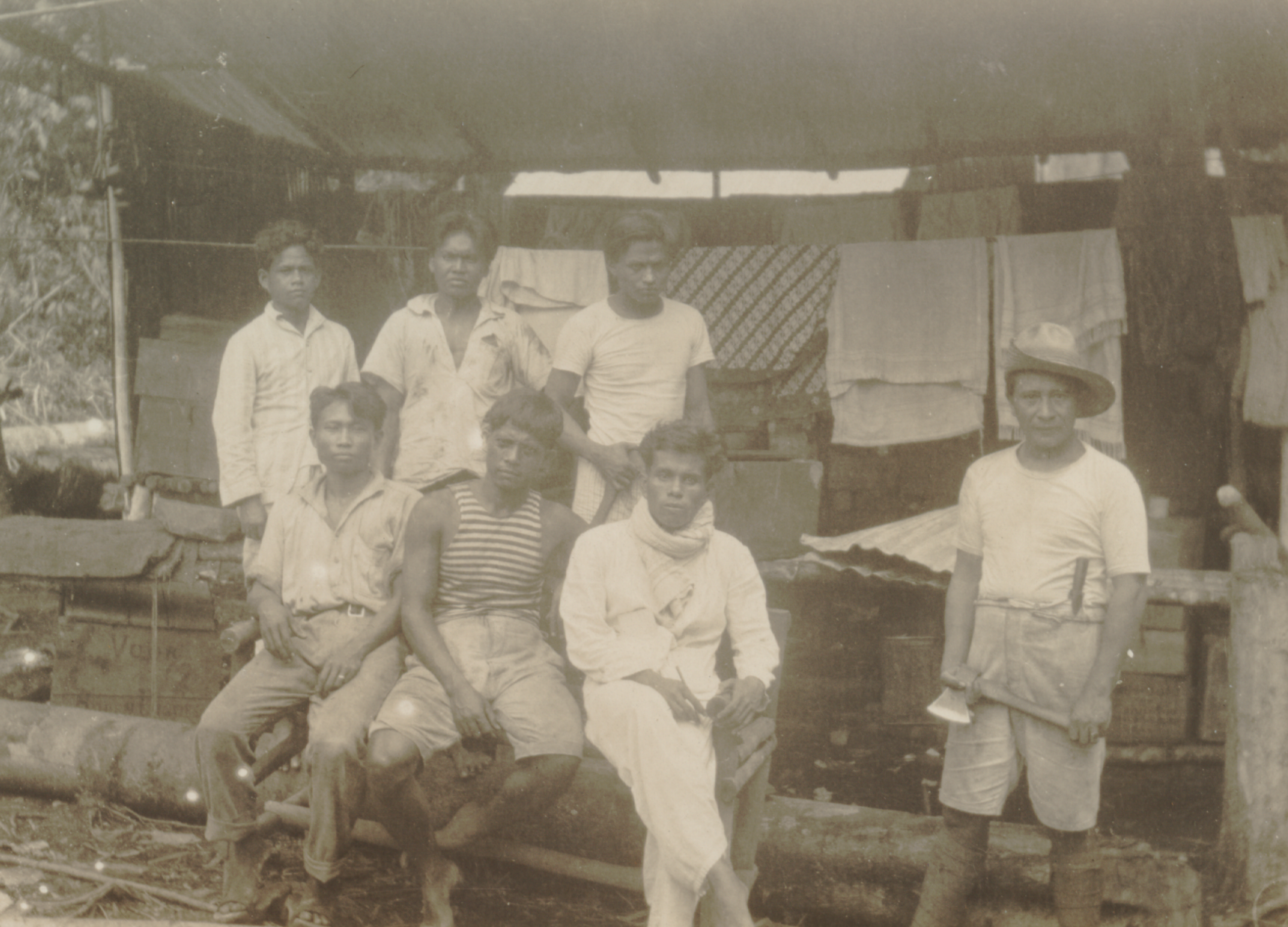
Detainees as the Tanahtinggi site, late 1920s

In 1936, the camp doctor L. J. A. Schoonheyt published a book about his experiences there in which he claimed conditions in the camp were ideal and even pleasant; copies of the book made their way back to camp internees who were enraged by his whitewashing.

A gold mining company set up in Tanah Merah in 1937, which led to the construction of an airfield and much higher traffic of foreign ships.

In the late 1930s, the Dutch continued to use Digoel as a way to threaten dissidents in the Indies. Their presence there was also maintained as a Dutch presence in face of Japanese expansionism. In 1938 the Governor General proposed that twelve more communists be exiled there, including members of Pari, members the Illegal PKI set up by Musso, and PKI members who had been in clandestine communication with communists in the Netherlands. These people who were nominated for exile were kept in "pretrial detention" for some time. Among the communists exiled in 1938 were Djokosoedjono and Achmad Soemadi.

The gold mining company folded in 1939 and dismantled its infrastructure. In May 1940, the Dutch colonial ministry decided to stop referring to Boven-Digoel as a concentration camp, seeing how the Nazi use of such camps was making it politically unpopular; they sent a memo to all departments to cease using that term. Following the German invasion of the Netherlands, there was speculation that members of the Dutch fascist party Nationaal-Socialistische Beweging would be interned at Boven Digoel. In the end, they were deported to Jodensavanne internment camp in Surinam instead. Among these were Captain Becking, the founder of the camp, and Dr. Schoonheyt, both of whom had joined the NSB in the late 1930s. But Indonesians continued to be exiled to Digoel until the final weeks of Dutch rule; the last one seems to have been a Chinese-Indonesian clerk from Sumatra who had been active in an anti-Japanese and pro-communist group.

=== Japanese occupation and closure (1942–47) ===
Despite the Japanese invasion of the Dutch East Indies and the fall of Dutch rule, Boven Digoel was so physically remote that it was essentially unaffected. By this time the Tanah Merah camp had 295 internees and 212 family members living in it. The camp now fell under the directions of a government in exile which had been set up in Australia in April 1942. In February 1943 there were rumours of a Japanese invasion at Merauke and U.S. General Douglas MacArthur identified the political prisoners as a possible fifth column. Charles van der Plas, a key member of the government in exile, made most of the decisions about the detainees' fate during the war. In March, 512 people were sent from Digoel to Australia, including 22 from Tanah Tinggi. A few, mainly Tanah Tinggi residents, remained in Digoel by their own choice. The Australian government had some objections to the transfer; detainees were initially imprisoned in Liverpool, New South Wales and in a newly built section of the Cowra POW camp, but were released after complaints from trade unions and the Communist Party of Australia. Some of those went on to work on farms and munitions factories or, in the case of some non-communist nationalists, in anti-Japanese propaganda efforts. After the end of the war in August 1945, after some concerns that they would be re-imprisoned, the Dutch East Indies government in exile annulled the exile orders against 267 who were in Australia.

With the departure of the Japanese, the Dutch reasserted control over the Indies through the Netherlands Indies Civil Administration and entered into conflict with nationalists in what is called the Indonesian National Revolution. Van der Plas was now a member of NICA; seeing the outbreak of the Revolution, he anticipated that they camp would soon be filled again with a new round of exiles. Instead, the camp started to be dismantled in 1946 and the remaining 24 detainees were freed. The former camp site eventually became the town of Tanahmerah, administrative seat of the Boven Digoel Regency.

== Legacy and literary representation ==
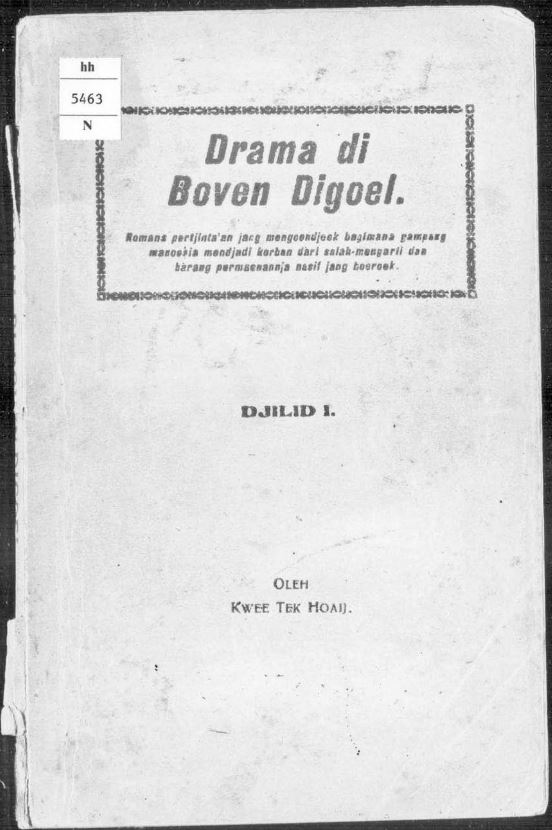
Title page of Drama di Boven Digoel by Kwee Tek Hoay, 1938

Several accounts or novelizations of life in the camp were released while it was still operating. These include Drama di Boven Digoel by Kwee Tek Hoay, serialized in the magazine Panorama from 1929 to 1932 and published in book form in 1938; Darah dan aer-mata di Boven Digoel by Oen Bo Tik (1931), Antara idoep dan mati atawa Boeron dari Boven-Digoel by Wiranta (1931); Merah by Lim Khing Ho (1937); Siasat yang Dahsyat by Shamsuddin Saleh (1936); Boven-Digoel: Het land van communisten en kannibalen by L. J. A. Schoonheyt (1936); and Indonesia, een politiestaat by van Munster and former detainee Soekaesih.

In the early independence era of Indonesia, a number of ex-Digoel detainees entered Indonesian politics. This included not only Hatta and Sjahrir, as mentioned above, but many Communist Party members who sat in the House of Representatives during the Sukarno era. An archive of materials about the camp was also set up at National Archives of Indonesia in Jakarta. Books continued to be published about Digoel as well. The Indonesian novelist Pramoedya Ananta Toer, himself a political prisoner during the New Order era, was very interested in Boven-Digoel. He released a 2001 anthology of accounts of the camp titled Cerita dari Digul (Stories from Digul), and the protagonist of his 1985 novel Footsteps experiences exile to the Eastern parts of the Indies as well. I. F. M. Salim, a former Digoel prisoner, also published his account in the Netherlands in 1973, Fifteen Years in Boven Digoel (Dutch: Vijftien jaar Boven-Digoel: concentratiekamp in Nieuw-Guinea: bakermat van de Indonesische onafhankelijkheid). It was published in Indonesian translation in 1977 as Limabelas tahun Digul: kamp konsentrasi di Nieuw Guinea, tempat persemaian kemerdekaan Indonesia.

== See also ==
- Category:Boven-Digoel concentration camp detainees
- Het Digoel Wilhelmus
- Boven Digoel Regency
