= I. F. M. Salim =

Indonesian journalist, communist activist and political prisoner

Ignatius Franciscus Michael Salim
- Born: Mohammed Ali Abdul Chalid ben Soetan Mohammad Salim; 24 November 1902; Sumatra, Dutch East Indies
- Died: 10 March 1985 (aged 82); The Hague, Netherlands
- Occupations: writer, civil servant
- Notable work: Fifteen Years in Boven Digoel

Ignatius Franciscus Michael Salim (24 November 1902–10 March 1985), born Abdul Chalid Salim, was an Indonesian journalist, communist activist and political prisoner. He was imprisoned without trial by the Dutch in the Boven-Digoel concentration camp from 1928 to 1943. He was the brother of Agus Salim and the cousin of Sutan Sjahrir. His book Fifteen Years in Boven Digoel (Dutch: Vijftien jaar Boven-Digoel: concentratiekamp in Nieuw-Guinea, 1973) was the only Dutch-language book about Digoel ever published by a former prisoner.

== Biography ==
=== Early life and journalism career ===
Mohammed Ali Abdul Chalid ben Soetan Mohammad Salim was born 24 November 1902 into an elite Minangkabau family in Koto Gadang, near Fort de Kock, West Sumatra, Dutch East Indies. According to some accounts he may have been born on an island in the Riau Archipelago where his father worked at the time. His father, Soetan Mohammad Salim, was a colonial prosecutor and judge whose highest rank was chief judge for the indigenous court in Tanjung Pinang. His brother, Agus Salim, was a prominent anti-colonial intellectual who would later be Indonesia's first foreign minister, and his cousin Sutan Sjahrir would later be leader of the Socialist Party of Indonesia and Indonesia's first prime minister. Salim's family often spoke Dutch at home.

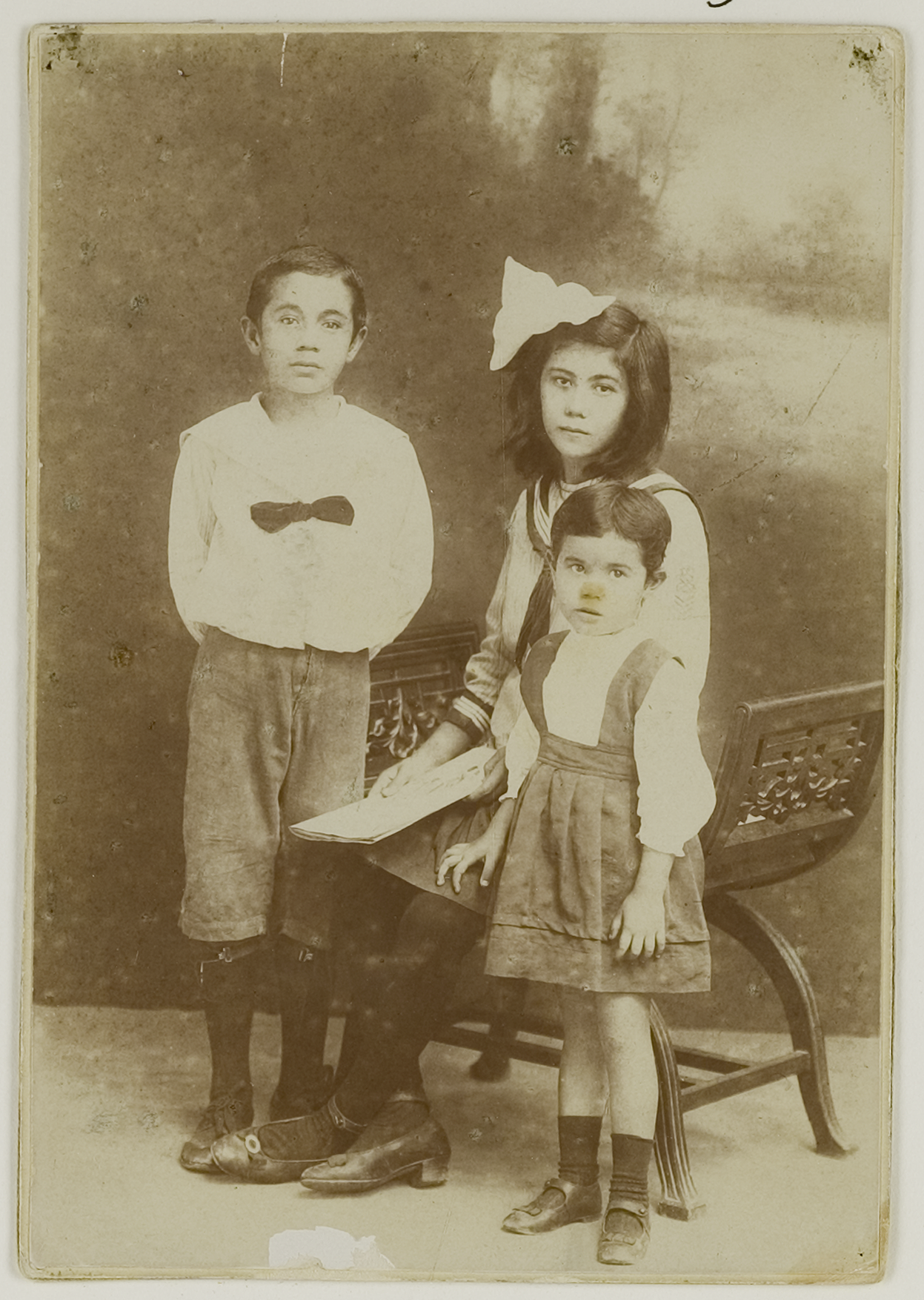
Salim and two of his sisters c.1910

By the time he was of school age, his father had retired to Weltevreden, outside Batavia, and had been appointed to the Landsraad. Salim was sent to a Dutch-language primary school there, and he later studied in Algemene middelbare schools (equivalent to a modern high school) in Batavia and Padang. He also lived in Surabaya for a time, where he was reportedly roommates with the communist Aliarcham, who would also later be exiled to Digoel. He also lived in Lumajang Regency and Pontianak for a time. When he embraced communism during this time, Salim recognized that he was turning his back on his elite upbringing; his brother Agus Salim was also a vocal anti-communist.

After finishing his schooling, by the mid-1920s, Salim was working as a journalist in Sumatra. He contributed to communist-affiliated papers such as Api and Njala, and edited the Sumatra-based PKI paper Halilintar Hindia and the Surabaya-based Proletar. He also edited non-communist papers like the Medan-based Pewarta Deli. He was also chairman of the Sarekat Boeroeh Tjitak (print workers' union), was active in the Communist Party and cofounder of Soeka Madjoe (Lovers of Progress).

=== Arrest and exile ===
Salim, who had been living in Medan at the time, was arrested in June 1927 along with Joesoef Efendi, a fellow activist in the Soeka Madjoe. Salim was initially released when no proof of any crime could be determined, but a further search of his possessions revealed documents that the police said proved that he and Efendi were planning to launch a violent communist uprising. In cases like this, proof or a criminal trial were not required for exile; both were sent to Digoel in early 1928.

They were shipped via Batavia and Makassar in what Salim complained were very poor conditions, with iron shackles for extended periods and being forced below decks in cattle storage and in the local jail in Makassar. When they were led back to the ship, Salim recalled that they sang The Internationale and communist anthems, which irritated the guards. After his arrival at Digoel, Salim was soon sent to Tanah Tinggi, a more remote camp for "difficult" prisoners who refused to work for the Dutch. He later recalled that he was told he may be able to leave Digoel soon, but he spent fifteen years in it.

In June 1928, Salim sent a written request to member Stokvis of the Volksraad Committee for Petitions asking that the advisory body look into the treatment of detainees in transit to Digoel. In particular he complained at their rough treatment from military officers on board, and the cramped quarters below deck which led internees to become ill. Another degrading imposition was that the internees were chained together in groups of five and were not unchained when they had to defecate. The Committee accepted the proposal, although an additional request by member Soeroso that further information be requested from the government was voted down. They did find some merit to his claims, however.

While in the Tanah Tinggi camp, Salim contracted a severe form of malaria and was sent to a military hospital on Ambon Island to recover. When he was healthy enough to leave, he was not sent back to Tanah Tinggi, but was sent to the less harsh main camp at Digoel which was called Tanah Merah; there he lived in Kampong B and worked in the camp hospital under doctor Schoonheyt for several years. After leaving the hospital in 1930, he worked at eradicating mosquitoes to help in the fight against malaria. In his walks around the camp grounds over the 1930s, he got to know every corner of it very well.

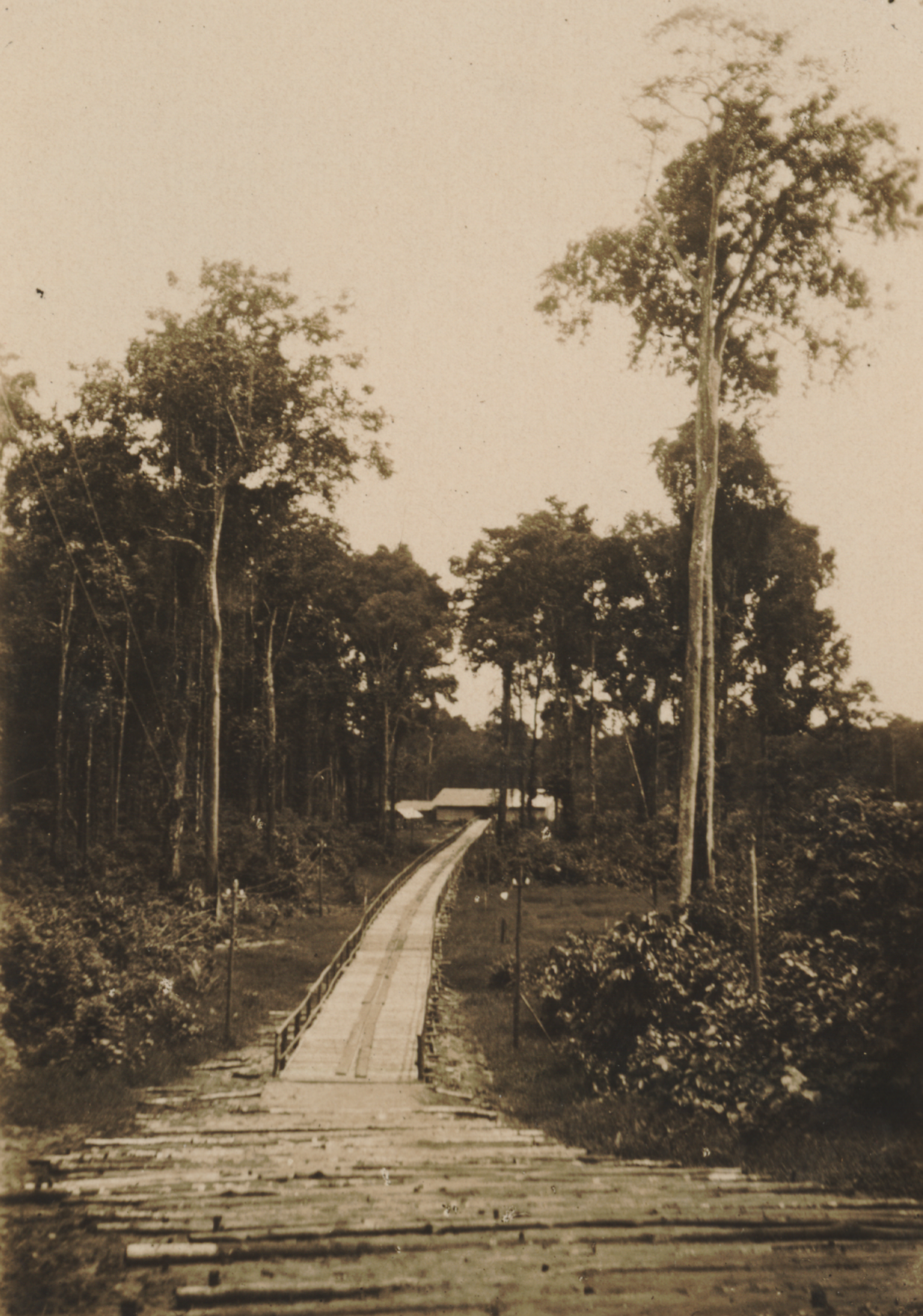
Footbridge in the Tanahmerah camp at Boven Digoel c.1928

When hundreds of prisoners were released in the early 1930s, Salim was passed over. In 1935, his cousin Sutan Sjahrir was exiled to the camp along with Mohammad Hatta; Salim was part of a welcoming party who greeted them. Hatta brought fifteen boxes of books with him. Salim and other inmates visited him regularly to borrow the books.

Salim converted to Catholicism on 26 December 1942 after long discussions with a priest, Father Meuwese.

=== Release from Digoel and emigration ===
Boven-Digoel was so geographically remote that it was unaffected by the Japanese invasion of the Dutch East Indies. It was only in 1943, with rumours of a possible Japanese landing at nearby Merauke, that authorities decided to evacuate most of the remaining detainees to Australia. Salim was among them; he later said that he saw no alternative but to collaborate with the Dutch and evacuate. However, when in Australia many of the former detainees were recruited to contribute to the war effort through the Association for a New Indonesia (SIBAR, Serikat Indonesia Baroe), Salim did not participate.

After the end of the war and Indonesian independence, Salim emigrated to the Netherlands. This was partly due to ongoing health problems relating to malaria and partly for his safety. He settled in Rijswijk, South Holland and worked at the Indonesian embassy in The Hague. By chance, he encountered the ex-Digoel camp doctor Schoonheyt, who was again working as a doctor there after being interned in Surinam during the Second World War. Schoonheyt became Salim's doctor.

Salim was unable to retire as he was not Dutch, and his Indonesian pension was too small to live on. By the time of the Transition to the New Order in Indonesia in the late 1960s, communists became targets of the Suharto regime and Salim had no option of returning there. For years, Salim pursued the Dutch government for compensation for the fifteen years he spent imprisoned without charge; he received the support of parliamentarians like Political Party of Radicals representative Henk Waltmans, but to no avail. Officials admitted that the rules did not technically forbid compensation for Digoel internees, but he finally received a formal rejection in May 1977.

By the 1960s and 1970s, Schoonheyt regretted his defense of the camp in the 1930s and his embrace of the fascist National Socialist Movement (Netherlands); he signed over the copyright on his own book about Digoel to Salim, who made use of it when writing his memoir. But Salim still regularly faced denialism about the harsh conditions of the camp; many Dutch people denied that it had happened at all or that brutal conditions were imposed on people who had not committed crimes.

Salim died in The Hague on 10 March 1985 at 82 years old. He was buried in the Eikelenburg cemetery in Rijswijk.
