= Jodensavanne internment camp =

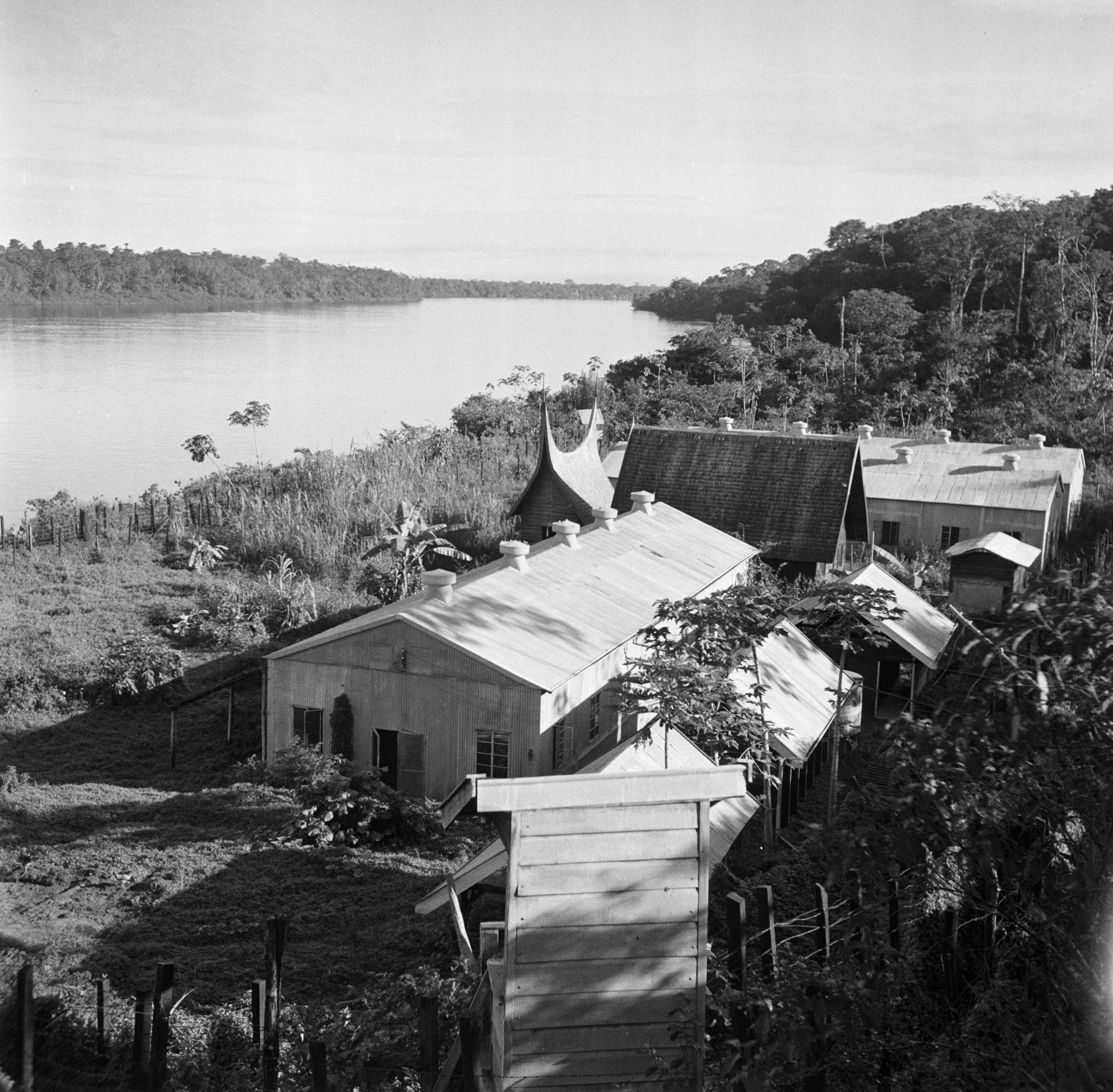
- The site of the Jodensavanne camp in 1947

- Location within Suriname

General information
- Location: Redi Doti, Para District, Suriname
- Coordinates: 5.4263°N 54.9835°W

Jodensavanne (Dutch: Kamp Jodensavanne) was a Dutch internment camp for political prisoners from the Dutch East Indies operated in Surinam during World War II (from 1942 to 1946). The camp was named after a nearby, long-abandoned Jewish colony, Jodensavanne.

Although the camp was intended to imprison so-called "irreconcilable" German sympathizers from the Dutch East Indies, including supporters of the Dutch NSB and the Nazi Party, roughly a quarter of the prisoners apparently were not supporters of those parties; these included Indonesian nationalists and others. Among the most famous prisoners of the camp were Ernest Douwes Dekker, an Indonesian nationalist, L. J. A. Schoonheyt, a government doctor in the Indies who had become a NSB supporter, and Lo Hartog van Banda, a Dutch cartoonist who had been a Conscientious objector.

Eight people died in the camp during its existence, including two who were shot to death by marines while in handcuffs, which led to a government investigation in 1949–50.

== History ==
=== Establishment ===
Since the late 1920s Dutch colonial authorities had experimented with building remote internment camps in the Dutch East Indies for members of banned political parties, most notably the Boven-Digoel concentration camp located near present-day Merauke, Indonesia, where they interned members of the Indonesian Communist Party and other nationalists. The internees in that camp were rarely charged with a crime, but were rather exiled due to the special powers of the Governor-General of the Dutch East Indies (called exorbitante rechten) which allowed disruptive political figures to be exiled or detained in remote areas.

On May 10, 1940, the day of the German invasion of the Netherlands, authorities in the Dutch East Indies enacted martial law and carried out mass arrests of German nationals and supposed German sympathizers living there, including mostly Europeans of German, Hungarian, Czech, and Italian origin, as well as some Dutch with German surnames. Until May 10, the NSB had not been illegal in the Indies, and it was only through the wartime martial law that they were now able to be detained indefinitely without charges. One of these prisoners, Dr. Schoonheyt, had actually been the camp doctor at Boven-Digoel and published a well-known book about it, before becoming a high-profile NSB supporter. These prisoners were initially detained on Onrust Island, Ngawi, and other sites in East Java; none faced trial or were charged with any crimes. After the Netherlands declared war on Japan in 1941, the Indies government found that the Indies was no longer a secure place to imprison them. They exiled roughly two thousand German nationals to India and Siam. In the case of Dutch citizens, they decided to exile the more "irreconcilable" among them to Surinam. The Indies Governor General Alidius Tjarda van Starkenborgh Stachouwer sent a request to Surinam Governor Johannes Kielstra, who had already interned NSB members in Surinam, and a plan to ship the Indies internees was accepted. These 146 "irreconcilables" were put aboard the ship Tjisedané in Surabaya in January 1942 and arrived in Paramaribo, Surinam on March 21, 1942. Because there were delays in construction of the Jodensavanne camp, the internees spent six months at Fort Nieuw-Amsterdam.

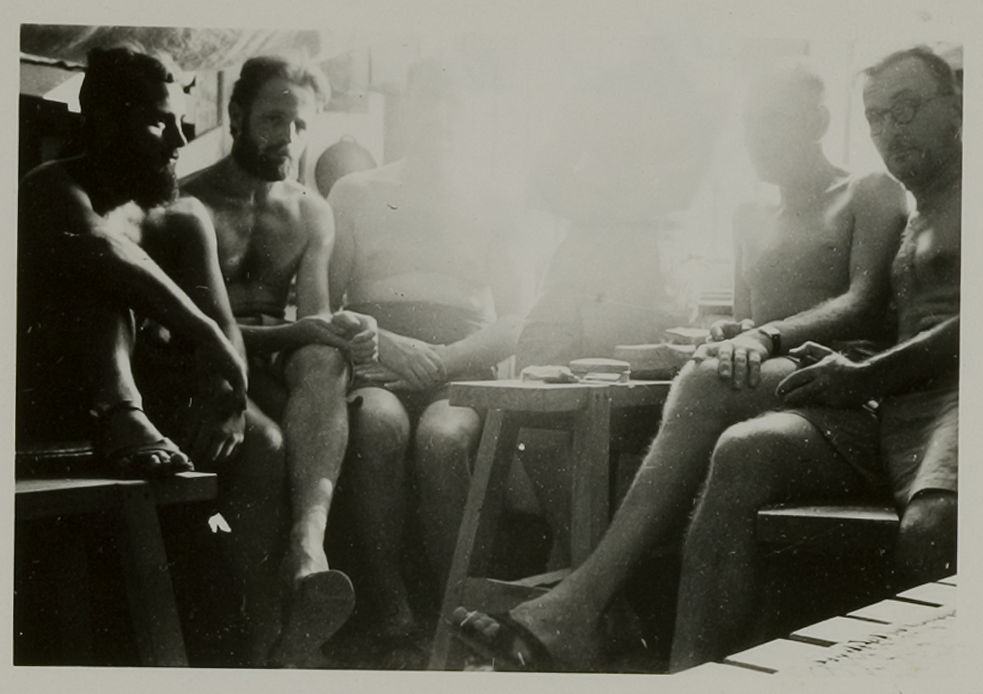
A group of Indies Europeans imprisoned in Jodensavanne, exact date unknown

The camp site which was prepared for them in Surinam was named after the nearby ruins of an abandoned 17th century Jewish settlement, Jodensavanne. Among the officers put in charge were the first camp commander G. Gebuys, camp commander Lieutenant Roos, Captain H. Mouwen, Navy Commander A. C. H. Kuyck, and Troop Commander Colonel Johannes Kroese Meijer, who was later decorated for his wartime service and became a major-general in the Royal Netherlands Indies Army after his time at the camp. Other camps in the area included Copieweg, was also set up for German citizens in Surinam and later for contentious objectors from South Africa and a few Surninam opposition figures, and also camps on the island of Bonaire which were set up for Germans detained in the Antilles.

=== Active period (1942–1946) ===
Upon arriving in the camp, internees were immediately put to work in hard labour in a "green hell", denied medication for dysentery, and subjected to degrading hazing tactics, despite not having been charged with any crime. The prisoners were considered traitors for their support for the NSB and Nazi Germany, and therefore the guards treated them mercilessly. The first camp commander, Gebuys, was later said to have told prisoners that they would only be sent to hospital if they died. And the internees were regularly beaten with clubs or had their hands and feet shackled together. Van Banda, the future cartoonist, at times refused his work detail and would spend months in solitary confinement. Two other prisoners went on hunger strike and died as a result.

A hand-drawn map of the camp layout from 1946 (KITLV)

On November 7, 1942, two of the prisoners were killed by marines following an escape attempt. The two killed were L. K. A. Raedt van Oldenbarnevelt and L. A. J. Van Poelje, who were both NSB members. Two other prisoners, C. J. Kraak and J. E. Stuhlemeyer, would have been shot as well if the gun had not misfired. It later came out in the 1949 investigation that they had escaped to a nearby Indigenous village called Casipoera on November 4, but had already been arrested and were in custody for three days when they were tortured and then killed on the direct order of Colonel Meijer.

During the years of operation, the detainees were assigned to three general work details: fishing, wood-clearing, and the operation of the camp's boats. According to some accounts, prisoners were also tasked with clearing Jewish grave sites in the former settlement of Jodensavanne; according to Kraak they were ordered to loot the graves for valuables.

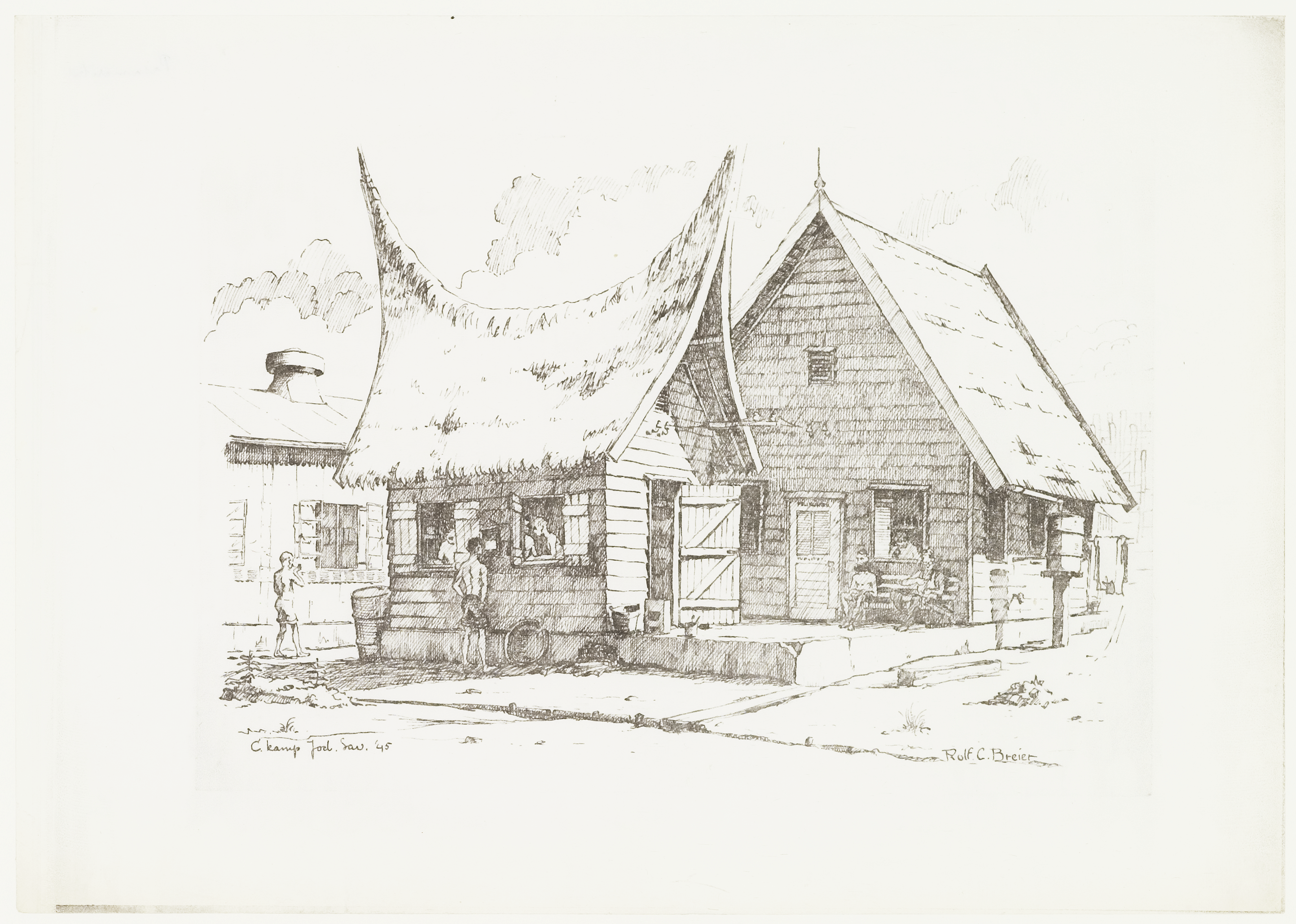
Illustration of Jodensavanne camp buildings by Rolf C. Breier

The detainees were not immediately released upon the liberation of the Netherlands in May 1945. In early 1946, the colonial government claimed that the delay was because of a lack of available ships to transport the internees out of the camp. Newspapers in Surinam even feared that the Netherlands was considering keeping the camp open and turning Surinam into a penal colony for Nazi collaborators and other undesirables. While they were still imprisoned, the camp started to fall into disrepair, such as a broken generator which meant that the buildings had no lights for some time in March 1946. It was only on July 15, 1946, that they were finally released.

=== Aftermath ===
Ernest Douwes Dekker returned to Indonesia in 1947, which was then in the middle of its conflict to gain independence from the Netherlands. He would later become a member of parliament and notable intellectual of the early independence era. Lo Hartog van Banda returned to The Hague where he became well known as a cartoonist. In 1950, some former European civil servants from the Indies who had been interned in the camp during the war, including Dr. Schoonheyt, were allowed have their records cleared and become civil servants again in the Overseas Service. However, many continued to face the stigma of having been interned as traitors and had difficulty finding work.

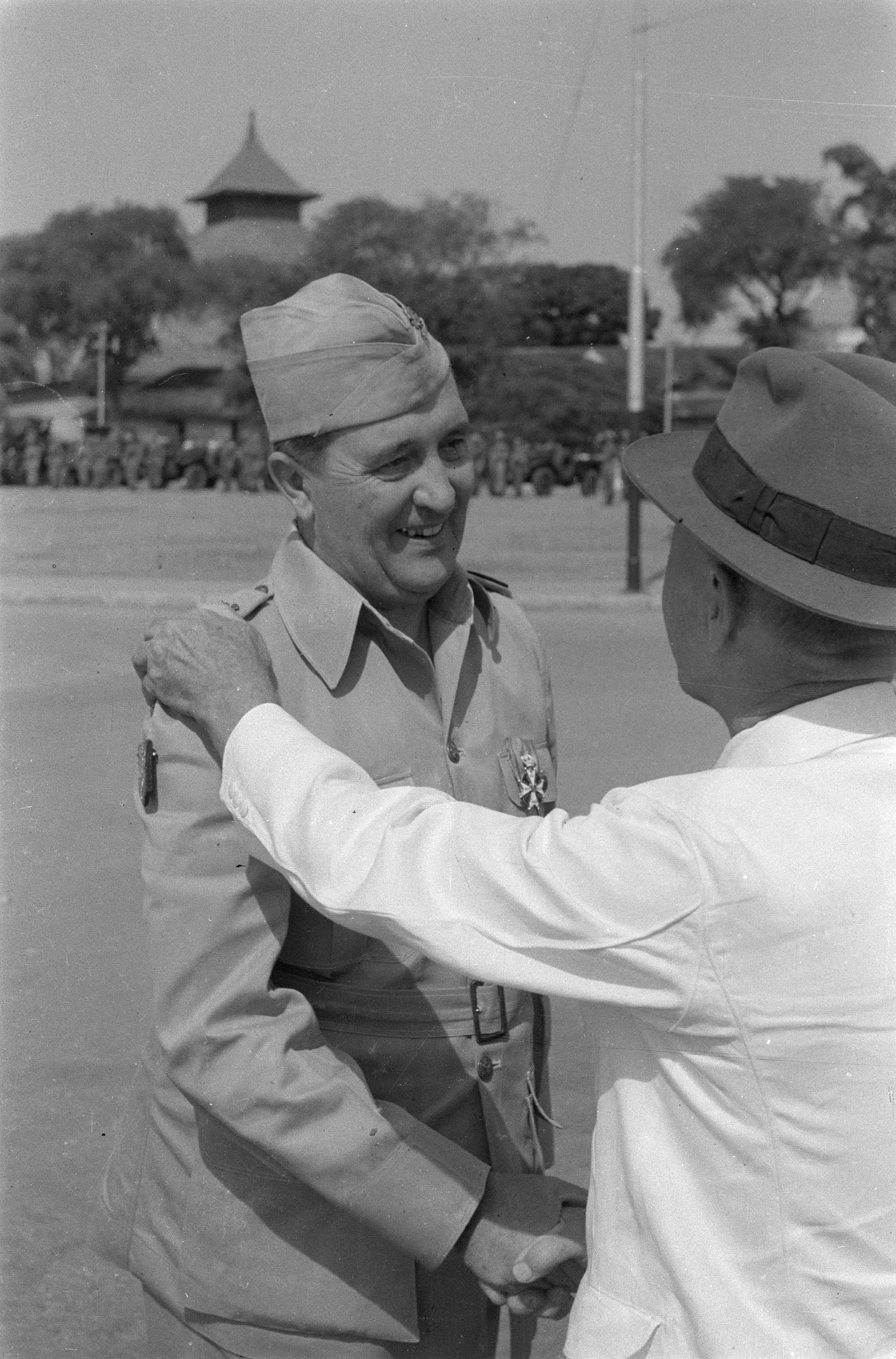
J.K. Meijer being awarded the Military Order of William in Semarang, Indonesia, 1948

In 1949, an investigation was launched into the shooting death of the two prisoners Raedt van Oldenbarnevelt and Van Poelje; in particular, the widow of Raedt van Oldenbarnevelt had been very vocal in criticizing the Netherlands and Surinam governments for not investigating the facts of what had happened. The bodies of the two prisoners were exhumed for examination. The presiding Attorney General Grunberg found that the prisoners had not been shot while escaping, but were in handcuffs and were executed in custody. Grunberg initially thought that the responsible officer Meijer would be charged with incitement to murder and that the marines who had pulled the trigger might be charged with murder or manslaughter. Since the marines had dumped Raedt van Oldenbarnevelt, who had survived for a few hours after the shooting, at the steps of the nearest hospital, there were a number of witnesses outside of the camp guard ranks. In the course of the investigation 500 guilders were paid to the surviving internees. However, the commanding officer Meijer was never charged, and was in fact awarded the Military Order of William and later promoted. The matter became a national news story in the Netherlands again in 1972, with more attention given to Meijer, but again he was not charged in connection with the incident. It was not until 1994 that Minister Joris Voorhoeve apologized to the families of the deceased.
