= Louis Johan Alexander Schoonheyt =

Dutch doctor and political prisoner

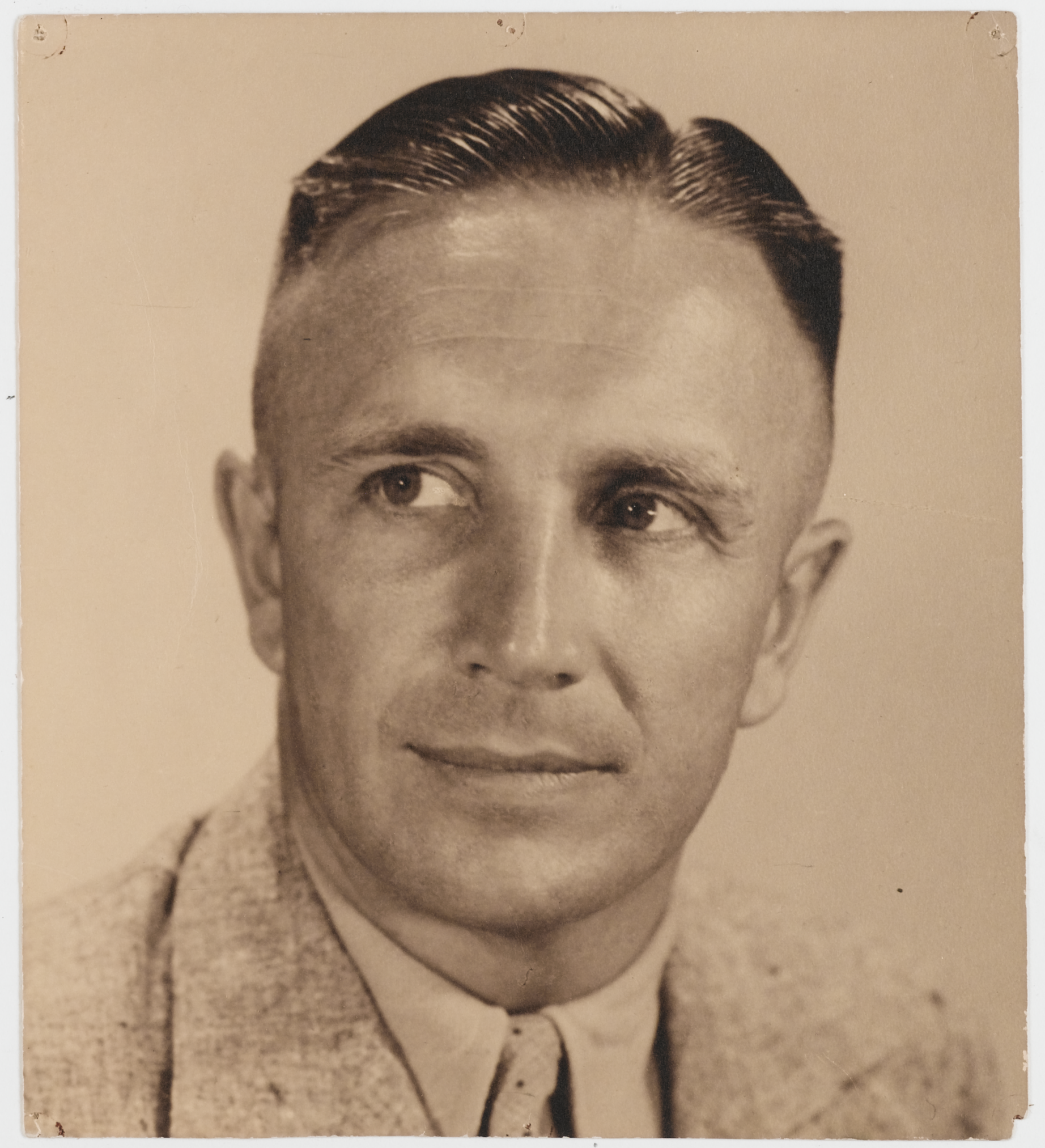
L. J. A. Schoonheyt in the late 1940s

Louis Johan Alexander Schoonheyt (1903-1986), commonly known as L. J. A. Schoonheyt, was a Dutch medical doctor, writer, and supporter of the National Socialist Movement in the Netherlands before World War II. From 1935 to 1936 he was the camp doctor at the Boven-Digoel concentration camp in New Guinea, Dutch East Indies, and is mostly known today for the book he wrote about his experiences there, Boven-Digoel: Het land van communisten en kannibalen (1936). His praise for the conditions in the camp earned him the ire of the internees, Indonesian nationalists, and Dutch human rights advocates; E. du Perron called him a 'colonial bandit', while many internees burned his book after reading it in the camp.

During World War II he was imprisoned by the Dutch in Jodensavanne internment camp in Surinam because of his perceived sympathies for Nazi Germany. After the war ended he petitioned the government to be rehabilitated, which was granted in 1949.

== Biography ==
=== Early life ===
Schoonheyt was born in Magetan Regency, Central Java, Dutch East Indies, on June 8, 1903. His father, Louis Henri Eduard Schoonheijt, was Assistant Resident of Kulon Progo Regency, and his mother was named Christina van Harencarspell. Before World War I he was sent to study in Europe and graduated from the Hogere Burger School (Haarlem) in 1921. He enrolled at the University of Amsterdam in 1923, studying medicine. He graduated from his doctorate in 1928. At the start of 1931 he enrolled as a medical officer in the Royal Netherlands Indies Army (KNIL) in Amsterdam, and sailed to Batavia in May of that year.

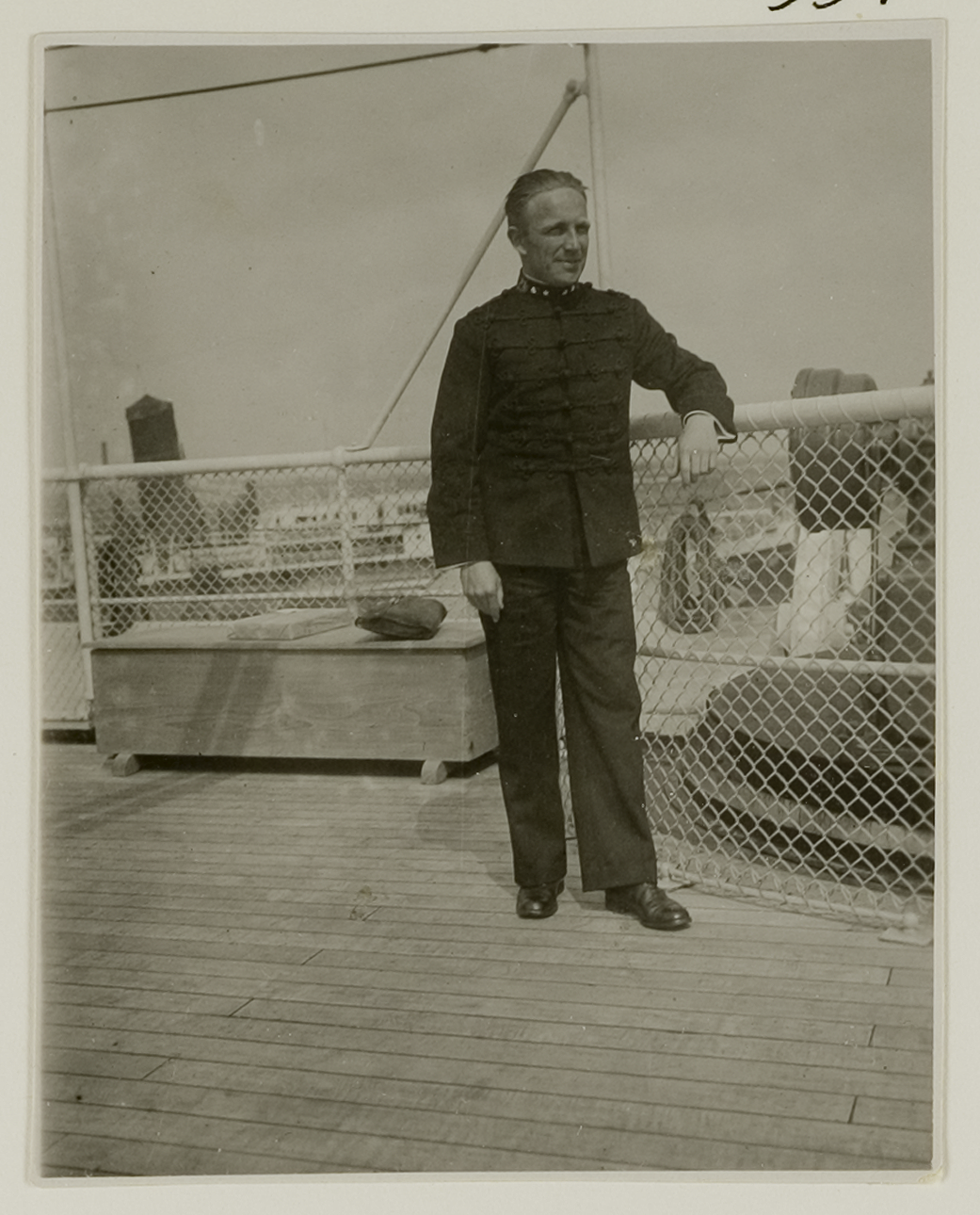
Schoonheyt in his KNIL uniform aboard a ship in 1931 (KITLV)

=== Dutch East Indies ===
Upon arriving in Batavia in 1931, Schoonheyt was first assigned to a post in Tanah Abang. He soon became involved in campaigns to eradicate Malaria, and traveled with the northern light infantry of KNIL in more remote parts of the Indies, spending 1932 and 1933 working as a medic in the area around Boven Digoel. He started to style himself an expert on conditions in Digoel and wrote articles and gave lectures about it in 1933 and 1934, many of which praised the camp and portrayed the internees as deeply flawed and deserving of punishment. He got married in Weltevreden in December 1934. He was also appointed head assistant at the Medical college in Batavia during this time. It was in 1935 that he was made camp doctor at the Wilhelmina Hospital at the Boven-Digoel concentration camp. He continued to send written accounts of his time there to newspapers and magazines in the Indies and in the Netherlands, accompanied by his photographs. While working at the camp he was obsessed with creating an antiseptic environment which would reduce the spread of Malaria and other diseases. He also conducted "Anthropological" and physical research on the internees and on local Papuans. Meanwhile he praised conditions in the camp as being better than the prisoners deserved, noting the musical orchestras, soccer teams, and other hobbies they could engage in.

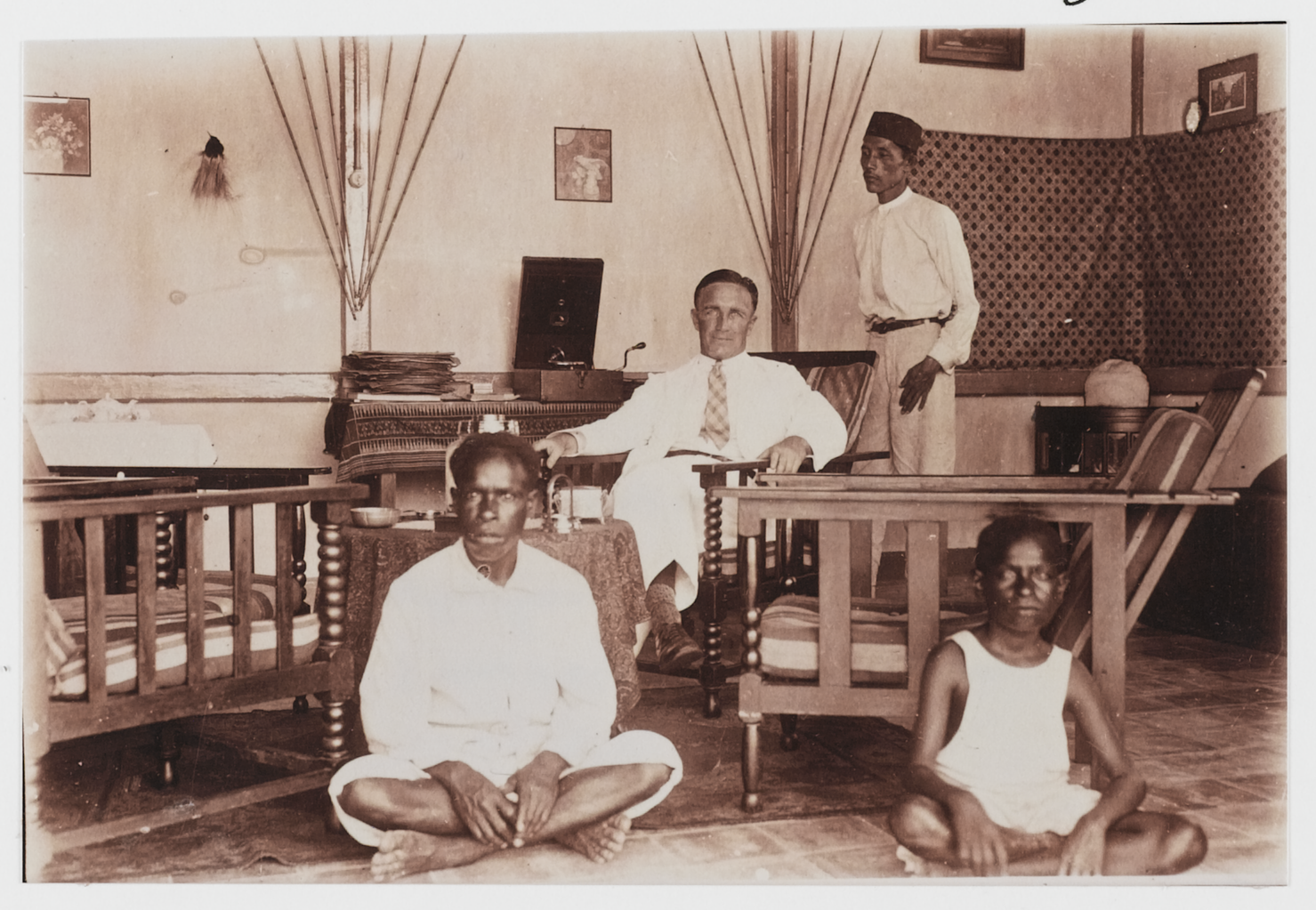
Schoonheyt in his office at the Tanahmerah camp with a camp prisoner and two Papuans, c.1935 (KITLV)

After finishing his tour of duty in the camp, Schoonheyt went on a speaking tour in the Indies and in the Netherlands. He also published a book about his experiences in Digoel in 1936, titled Boven-Digoel: het land van communisten en kannibalen. As a true believer in the Dutch colonial mission, he portrayed the camp as necessary and attempted to give it a positive spin. He dedicated the book to Theo Becking, a former KNIL Captain who had built Digoel and been its first administrator. Copies were sent to the internees in the camp; many of them became enraged by its portrayal, and burned or threw out copies, not least because the prisoners themselves were portrayed as pathological. It sold very well, and a second edition was released in 1940.

After leaving Digoel, he returned to Batavia and was appointed the chief doctor at Tanjung Priok, where he remained until 1940. At around that time, in 1936, he became a member and prominent donor of the National Socialist Movement in the Netherlands party (NSB), a movement which was becoming increasingly fashionable in Batavia after 1935; leaders of the party from Europe including Anton Mussert and Gerrit van Duyl visited Java. Schoonheyt became a committed member, even attending a speech by Adolf Hitler while in Europe. While in the Netherlands in 1938 he gave a number of lectures about Digoel, defending it and rallying supporters of the NSB and of a strong colonial policy to ignore calls for its abolition. A former Digoel prisoner, Soekaesih, cowrote a pamphlet attacking his claims about conditions there.

=== World war II internment ===
On May 10, 1940, the day of the German invasion of the Netherlands, authorities in the Dutch East Indies enacted martial law and carried out mass arrests of German nationals and supposed German sympathizers living there, including NSB members such as Schoonheyt. Schoonheyt and other detainees were first sent to the Cipinang Prison in Batavia. They were then sent to Onrust Island, a former Quarantine island where an improvised concentration camp had been built; Schoonheyt's wife and child also joined him there. They were then moved once again to a new camp in Ngawi Regency. He and some other NSB members managed to escape from Ngawi in early 1941 but were arrested a few days later; they had bought new clothes, taken the train across Java and were hiding out in a Chinese house in Batavia. Their final holding place in the Indies was at another camp in Ambarawa, in Central Java.

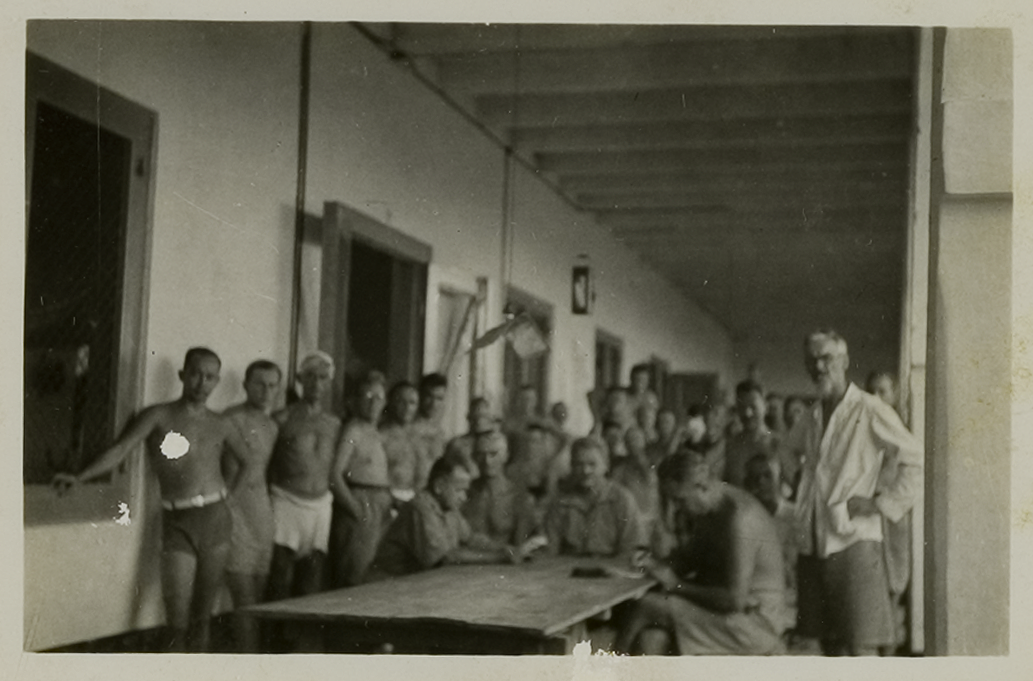
Schoonheyt and fellow interned Europeans in Ngawi, c.1940 (KITLV)

After the Netherlands declared war on Japan in 1941, the Indies government found that the Indies was no longer a secure place to imprison them. They exiled roughly two thousand German nationals to India and Siam and sent Dutch citizens to Surinam, a Dutch colony in South America. Those supposedly "irreconcilable" German sympathizers with Dutch citizenship, including Schoonheyt, were put aboard the ship Tjisedané in Surabaya in January 1942 and arrived in Paramaribo, Surinam on March 21, 1942. Schoonheyt later complained about the voyage from Java to Suriname locked in a cage in the hold of the ship with other prisoners.

A new camp, Jodensavanne internment camp, was built for these prisoners in a remote location in the colony near the ruins of a former Jewish plantation village called Jodensavanne. Because they were considered traitors, the internees were subjected to harsh treatment, torture, and hard labour. While interned there, Schoonheyt occasionally acted as doctor for the other internees, including for Captain Becking, the first camp commander of Boven-Digoel who had also been interned as an NSB member. He also tried to escape in November 1942, but because the terrain was so unfamiliar to him he was recaptured when he had only walked a few kilometers.

=== Postwar ===
The Jodensavanne detainees were not immediately released upon the liberation of the Netherlands in May 1945. In early 1946, the colonial government claimed that the delay was because of a lack of available ships to transport the internees out of the camp. After the war Schoonheyt and other Jodensavanne detainees who had been government employees before the war petitioned for the right to be rehabilitated and to reenter the civil service. Schoonheyt was allowed to leave Surinam and returned to the Netherlands in 1947. It was unclear to Dutch officials whether he was entitled to compensation or reinstatement and the case dragged on for some time. In late 1949 he was fully rehabilitated and became a General practitioner in Scheveningen and in The Hague. There he renounced his prewar views, and even befriended a former Digoel internee who now lived in the Netherlands, I. F. M. Salim. Schoonheyt eventually signed over the rights to his 1936 book to Salim, who used some of the material from it in his own book.

In 1962 Schoonheyt was on vacation in Germany when he was involved in a car accident, becoming partially paralyzed in one arm. He was angry that the insurance company declared him "15 to 20 percent disabled" and became a campaigner to improve treatment for Dutch car accident victims. He led a group of victims of traffic accidents (Dutch: Werkgroep der Verkeersslachtoffers). Among their demands were that medical inspections should be made by third-party doctors, not ones handpicked by insurance companies, and that victims should not have to prove that they were healthy before their accident.

In the 1970s a Dutch writer named Anthony van Kampen who had visited Boven-Digoel became interested in Schoonheyt's personal history and wrote a book about him titled Een kwestie van macht: het bewogen leven van de arts dr. L.J.A. Schoonheyt in het voormalige Nederlandsch-Indië, Nieuw-Guinea, Suriname en Nederland (1975). Van Kampen was very sympathetic to Schoonheyt and downplayed his fascist beliefs, portraying him as a victim of an abusive and arbitrary government.

Schoonheyt died on July 26, 1986. His papers were donated to the Royal Netherlands Institute of Southeast Asian and Caribbean Studies (KITLV).
