= De Banten-bode =

De Banten-bode ("The Banten Messenger") was a Dutch-language newspaper published in Serang, Dutch Indies (present-day Indonesia). De Banten-bode was published between 1924 and 1938, and possibly later.
