= Onrust Island =

Indonesian island

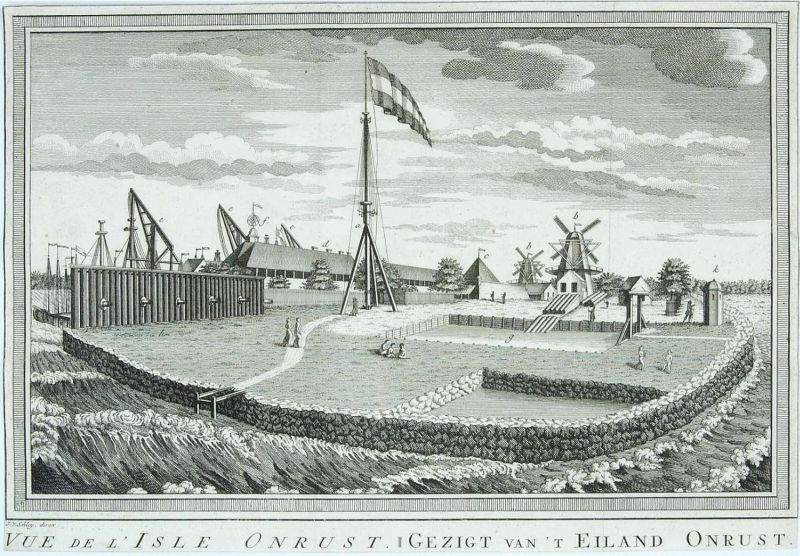
- A Dutch engraving of the island, c. 1765

- Location within Indonesia

Geography
- Location: South East Asia
- Coordinates: 6.033°S 106.733°E
- Area: 3.5 km^{2} (1.4 sq mi)
- Indonesia

Onrust Island, also known as Pulau Onrust or Pulau Kapal (ship island), is an Indonesian island off the coast of Jakarta. It measures about 3.5 km^{2} (1.4 sq mi) and is part of the Thousand Islands.

== History ==
=== Before the colonial period ===
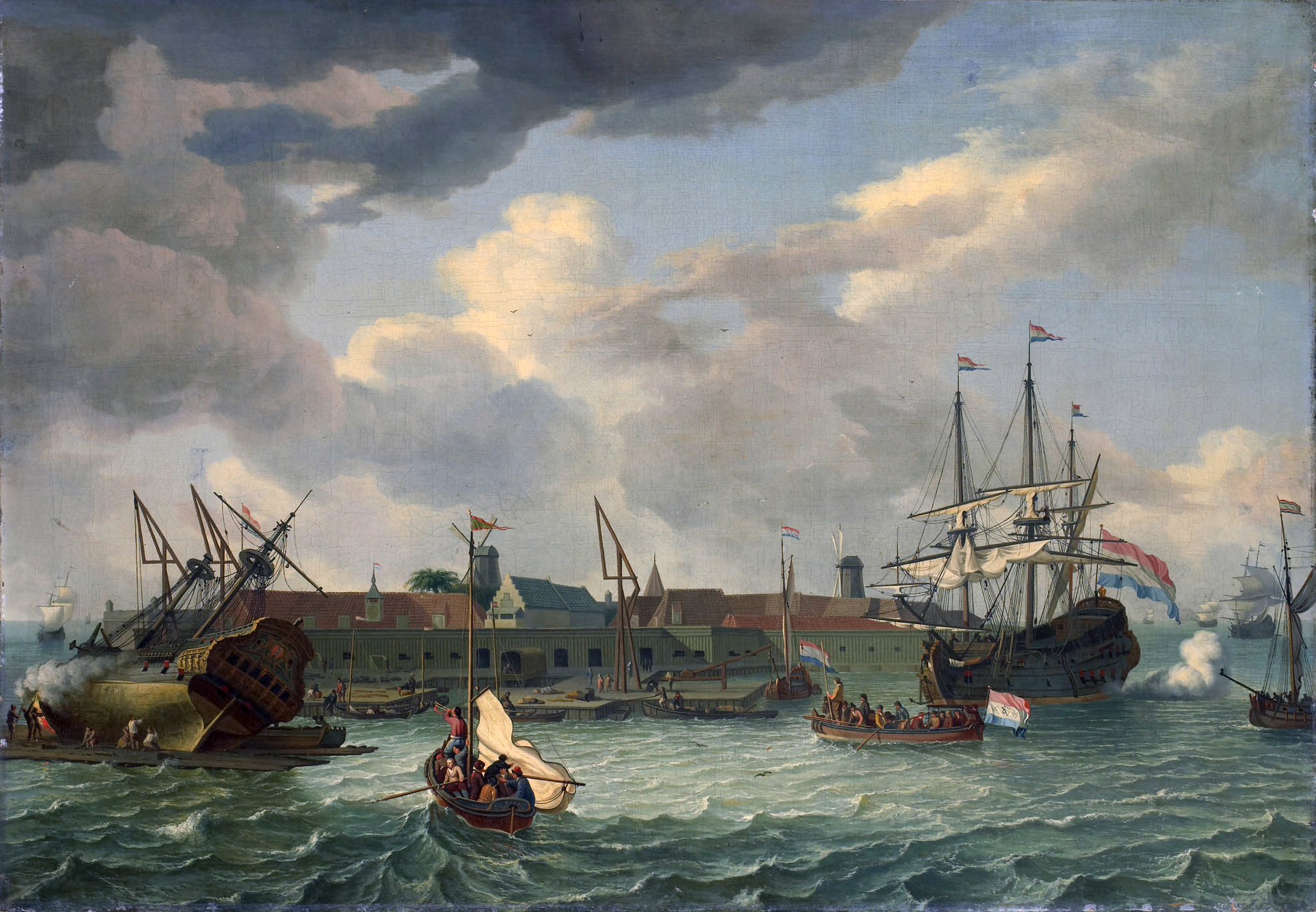
The island Onrust near Batavia (Nederlands-Indië) (Abraham Storck, 1699

Shortly before the colonial period Jakarta Bay was disputed between the Sunda Kingdom and the rising Banten Sultanate. In 1527 the Demak Sultanate conquered the Sunda port Sunda Kelapa and renamed it Jayakarta. Later it became a fiefdom of the Banten Sultanate.

=== The Dutch East India Company ===
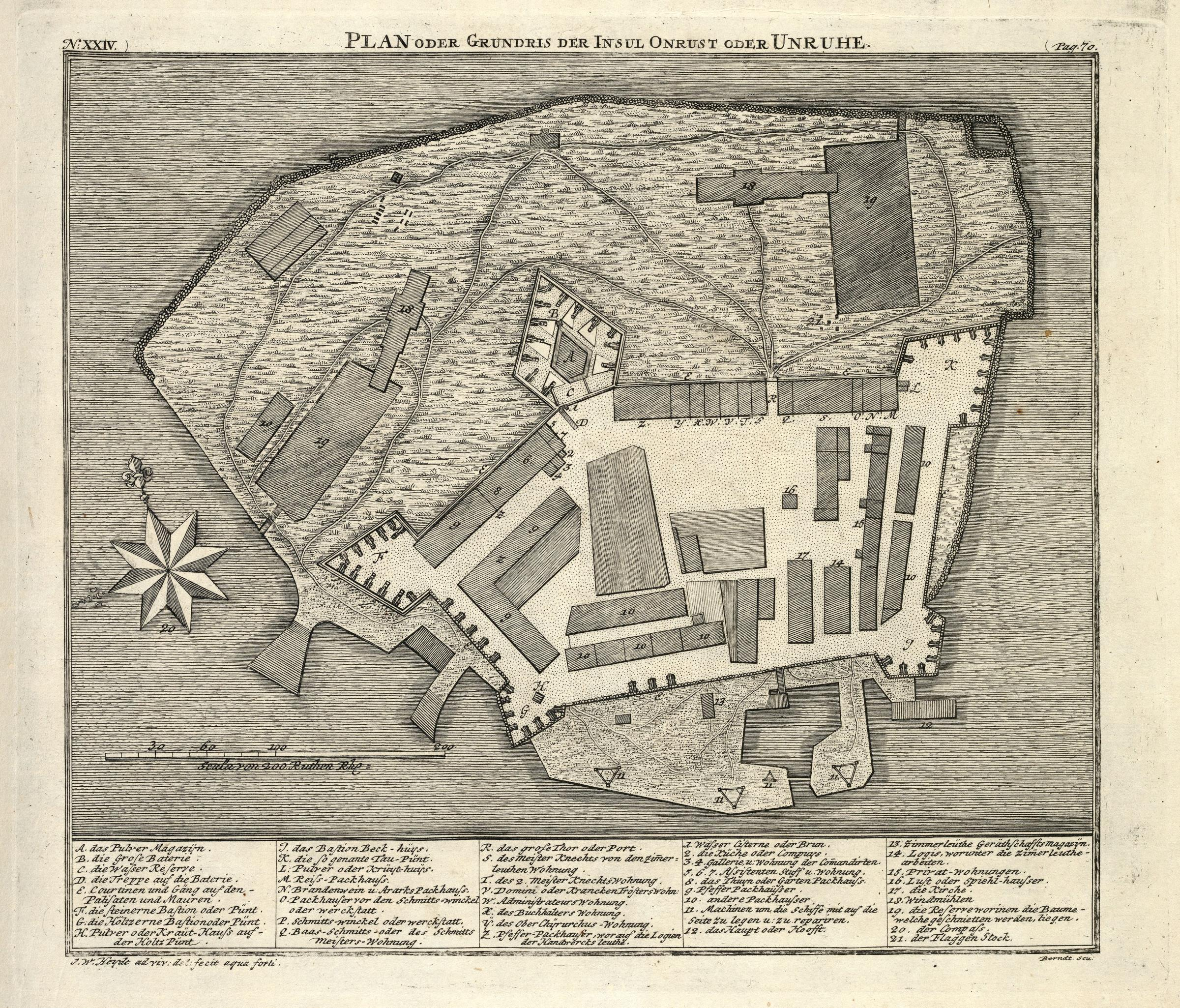
Onrust c. 1744

The Dutch presence in the area started when the Dutch East India Company (VOC) established a trading post in Jakarta. In order to service her ships, the VOC established a naval base at Onrust Island. Construction began in 1613. In 1615, a shipyard and a small warehouse were established, and in 1618 fortification started. In a local war with native states, Jan Pieterszoon Coen conquered Jakarta in 1619. Jakarta was renamed Batavia and became the capital of the Dutch East Indies.

For the naval needs of the VOC, it did not make a big difference. While ships were able to anchor before Jakarta, they could not reach the shore there. At Onrust Island they could reach up to the shore to get careened. Because of the massive naval needs of the VOC Onrust developed into a small town protected by a fortress of five bastions.

Of course, the town had houses and warehouses, but it also had a gunpowder magazine, a storage for water transported from Batavia, general warehouses, and a lot of warehouses specifically meant to store pepper. Specific to the shipyard were the reservoirs for trees. Sawing windmills processed these trees to make planks for the shipyards. There was also a smithy that served the shipyard. Near the waterfront there were special installations to easily pull ships on their side. Sometimes ships for local use were built at the island. The VOC employees were only allowed to leave the island two times a year.

=== State Naval Base ===
After the dissolution of the Dutch East India Company in 1799, the Batavian Republic took over the management of the Dutch East Indies. In 1800, a Royal Navy squadron under Captain Henry Lidgbird Ball, consisting of HMS Daedalus, HMS Sybille, HMS Centurion and HMS Braave, entered the area. Ball's squadron seized five Dutch armed vessels, destroyed 22 other vessels and destroyed all the facilities on Onrust Island before withdrawing. After the British departed, the Dutch rebuilt the facilities on Onrust Island, completing the work in 1806. However, a second British attack in the same year led by Admiral Edward Pellew again destroyed the facilities on the island. When the British occupied Batavia in 1811, they repaired the facilities on Onrust Island prior to handing over the Dutch East Indies to the Netherlands in 1816.

From 1823 to 1825, Governor-General Godert van der Capellen established a naval base at Onrust. In 1841, the construction of a graving dock started. The attempt lasted till 1844, when so many lives had been lost to malaria that the attempt was stopped. On 19 June 1845, Rear-Admiral Engelbertus Batavus van den Bosch, the new commander of the navy in the East Indies arrived at Batavia. One of the first things Van den Bosch did was to perform a thorough investigation of the maritime bases and establishments. The conclusions were not good. Urgent improvements were required because many ships had to be repaired for the upcoming Dutch intervention in northern Bali (1846). Governor-General Jan Jacob Rochussen (1845–1851) was initially strongly opposed to plans to develop Onrust as a naval station because it would make the island a site of great strategic value. Only after the defense policy had changed was Onrust developed further.

By 1847, work on the graving dock had been restarted. Van den Bosch also secured funds to repair the careening facility and the slipway that could be used to pull ships out of the water. A stone house was built for the officers of ships that were repaired, as well as a new barracks building for the garrison. Furthermore, a medical center was built, and the housing for the forced laborers was improved. A new shear legs was made, the optical telegraph was repaired and the barracks for sailors was improved. Except for the graving dock all this was complete before Van den Bosch left the East Indies in April 1848.

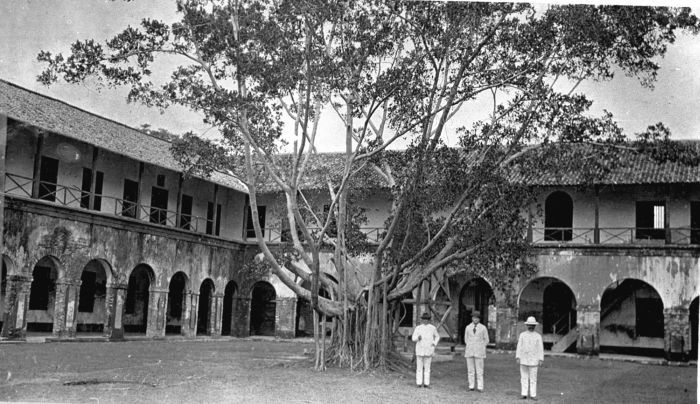
Inner court of the Dutch barracks 1912

Onrust now became a good place for commercial ships to dock, and so they did. Soon a massive coaling station was established at nearby Kuiper Island (Cipir Kahyangan) which attracted even more traffic. A plan by Van den Bosch to connect and fortify Onrust, Kuiper, Purmerend and Kerkhof islands did not make it. In 1856 Onrust got a wooden dry dock. A description published in 1868 stated Onrust was able to repair all steam ships and sailing ships. It had a smithy driven by steam power with a steam hammer and all tools required to work iron. The colossal shear legs was visible from afar and the wooden dry dock made a good impression. There was a coal station at Kuiper, and it was brought closer to Onrust by a Bamboo bridge. On Onrust there was a big round Martello-like tower with heavy pivot guns. Fresh supplies were shipped from Batavia on a daily basis. A water factory provided drinking water. There was also an artesian aquifer in the center of the island, but its water was warm and unsuitable to drink because of the salt it contained. Most houses collected rainwater. There was a daily market at Onrust for vegetables, fruits, meat poultry etc. Most of the local population lived in bamboo houses, but these were getting replaced by stone ones. There were about 100 Europeans with their families, 80 mostly local soldiers; furthermore, there were local laborers, Javanese and Chinese, all 1,500 people and about 300 forced laborers.

On 4 November 1869, the iron Onrust Dock of 3,000 tons arrived at Onrust. It started a period wherein Onrust was the main naval repair shipyard in the Dutch East Indies. The later arrival of Onrust Dock of 5,000 tons prolonged this period. However, after the completion of Tanjung Priok in 1886 there was no reason at all to have a naval base at Onrust. In 1886 the naval bases at Onrust Island were abandoned.

=== Onrust fortified position ===
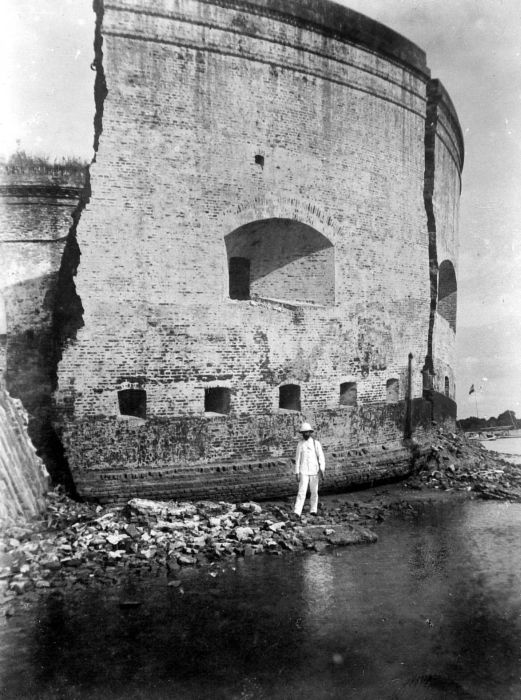
Ruins of the tower on Kelor, showing the outer wall

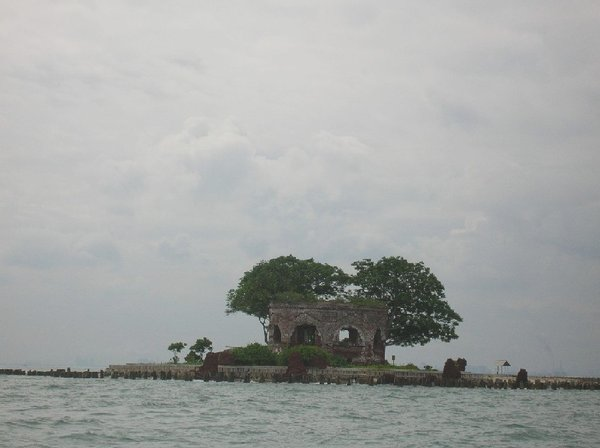
The ruins on Kelor in 2013

In the scare of the revolutions of 1848, the Dutch started to fortify the position of Onrust. Heavy brick Martello-like towers and batteries were soon constructed on Onrust Island, Cipir (Kuiper) Island, Bidadari (Purmerend) Island and Kelor (Kerkhof) Island. The system was criticized almost immediately after construction. The construction date of the towers was 1850–1852. The idea was to place 80-pounder grenade guns on the towers. One of these guns was indeed on trial at Onrust in 1852. Part of the idea was that together the islands would be a safe haven for ships. The grenade gun was very effective against the wooden ships of the time. The range of the grenade gun was such that the passages between the islands were covered by the artillery in the fortresses, and that the fortresses could support each other.

The invention of the rifled gun made the towers obsolete in just a few years after their construction. In 1860 the British government performed an experiment with traditional smooth bore guns and the new rifled gun type on two Martello towers. The one fired on with traditional smooth bore muzzle loading guns was damaged, but still serviceable. The Martello tower fired on by the new rifled guns was, however, quickly destroyed. An unfortunate aspect was that rifled guns also outranged grenade guns. When metal armor was introduced on ships, the brick towers would also be less protected than bombarding ships.

In late 1883 the tower at Onrust had to make place for a canteen, and was blown up with dynamite in order to hasten demolition. The other towers were also demolished. The obvious was to prevent an enemy from taking up a defensive position on the islands that were no longer part of a base. Demolition was generally done by destroying the thick outer wall, which gave the fortresses their defensive strength. The inner part of one of these towers is still standing at Pulau Kelor (ex. Kerkhof Island). It gives a very misleading impression of the time that the towers/fortresses were built.

=== Quarantine station and prison camp ===
In 1911, Onrust Island was turned into a quarantine station for pilgrims returning from the Hajj. The island had the advantage of being completely isolated. Furthermore, it was so small that it was possible to make it malaria-free by the only method known at the time. This was done by filling up all the small ponds and other fresh water instances on the island and by removing most vegetation.

Later a sanatorium for lung diseases was established on the island because of the very much improved health situation. From 1933 it was used to lock up the mutineers of the 1933 mutiny on the HNLMS De Zeven Provinciën (1909). In 1940, German nationals were interned on Onrust.

=== World War II ===
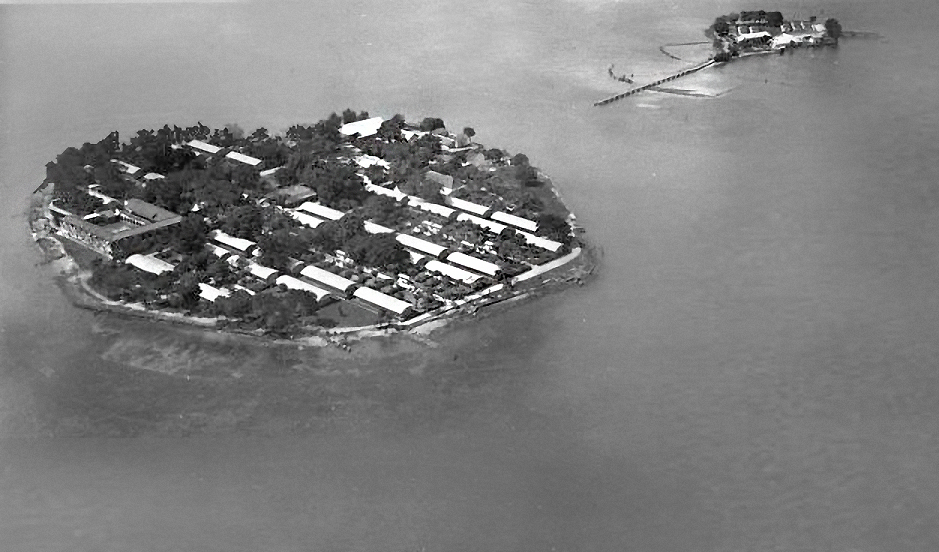
Onrust Island c. 1925

In May 1940, the Netherlands were attacked by Germany. In the Dutch East Indies thousands of Germans, Hungarians, Czechs, Italians, Dutchmen with a German family name, and members of the National Socialist Movement in the Netherlands were arrested and locked up at Onrust and in Ngawai. After war with Japan broke out on 8 December 1941 a small part of these prisoners was evacuated to Suriname. The Japanese also used Onrust as a prison.

=== Post World War II ===
On 23 January 1950, Raymond Westerling attempted the APRA coup d'état. It failed, and most of the APRA military were seized by the Dutch troops that were still on Java. The Dutch military authorities decided to judge these as deserters. They ended up on Onrust. The Indonesian authorities prolonged this tradition when they interned Chris Soumokil (the president of the breakaway Republic of South Maluku). On 12 April 1966 he was shot at Onrust by order of General Suharto.

== Recreation ==
Until 1968, there was massive demolition and retrieval of building materials by residents with the permission of the local police. In 1972 Ali Sadikin, then governor of Jakarta, declared Onrust Island a protected historical site. In 2002, the administration made Onrust and its three neighbors – the islands of Cipir (Dutch: Kuyper), Kelor (Kerkhof) and Bidadari (Purmerend) – an archaeological park. The parc is to protect the artifacts and ruins on the islands and to open them up for visitors. There is one house from the colonial period that is still intact. It is used as the Museum of the Onrust Island. Meanwhile, tourism is developing, especially at Bidadari. This island attracts many day-trip visitors from the nearby metropolis Jakarta, and these also visit Onrust Island.

== Health ==
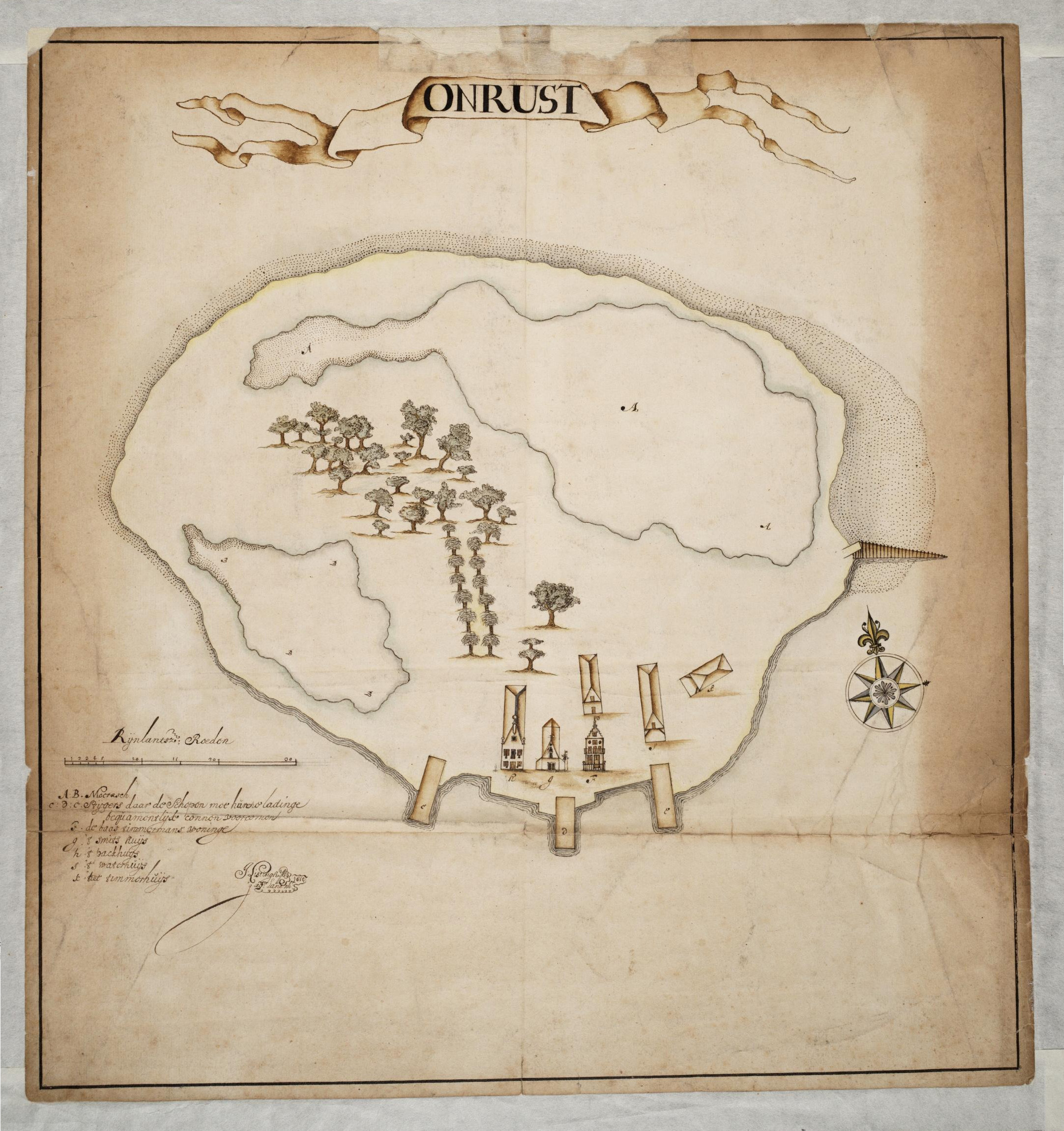
1650 map of Onrust showing massive swamps

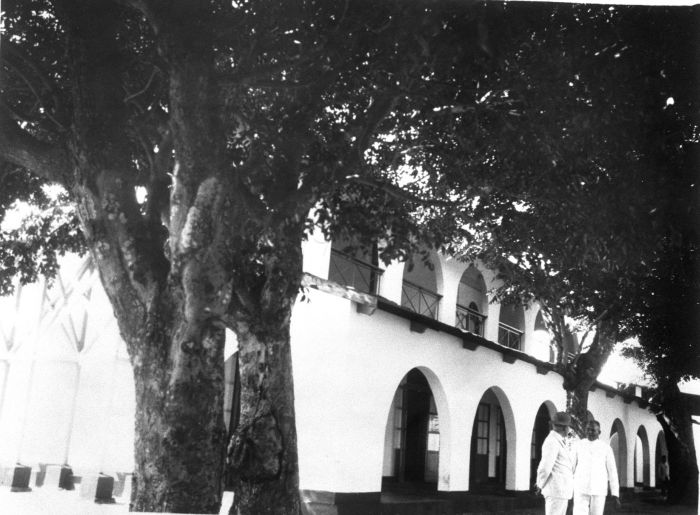
Hospital at Quarantine Island Onrust c 1928

Pulau Onrust had one massive drawback: It was one of the most unhealthy places in the archipelago. The fevers that decimated the crews of the ships that were in repair, were just as mortal to the local inhabitants. There was a time that being sent to Onrust was like a death penalty. By 1680, the tiny population of the island had three doctors. At other times the health conditions of the island were more than sufficient.

By the 1860s, many improvements to the island, and the implementation of hygiene measures created the hope that the worst was over. The local hospital that treated the fevers also drastically reduced the mortality that had previously been heightened by transporting the sick to the mainland. Furthermore, one thought that the general health of people was better, making it more likely that people survived the fever.

The diseases that killed called so many European and other inhabitants of the island were generally blamed on the swamps emitting bad air. Indeed, the word malaria translates as mal (bad) aria (air). Until about 1880, nobody knew that the mosquitos that were so abundant in swamps transferred malaria to humans. People did know that when swamps were turned into agricultural land malaria became less prevalent. Some thought that the coral at Onrust emitted bad airs that were even worse than those coming from the marshes near Batavia. They did arrive at the same conclusions, that when the coral was dried out, or covered by a thick layer of humus, like at Amsterdam Island, the disease became less prevalent.

A gradual but unnoticed disappearance of the swamps at Onrust was probably responsible for the improved health situation. From the 1650s the base became bigger, leaving less room for the swamps. Furthermore, nature reduced the surface of the island on the north side generally reducing the swamps on the northern and western side of the island. In the early twentieth century, malaria on the island was stamped out by filling up all pools and other bodies of water on the island.
