= Catholic Church in Indonesia =

- Gereja Katolik di Indonesia
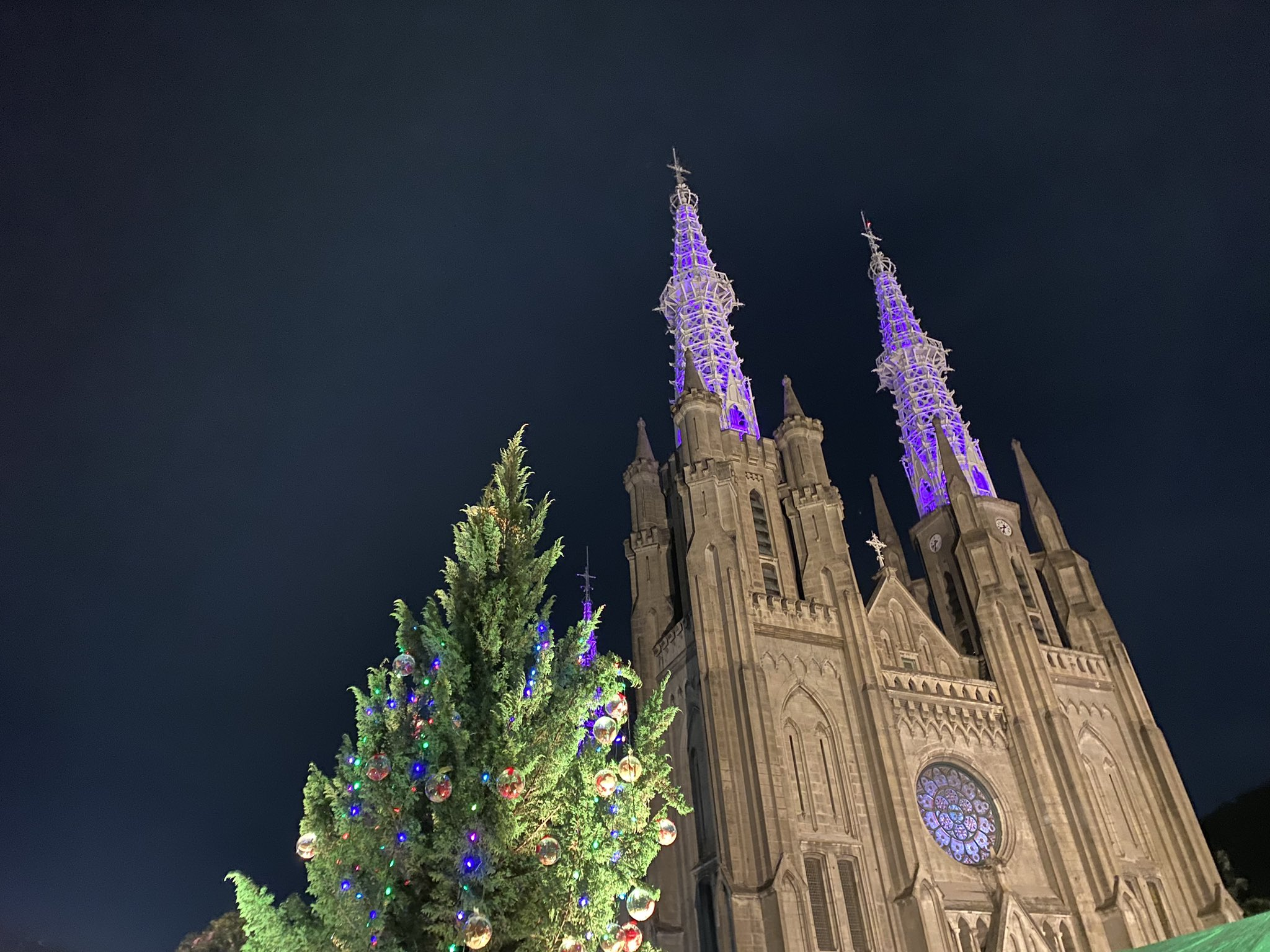
- Jakarta Cathedral
- Type: National polity
- Classification: Catholic
- Orientation: Christianity
- Scripture: Bible
- Theology: Catholic theology
- Governance: Bishops' Conference of Indonesia
- Pope: Leo XIV
- President: Antonius Subianto Bunjamin
- Apostolic Nuncio: Walter Erbì
- Region: Indonesia
- Language: Indonesian, Latin
- Headquarters: Jakarta
- Origin: 1534; Maluku Islands, Portuguese Moluccas
- Official website: Official KWI webpage

Catholics in each district of Indonesia

The Catholic Church in Indonesia (Indonesian: Gereja Katolik di Indonesia) is part of the worldwide Catholic Church, under the spiritual leadership of the pope in Rome. Catholicism is one of the six approved religions in Indonesia, the others being Islam, Protestantism, Hinduism, Buddhism, and Confucianism. According to official figures, Catholics made up 3.12 percent of the population in 2018. The number of Catholics is, therefore, more than 8.3 million. Indonesia is primarily Muslim, but Catholicism is the dominant faith in certain areas of the country.

The Church is organised into one military ordinariate, 10 archdioceses and 28 dioceses, all of which are members of the Indonesian Catholic Bishops Conference (KWI) led now by Bishop Antonius Subianto Bunjamin from the Diocese of Bandung. There are several Catholic religious institutes active in the country including the Jesuits, the Missionaries of the Sacred Heart (MSC) and the Divine Word Missionaries.

Catholicism in Indonesia began with the arrival of the Portuguese in search of the Spice Islands in the 16th century. Currently, East Nusa Tenggara and South Papua province in Indonesia are the only places where Catholicism is the dominant faith of the population, with around 55% and 50% of its population respectively. There are also significant Catholic populations in North Sumatra, West Kalimantan, South Sulawesi, Maluku and Central Java, especially in and around Muntilan.

== History ==
=== Overview ===
In the 14th century, the first Catholic mission that reached Indonesia was led by Italian Franciscan friar Mattiussi. In his book "Travels of Friar Odoric of Pordenone", he visited several places in today's Indonesia: Sumatra, Java, and Banjarmasin in Borneo, between 1318 and 1330. He was sent by the Pope to launch a mission into the Asian interiors. In 1318 he departed from Padua, crossed the Black Sea into Persia and then to Calcutta, Madras, and Sri Lanka. Thence he headed to Nicobar island and Sumatra, before visiting Java and Banjarmasin. He returned to Italy by land through Vietnam, China, and the silkroad to Europe in 1330. The Javanese kingdom mentioned in his record was the Hindu-Buddhist Majapahit kingdom. This mission was a pioneer one, providing the church with some information about Asia. At that time the Catholic church was not yet established in the region, with Hinduism and Buddhism being the religions of the majority of the population.

In the 16th century, the Portuguese sailed east to Asia and eventually captured Malacca in 1511. They came for the spice but Catholic missionaries soon arrived in the region, most notably Francis Xavier who worked in Ambon, Ternate and Morotai (Halmahera) in 1546–1547. Dominican missionaries also converted many in Solor. With the expulsion of Portugal from Ternate in 1574, many Catholics in the northern Moluccas were killed or converted to Islam. Ambon was conquered and occupied by the Dutch East India Company in 1605. Subsequently, the Catholics were forced to convert to Protestantism. The same happened in Manado and the islands of Sangihe-Talaud. In 1613 Solor also fell to the Dutch, and Catholic mission activities declined in Flores and Timor, even though these were still under Portuguese administration.

It was not until 1808 under H.W. Daendels, as governor-general, that Catholics were permitted freedom of worship in the Dutch Indies, though this measure was mainly intended for European Catholics since Daendels ruled under the authority of Napoleonic France. This freedom was consolidated by Thomas Raffles.

From 1835 the Catholic Church was affiliated with the colonial state: clergy received a salary from the colonial government which in turn had the right to reject church appointments. In 1846, clashes over policy led the Dutch authorities to expel all but one of the Catholic priests in the colony. In 1848 there were Catholic churches in only four centres in the colony.

Active mission work resumed in the second half of the 19th century and was concentrated in a few areas. Larantuka in the island of Flores was a particularly important mission field under the Jesuits because the freedom of the Catholic Church was guaranteed there under an 1859 treaty with Portugal, which settled conflicting territorial claims in the region. Bengkulu, Bangka, West Borneo, and the islands south of New Guinea were also important. In other regions, Catholic mission work was banned. Many Batak people in the interior of North Sumatra adopted Catholicism at this time, even though authorities banned Catholic missionaries in other parts of the province. In 1898, a mission program also began in Muntilan, though the first ethnic Javanese priest was not installed until 1926.

After Indonesian independence, the Church grew steadily although the Dutch and other Europeans were expelled. Catholicism and other religions grew phenomenally after the Overthrow of Sukarno in 1965.

=== Portuguese era ===
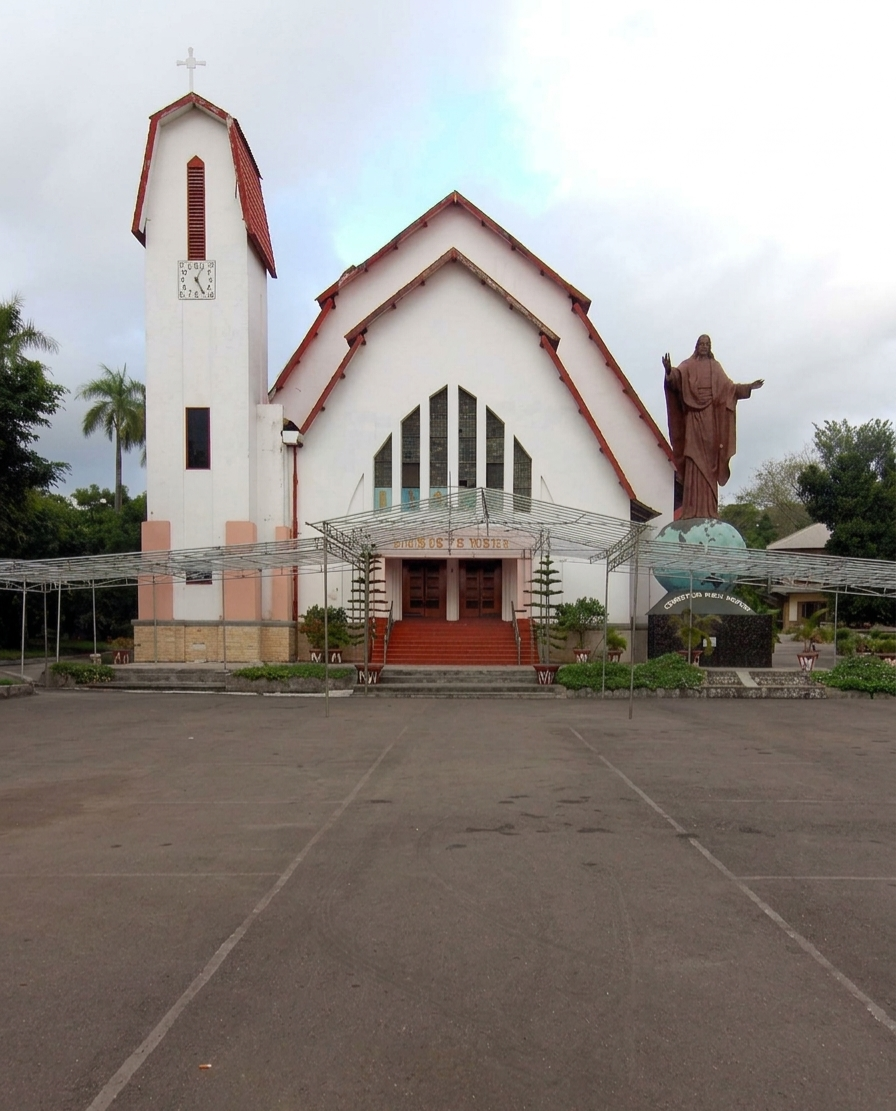
The Catholic cathedral in Ende, Flores. Most Flores inhabitants are Catholics.

Portuguese explorers arrived in the Maluku Islands in 1534, with the goal of converting the natives to Catholicism and to obtain valuable spices endemic to the region. The Spaniard Francis Xavier, a co-founder of the Jesuit Order, worked in the islands from 1546 to 1547 and baptised several thousand locals of the islands of Ambon, Ternate and Morotai (or Moro), laying the foundations for a permanent mission there. Following his departure from Maluku, others carried on his work and by the 1560s there were 10,000 Catholics in the area, mostly on Ambon; by the 1590s there were 50,000 to 60,000. Portuguese Dominican priests also had some success in missionary activities on Solor whereby in the 1590s the Portuguese and local Catholic population is thought to have numbered 25,000.

=== VOC era ===
Cornelis de Houtman was the first Dutchman who sailed east to modern-day Indonesia, in 1595. Although his expedition could be considered a commercial failure, it showed the Dutch they were able to sail east in search of the spices. In 1602 the Dutch East India Company (VOC) was created. The Netherlands, like Britain, had a staunchly Protestant government at the time, which extended to the VOC; even though there were many Dutch Catholics, they had little influence. Ambon was conquered and occupied by the VOC in 1605, and the Catholics were forced to convert to Protestantism. The same happened in Manado and the islands of Sangihe-Talaud. In 1613 Solor also fell to the Dutch, and Catholic mission activity was reduced in Flores and Timor, which were still under Portuguese administration.

The Catholic priests were replaced with Protestant clergy from the Netherlands. Many Christians at the time converted to Protestantism. For some time, Catholic priests were threatened with capital punishment if found to be residing in VOC territory. In 1624, Father Egidius d'Abreu SJ was executed in Batavia during the administration of Governor-General Jan Pieterszoon Coen, for celebrating Mass in prison.

Father Alexander de Rhodes, a French Jesuit who invented the Vietnamese westernised alphabet system, was forced to watch his cross and Mass accessories burned underneath where two convicted thieves were just hung to their deaths. The Jesuit priest was then expelled from VOC territories in 1646.

John Gaspard Cratz, an Austrian, was forced to leave Batavia due to difficulties with the administrators when he helped Catholic priests who were in transit in Batavia. He was moved to Macau, joined the Jesuit Order, and died as a martyr in Vietnam in 1737.

At the end of the 18th century Western Europe saw intense warfare between France and Great Britain and their respective allies. The sympathies of the people of the Netherlands were divided, and the Netherlands lost its independence. In 1799 the VOC went bankrupt and was dissolved. In 1806 Napoleon assigned his brother Louis Bonaparte, a Catholic, to the throne of the Netherlands.

=== East Indies era ===
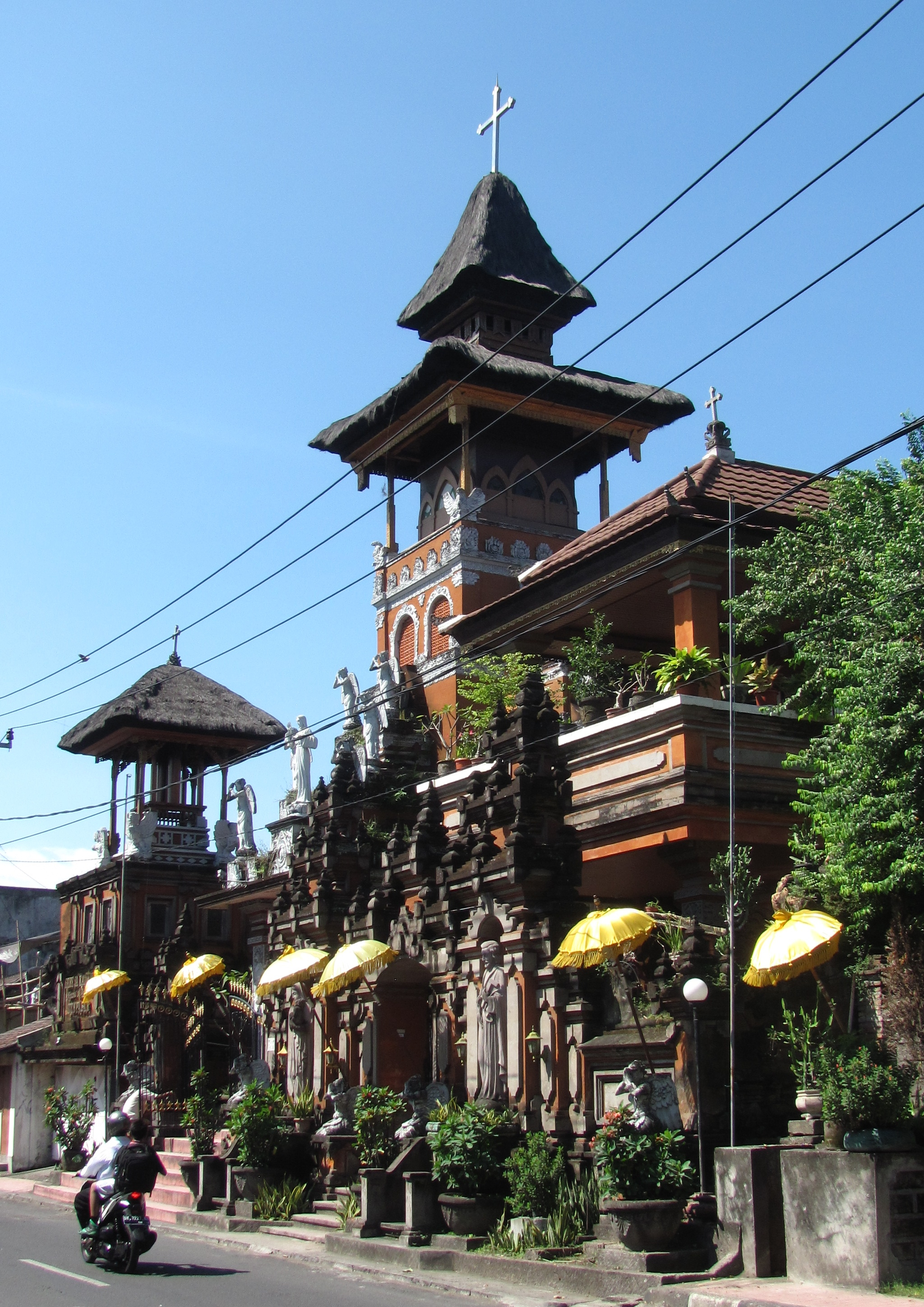
Saint Joseph's Catholic Church, Denpasar, Bali

The change of politics in the Netherlands, mainly because of the accession of Louis Bonaparte, a fervent Catholic, brought a positive effect. Religious freedom was recognised by the government. On 8 May 1807, the pope in Rome was given permission from King Louis to establish an Apostolic Prefecture of East Indies in Batavia.

On 4 April 1808, two Dutch priests arrived in Batavia. They were Fr. Jacobus Nelissen and Fr. Lambertus Prinsen. Nelissen became the first Apostolic Prefect when the Apostolic Prefecture of Batavia was created in 1826.

Governor-General Daendels (1808–1811) replaced VOC with the government of Dutch East Indies. Religious freedom was then practised, although Catholicism was still difficult.

=== Van Lith era ===
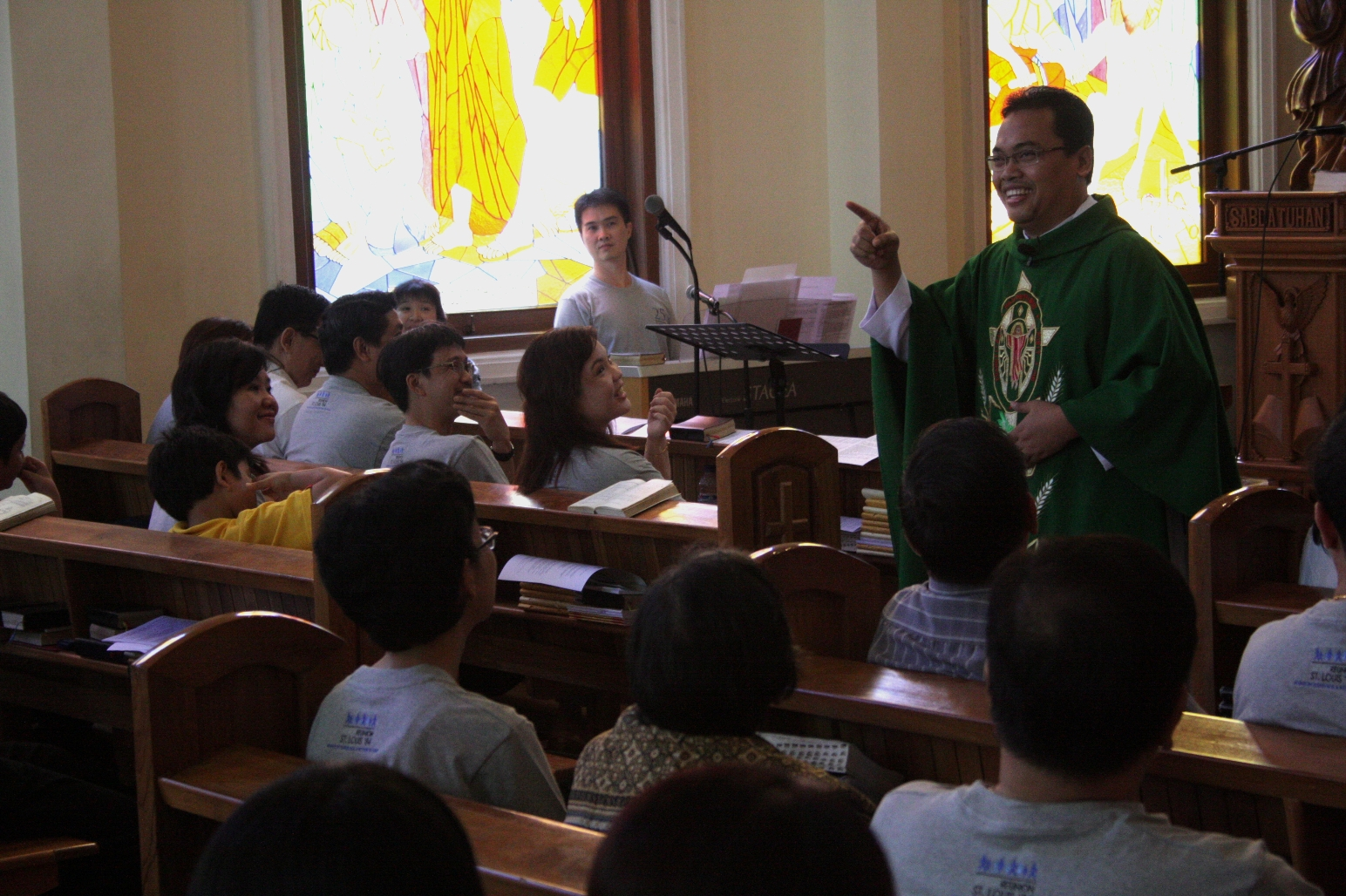
Principal and students of St. Louis High School, Surabaya at the chapel

Catholicism started to spread in Central Java when Fr. Frans van Lith SJ from the Netherlands came to Muntilan, Central Java, in 1896. His effort showed little progress until 1904 when four chiefs (the heads of the town) from the Kalibawang region came to his house and demanded that he catechize them. On 15 December 1904, a group of 178 Javanese were baptised at Semagung, between two trees called "Sono". This place is now called Sendangsono in Muntilan, district Magelang, Central Java, near the border of the province of DI Yogyakarta.

Van Lith also established a school for teachers in Muntilan called "Normaalschool" in 1900 and "Kweekschool (also for teachers)" in 1904. In 1918, all Catholic schools were put under the jurisdiction of an institute named "Yayasan Kanisius", which produced the first priests and bishops of Indonesia. In the 20th century, the Catholic Church grew quickly.

In 1911, Van Lith established the "Seminari Menengah" (minor seminary). Three out of the six candidates that were at the school during 1911–1914 were received into the priesthood in 1926–1928. Those priests were FX Satiman SJ, Adrianus Djajasepoetra SJ, and Albertus Soegijapranata SJ.

=== World War II and the War of Independence ===
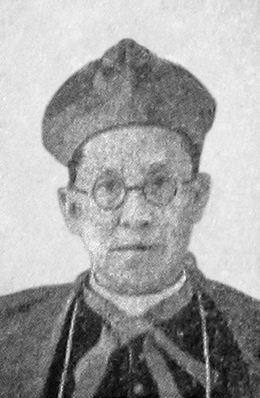
Albertus Soegijapranata, a national hero of Indonesia, an ex-Muslim, was the first native Indonesian bishop and known for his pro-nationalistic stance, often expressed as "100% Catholic, 100% Indonesian".

Albertus Soegijapranata SJ became the first Indonesian bishop in 1940 and later Archbishop of Semarang.

On 20 December 1948, Father Sandjaja and Brother Hermanus Bouwens SJ were killed in a village called Kembaran, near Muntilan, when Dutch soldiers attacked Semarang. Father Sandjaja is recognised as a martyr by the Indonesian Catholics, (not officially canonised or approved by the Holy See). Monsignor Soegijapranata with Bishop Willekens SJ faced Japanese colonial rule. They managed, however, to keep Saint Carolus Hospital operating normally.

Some of the most notable Indonesian national heroes are Catholics, including Agustinus Adisoetjipto (1947) after whom is named Yogyakarta International Airport, Adisutjipto Airport, Ignatius Slamet Riyadi (1945), and Yos Soedarso (1961).

=== Post-independence era ===
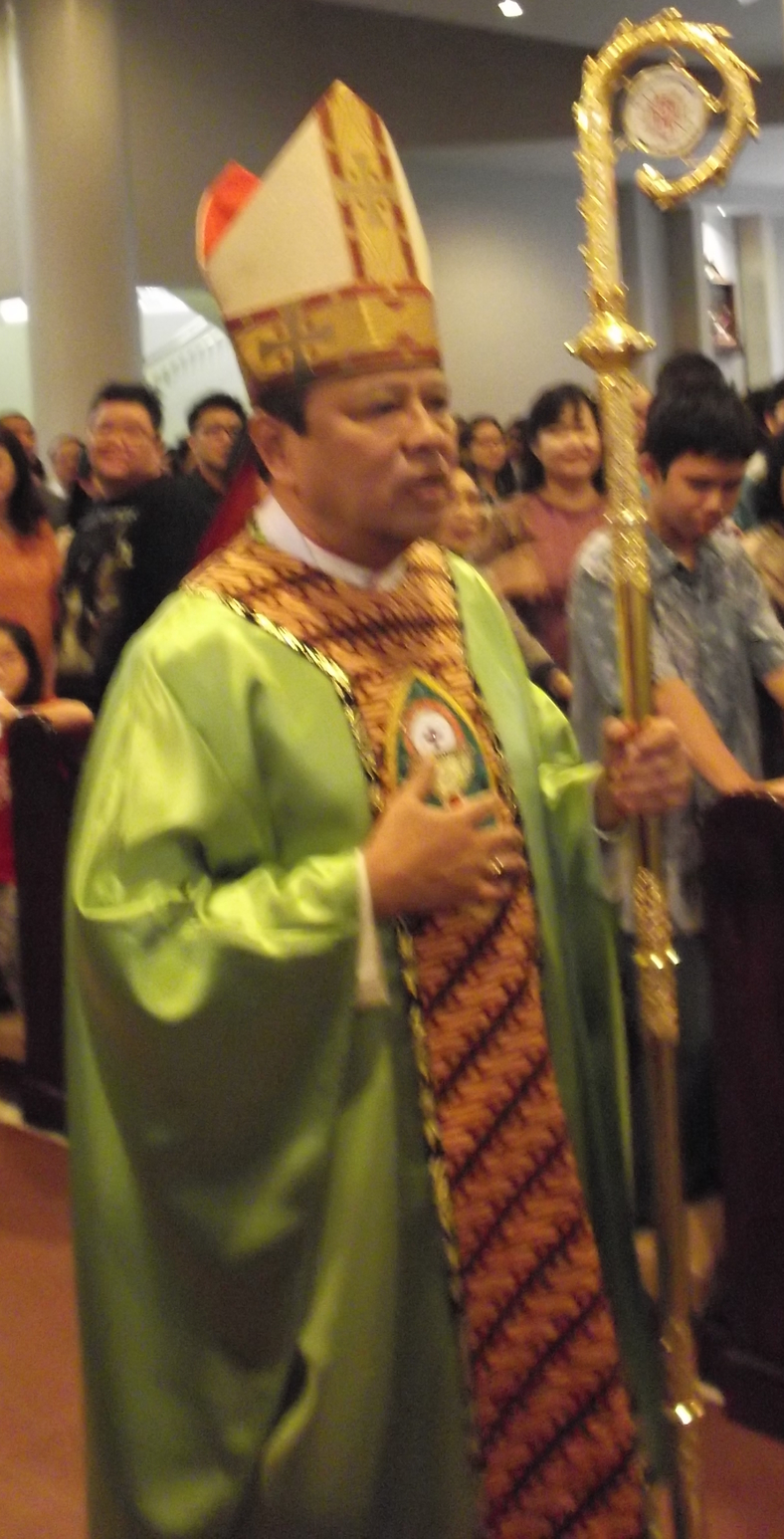
Ignatius Suharyo Hardjoatmodjo, the Archbishop of Jakarta

The first Indonesian archbishop to be made cardinal was Justinus Darmojuwono on 29 June 1967. Indonesian Bishops took part in the second Vatican Council, which was convened from 1962 to 1965. Pope Paul VI visited Indonesia in 1970, followed in 1989 by Pope John Paul II. The places visited were Jakarta (capital of Indonesia), Medan (North Sumatra), Yogyakarta (DI Yogyakarta), cities of Central Java province, Maumere (Flores), and Dili (Timor Timur) (now the country of East Timor).

The head of the Archdiocese of Jakarta ("Keuskupan Agung Jakarta") is Archbishop Ignatius Suharyo Hardjoatmodjo. Indonesia's only cardinal is Julius Darmaatmadja SJ. He took part in the conclave which elected Pope Benedict XVI. For health reasons, however, he declined to take part in the recent conclave that elected Pope Francis.

In 1965, after the overthrow of Sukarno, a purge was carried out against Indonesian communists and alleged communists, especially in Java and Bali. Hundreds of thousands, perhaps millions, of civilians were killed in the ensuing turmoil by the army and vigilantes. Communism was associated with atheism and since that time every Indonesian citizen has been expected to adopt one of the then five official state-endorsed religions.

Catholicism and other minority religions have experienced enormous growth especially in areas inhabited by large numbers of Chinese Indonesians and ethnic Javanese. For example, in 2000 in Jakarta alone there were 301,084 Catholics, while in 1960 there were only 26,955. This means the Catholic population increased elevenfold while in the same period the population of Jakarta merely tripled, from 2,800,000 to 8,347,000. This growth may also be attributed to increased migration to the capital from Christian parts of Indonesia when in 1960 there were not so many from the regions residing in Jakarta as now.

The dramatic increase of the number of Catholics in particular, and Christians in general, has led to enmity and unfounded allegations of "Christianisation".

The second half of the 1990s and beginning of the 2000s were also marked by violence against Catholics in particular and Christians in general. However, former president Abdurrahman Wahid, himself a leader of Nahdatul Ulama, one of the biggest Muslim organisations in Indonesia, made several contributions in reconciling the simmering antipathy among the different religious groups.

In 2006, the Bishops' Conference established Caritas Indonesia, also known as Karina, as the official humanitarian relief organisation of the Indonesian Church.

As recently as 2010, there were incidents where Catholics and other Christians were banned from celebrating Christmas services.

Pope Francis visited Indonesia from 3 to 6 September 2024.

== Demographics ==
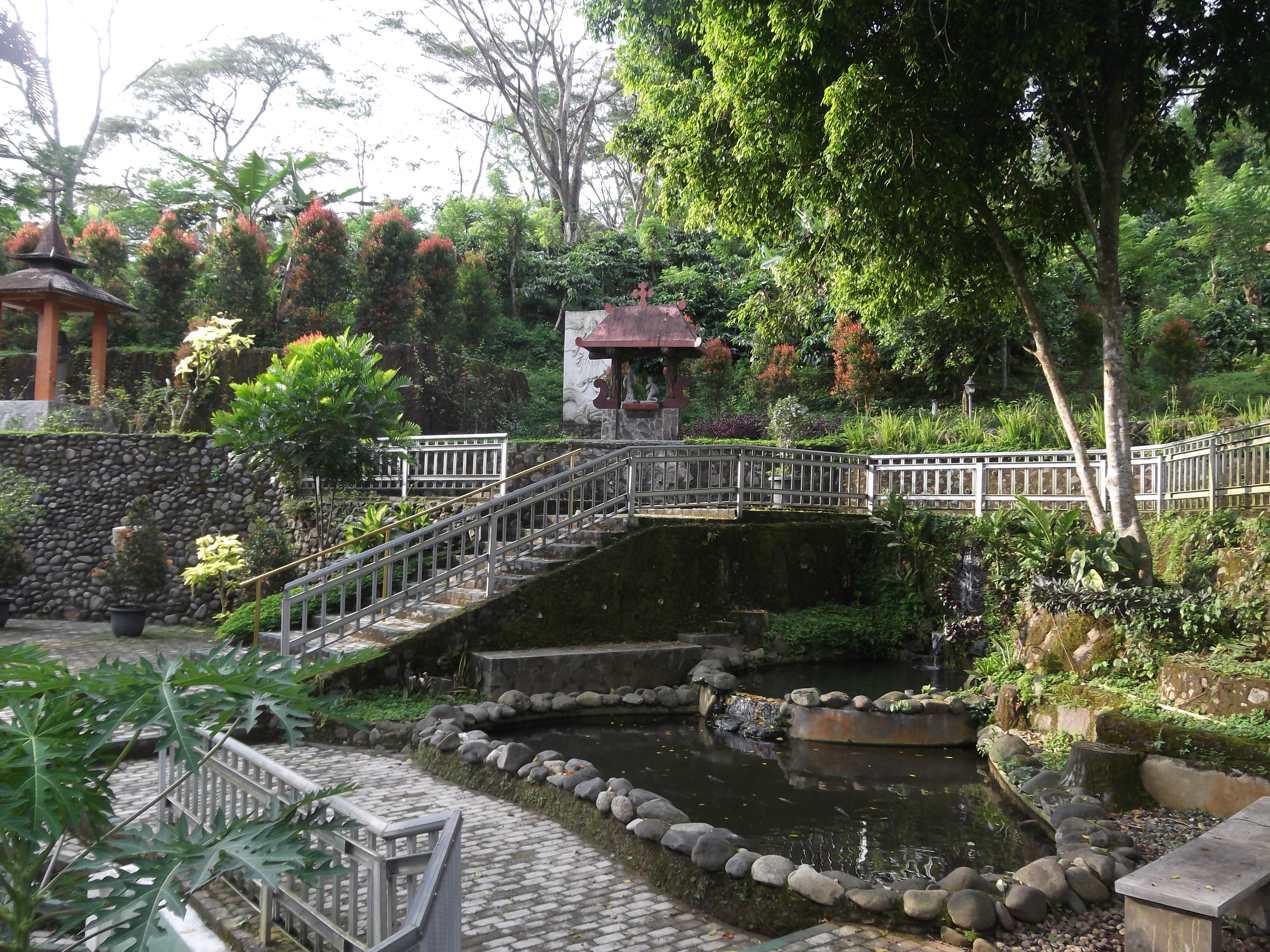
Rawaseneng Monastery (Pertapaan Santa Maria Rawaseneng), in Temanggung Regency, Central Java

The Statistics Indonesia (BPS) conducts a census every 10 years. Data available from 2000 drew on 201,241,999 survey responses. BPS estimated that the census missed 4.6 million people. The BPS report indicated that 85.1 per cent of the population label themselves Muslim, 9.2 per cent Protestant, 3.5 per cent Catholic, 1.81 per cent Hindu, 0.84 per cent Buddhist, and 0.2 per cent "other," including traditional indigenous religions, other Christian groups, and Judaism. The country's religious composition remains a politically charged issue; as some Christians, Hindus, and members of other minority faiths argue that the census undercounted non-Muslims. The 2000 BPS then claims 88.22% of the population would be Muslim if the missed 4.6 million people were counted. In 2018, Indonesia made another census by the Badan Pusat Statistik Indonesia. The results stated that 86.7% of Indonesians are Muslims, 10.72% Christians (7.6% Protestants, 3.12% Roman Catholic), 1.74% Hindus, 0.77% Buddhists and 0.07% others.

== List of Catholic provinces and dioceses in Indonesia ==
Indonesian Catholic party

=== Immediately subject to the Holy See ===
- Military Ordinariate of Indonesia

=== Ecclesiastical Province of Jakarta ===
- Archdiocese of Jakarta
  - Diocese of Bandung
  - Diocese of Bogor

=== Ecclesiastical Province of Ende ===
- Archdiocese of Ende
  - Diocese of Denpasar
  - Diocese of Labuan Bajo
  - Diocese of Larantuka
  - Diocese of Maumere
  - Diocese of Ruteng

=== Ecclesiastical Province of Kupang ===
- Archdiocese of Kupang
  - Diocese of Atambua
  - Diocese of Weetebula

=== Ecclesiastical Province of Makassar ===
- Archdiocese of Makassar
  - Diocese of Amboina
  - Diocese of Manado

=== Ecclesiastical Province of Medan ===
- Archdiocese of Medan
  - Diocese of Padang
  - Diocese of Sibolga

=== Ecclesiastical Province of Merauke ===
- Archdiocese of Merauke
  - Diocese of Agats
  - Diocese of Jayapura
  - Diocese of Manokwari-Sorong
  - Diocese of Timika

=== Ecclesiastical Province of Palembang ===
- Archdiocese of Palembang
  - Diocese of Pangkal-Pinang
  - Diocese of Tanjungkarang

=== Ecclesiastical Province of Pontianak ===
- Archdiocese of Pontianak
  - Diocese of Ketapang
  - Diocese of Sanggau
  - Diocese of Sintang

=== Ecclesiastical Province of Samarinda ===
- Archdiocese of Samarinda
  - Diocese of Banjarmasin
  - Diocese of Palangkaraya
  - Diocese of Tanjung Selor

=== Ecclesiastical Province of Semarang ===
- Archdiocese of Semarang
  - Diocese of Malang
  - Diocese of Purwokerto
  - Diocese of Surabaya

== See also ==
- List of Catholic dioceses in Indonesia
- List of church buildings in Indonesia
- Holy See–Indonesia relations
- Religion in Indonesia
- Christianity in Indonesia
- Demographics of Indonesia
