= Ignatius Suharyo Hardjoatmodjo =

Indonesian cardinal

His Eminence Ignatius Suharyo
- Cardinal, Archbishop of Jakarta
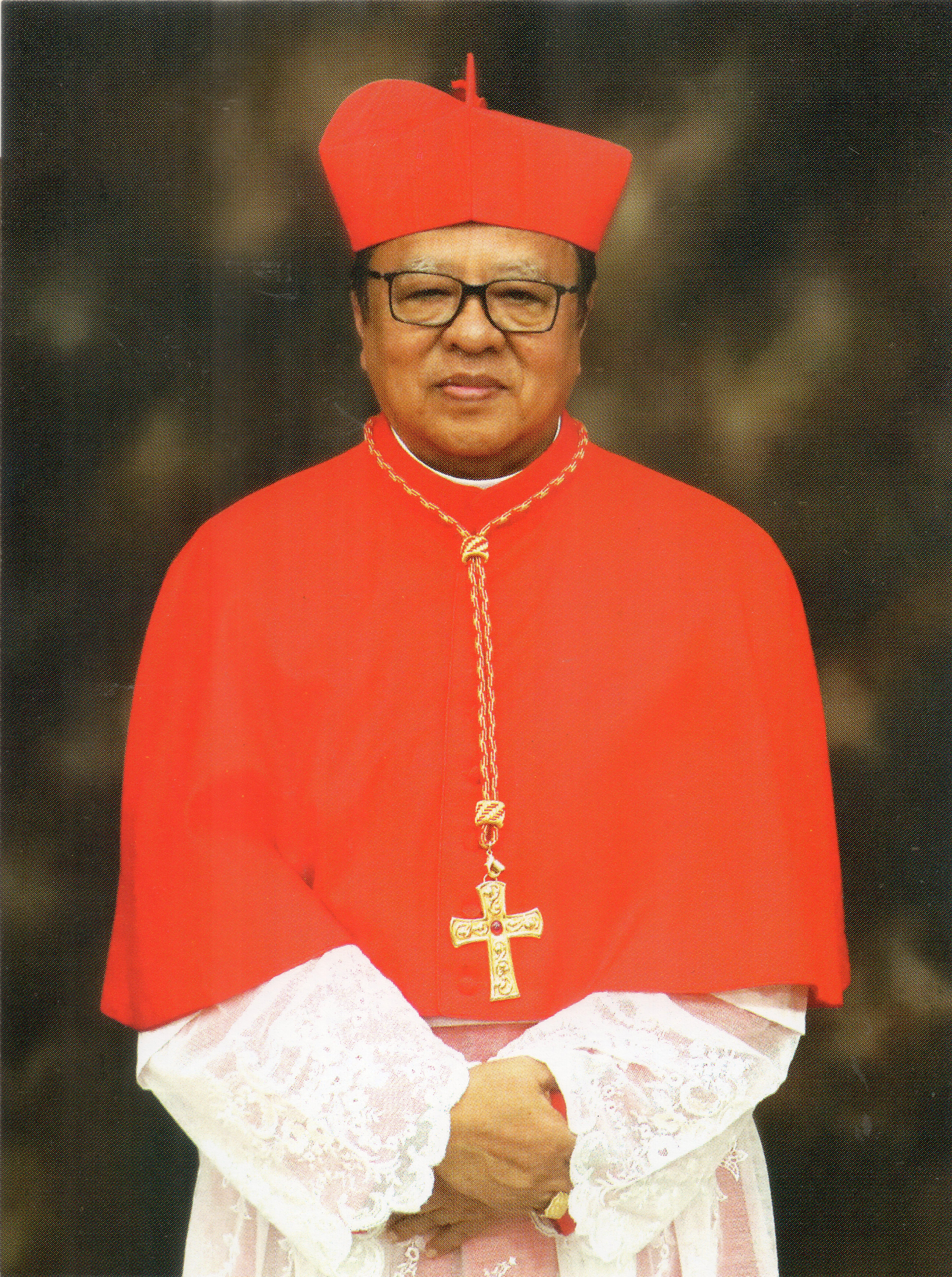
- Official portrait, 2022
- Church: Catholic Church
- Archdiocese: Jakarta
- Appointed: 28 June 2010
- Installed: 29 June 2010
- Predecessor: Julius Darmaatmadja
- Other posts: Military Ordinary of Indonesia (2006–); Cardinal Priest of Spirito Santo alla Ferratella (2019–)
- Previous posts: Archbishop of Semarang (1997‍–‍2009); Coadjutor Archbishop of Jakarta (2009‍–‍2010); President of the Bishops' Conference of Indonesia (2012‍–‍2022)

Orders
- Ordination: 26 January 1976 by Justinus Darmojuwono
- Consecration: 22 August 1997 by Julius Darmaatmadja
- Created cardinal: 5 October 2019 by Pope Francis
- Rank: Cardinal priest

Personal details
- Born: Ignatius Suharyo Hardjoatmodjo; 9 July 1950 (age 76) Bantul, Indonesia
- Education: Sanata Dharma University; Pontifical Urban University
- Motto: Serviens Domino cum omni humilitate (Latin for 'Serving the Lord with all humility') (Note: Acts 20:19)
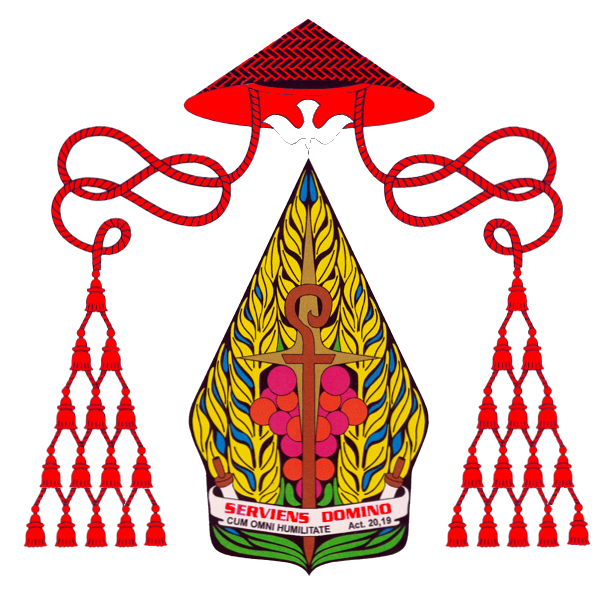
- Coat of arms: Ignatius Suharyo's coat of arms

Ordination history
History
Priestly ordination
- Ordained by: Justinus Darmojuwono
Episcopal consecration
- Principal consecrator: Julius Darmaatmadja
- Co-consecrators: Pietro Sambi; Blasius Pujaraharja
Cardinalate
- Elevated by: Pope Francis
Episcopal succession
Bishops consecrated by Ignatius Suharyo Hardjoatmodjo as principal consecrator
- Antonius Subianto Bunjamin: 25 August 2014
- Henricus Pidyarto Gunawan: 3 September 2016
- Robertus Rubiyatmoko: 19 May 2017
- Siprianus Hormat: 19 March 2020
- Fransiskus Tuaman Sinaga: 20 July 2021
- Maximilianus Rex: 1 November 2024

Styles of Ignatius Suharyo Hardjoatmodjo
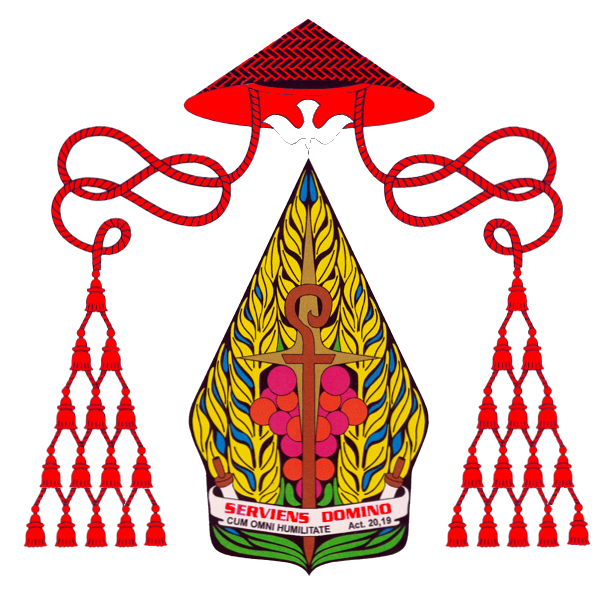
- Reference style: His Eminence
- Spoken style: Your Eminence
- Religious style: Cardinal
- Informal style: Cardinal
- See: Jakarta

Ignatius Suharyo Hardjoatmodjo (born 9 July 1950) is an Indonesian ecclesiastical prelate of the Catholic Church, who has served as the Archbishop of Jakarta since 29 June 2010, succeeding Cardinal Julius Darmaatmadja, S.J. Prior to this position, Archbishop Suharyo was the Coadjutor Archbishop of Jakarta. He currently also serves as the Military Ordinary of Indonesia. Previously, he held the position of Archbishop of Semarang from 1997 to 2009. He is commonly known as Archbishop Suharyo.

Since 15 November 2012, he has served as President of the Indonesian Bishops' Conference, succeeding Bishop Martinus Dogma Situmorang, OFM.Cap. On 5 October 2019, he was officially appointed by Pope Francis as the rank of cardinal for the Catholic Church in Indonesia. He was the only Indonesian cardinal who participated as a cardinal elector in the 2025 papal conclave following the death of Pope Francis, which ultimately elected Pope Leo XIV.

== Early life and priesthood ==
Ignatius Suharyo Hardjoatmodjo was born on 9 July 1950 in Sedayu, Bantul, Yogyakarta, Indonesia. His father was Florentinus Amir Hardjodisastra, an employee at the Irrigation Service of the Special Region of Yogyakarta. His mother was Theodora Murni Hardjadisastra. He is the seventh of ten siblings. His brothers are Yohanes Subagyo and Suitbertus Ari Sunardi OCSO, and his sisters are Christina Sri Murni FMM and Maria Magdalena Marganingsih PMY. His older brother, Fr. Suitbertus Ari Sunardi, OCSO, is a priest-monk at the Monastery of Santa Maria Rawaseneng in Temanggung Regency, Central Java. Two of his sisters became nuns: Sister Christina Sri Murni, FMM, and Sister Maria Magdalena Marganingsih, PMY. He graduated St. Peter Canisius Minor seminary in Mertoyudan, Central Java in 1968. He completed his undergraduate degree in Philosophy and Theology at Sanata Dharma University, Yogyakarta, in 1971 and doctoral degree in biblical studies from the Pontifical Urban University, Rome, in 1981.

Suharyo began his primary education at Kanisius Elementary School in Gubuk, Sedayu, and in the fourth grade transferred to Tarakanita Elementary School in Bumijo, Yogyakarta. He continued his education at the Minor Seminary in Mertoyudan, Magelang Regency, Central Java, starting in 1961. He completed his secondary education at the Mertoyudan Major Seminary and graduated in 1968. He then pursued higher education at IKIP Sanata Dharma, Yogyakarta, earning a Bachelor of Arts in Philosophy/Theology in 1971 and a full degree in Philosophy/Theology in 1976. He was ordained priest of Archdiocese of Semarang on 26 January 1976.

Even so, Cardinal Justinus Darmojuwono later assigned him to continue his studies in Rome, Italy. He completed his doctoral studies in Biblical Theology at the Pontifical Urban University in Rome in 1981 and received his doctorate in theology in 1981 with his thesis Ecclesiological implications of the Lucan Last Supper narrative.

After returning to his homeland, Suharyo Hardjoatmodjo was involved in priestly formation at the seminary in Yogyakarta. From 1981 to 1991, he also taught catechetics at the Pradnyawidya Catechetical Philosophy College in Yogyakarta. Between 1983 and 1993, he headed the Department of Philosophy and Sociology at Sanata Dharma University in Yogyakarta, before becoming Dean of its Faculty of Theology in 1993. Starting in 1989, he additionally served as Professor of New Testament Studies at the Wedabhakti Faculty of Theology in Yogyakarta, and from 1994 to 1996 also lectured at Duta Wacana Christian University in Yogyakarta and Parahyangan Catholic University in Bandung. Furthermore, from 1996 to 1997, Suharyo Hardjoatmodjo was Director of the postgraduate program at Sanata Dharma University and in 1997 served as Chairman of the Driyarkara Foundation Consortium. He was also a member of the Biblical Commission of the Archdiocese of Semarang and headed the Brotherhood of Praja Priests.

== Archbishopric ==
=== Archbishop of Semarang ===
Pope John Paul II appointed him Archbishop of Semarang on 21 April 1997. He received his episcopal consecration on 22 August of the same year at Jatidiri Stadium in Semarang from the Archbishop of Jakarta, Julius Riyadi Cardinal Darmaatmadja, S.J.; the co-consecrators were the Apostolic Nuncio to Indonesia, Archbishop Pietro Sambi, and the Bishop of Ketapang, Blasius Pujaraharja. He chose as his episcopal motto Serviens Domino cum omni humilitate ("Serving the Lord with all humility") from Acts 20:19. While in that post, he served as secretary general of the Bishops' Conference of Indonesia, and a member of the Office of Ecumenical and Interreligious Affairs of the Federation of Asian Bishops' Conferences.

In addition, from 1997 to 2000, he chaired the Commission for Interreligious Dialogue of the Indonesian Bishops' Conference (KWI). From 2000 to 2006, Suharyo was elected Secretary-General of the Indonesian Bishops' Conference for a three-year term until 2003, during which Cardinal Julius served as President of the Presidium.On 8 November 2003, Suharyo was re-elected to the same position, with Cardinal Julius once again serving as President of the Presidium. He was also a member of the Commission for Ecumenism and Interreligious Dialogue of the Federation of Asian Bishops' Conferences (FABC) from 2000 to 2006. Suharyo also served as Professor of Theology at Sanata Dharma University Beginning in May 2004.

In participating in multiple Synod of Bishops events, Suharyo also took part in the Special Assembly for Asia of the Synod of Bishops on the theme Jesus Christ the Savior and His Mission of Love and Service in Asia (1998). In 2002, he participated in the Synod of Bishops on The Word of God in the Life and Mission of the Church. And in the 12th Ordinary General Assembly of the Synod of Bishops on the theme The Word of God in the Life and Mission of the Church (2008).

On 8 September 2000, Suharyo served as co-consecrating bishop in the episcopal ordination of the Bishop of Purwokerto, Julianus Sunarka, S.J. together with the Bishop of Bandung, Alexander Soetandio Djajasiswaja. The principal consecrator was the Archbishop of Jakarta, Julius Cardinal Darmaatmadja, S.J.

On 2 January 2006, he was also appointed Ordinary of the Indonesian Military Forces Ordinariate on 2 January 2006 by Pope Benedict XVI, succeeding Cardinal Julius Darmaatmadja, S.J. On 16 November of the same year, he was elected First Vice President of the Indonesian Bishops' Conference from 2006 to 2012, while the position of President of the Presidium was held by the Bishop of Padang, Martinus Dogma Situmorang, O.F.M. Cap.

On 16 July 2008, together with the Apostolic Nuncio to Indonesia and Timor-Leste, as well as Titular Archbishop of Capreae, Leopoldo Girelli, Archbishop Suharyo acted as co-consecrator in the ordination of Johannes Pujasumarta as Bishop of Bandung. The principal consecrator was again Julius Cardinal Darmaatmadja, S.J., Archbishop of Jakarta.

=== Archbishop of Jakarta ===
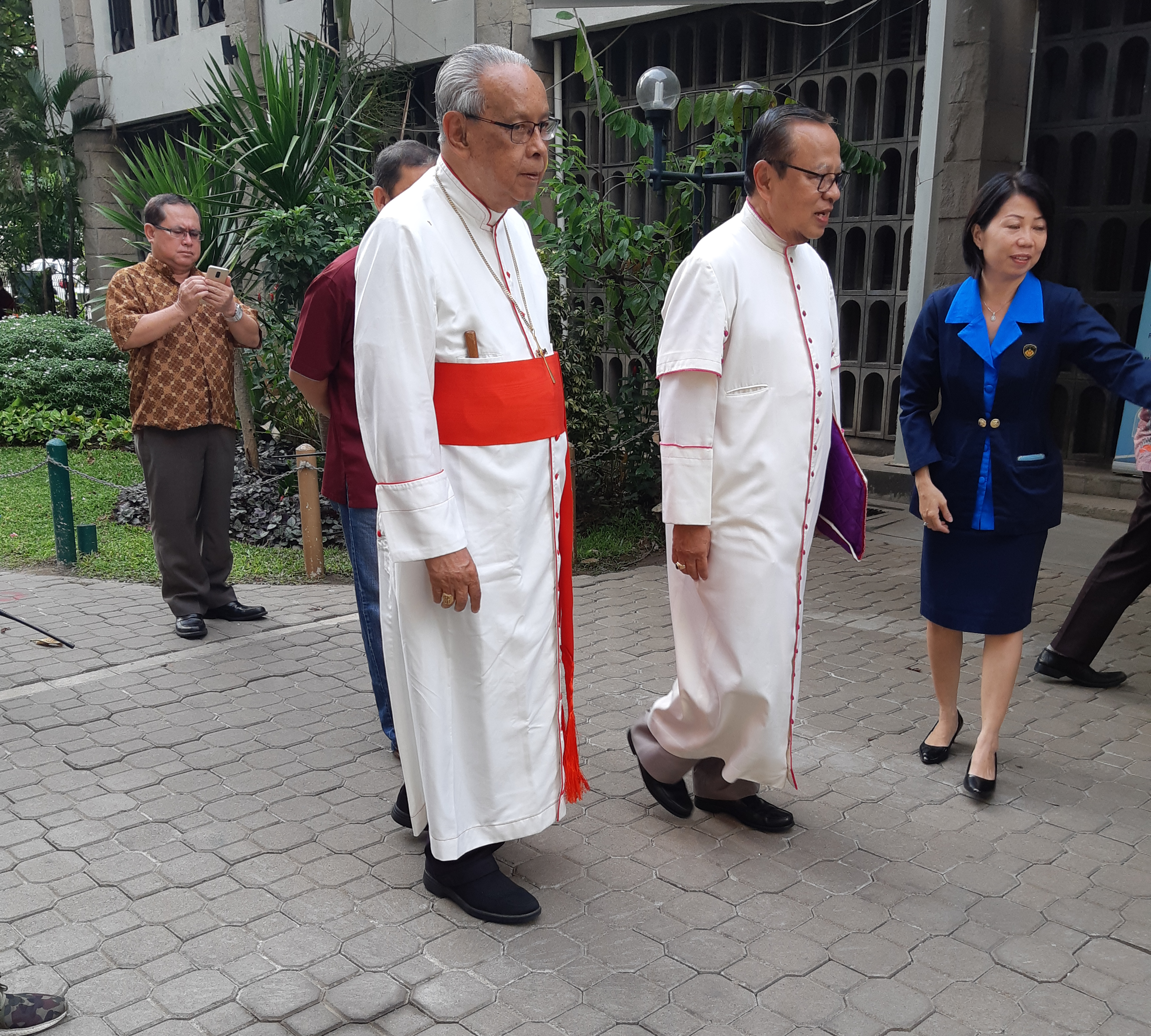
Cardinal Julius Darmaatmadja (left) with then-Archbishop Ignatius Suharyo (right), 14 November 2018

On 28 June 2010, Pope Benedict XVI accepted the resignation of Julius Cardinal Darmaatmadja. Following the request for retirement by Cardinal Julius Darmaatmadja, S.J. for reasons of age, the Holy See appointed Archbishop Suharyo as Coadjutor Archbishop of Jakarta on 25 July 2009. He officially left the Archdiocese of Semarang on 27 October 2009 and was received by the Archdiocese of Jakarta the following day. During the vacancy in Semarang, Rev. Pius Riana Prapdi was appointed Apostolic Administrator by the Presbyteral council of the Archdiocese of Semarang, until the Bishop of Bandung, Johannes Pujasumarta, was installed as the new Archbishop of Semarang. On 11 November 2009, Archbishop Suharyo resumed his role as First Vice President of the Indonesian Bishops' Conference, while the Presidency remained with Bishop Martinus Dogma Situmorang, O.F.M. Cap.

At Christmas 2012, he protested the roadblocks Indonesian Christian face in getting permission to construct churches on their own property.

On 13 September 2014, Pope Francis named him a member of the Congregation for the Evangelisation of Peoples.

He was elected the president of the Episcopal Conference of Indonesia in 2012 until 2022.

He also attended the Synod of Bishops on the New Evangelisation in October 2012 where he advocated for allowing regional bishops' conferences greater authority over translations of the Missal, noting the negative associations attached in Indonesia to the word spirit, which if unmodified indicates an evil spirit. He also notes the appeal of the vernacular in Catholic prayer in contrast to the Arabic used only for prayer by the Muslim majority in Indonesia. He also attended the Synod of Bishops in October 2015.

== Cardinal ==
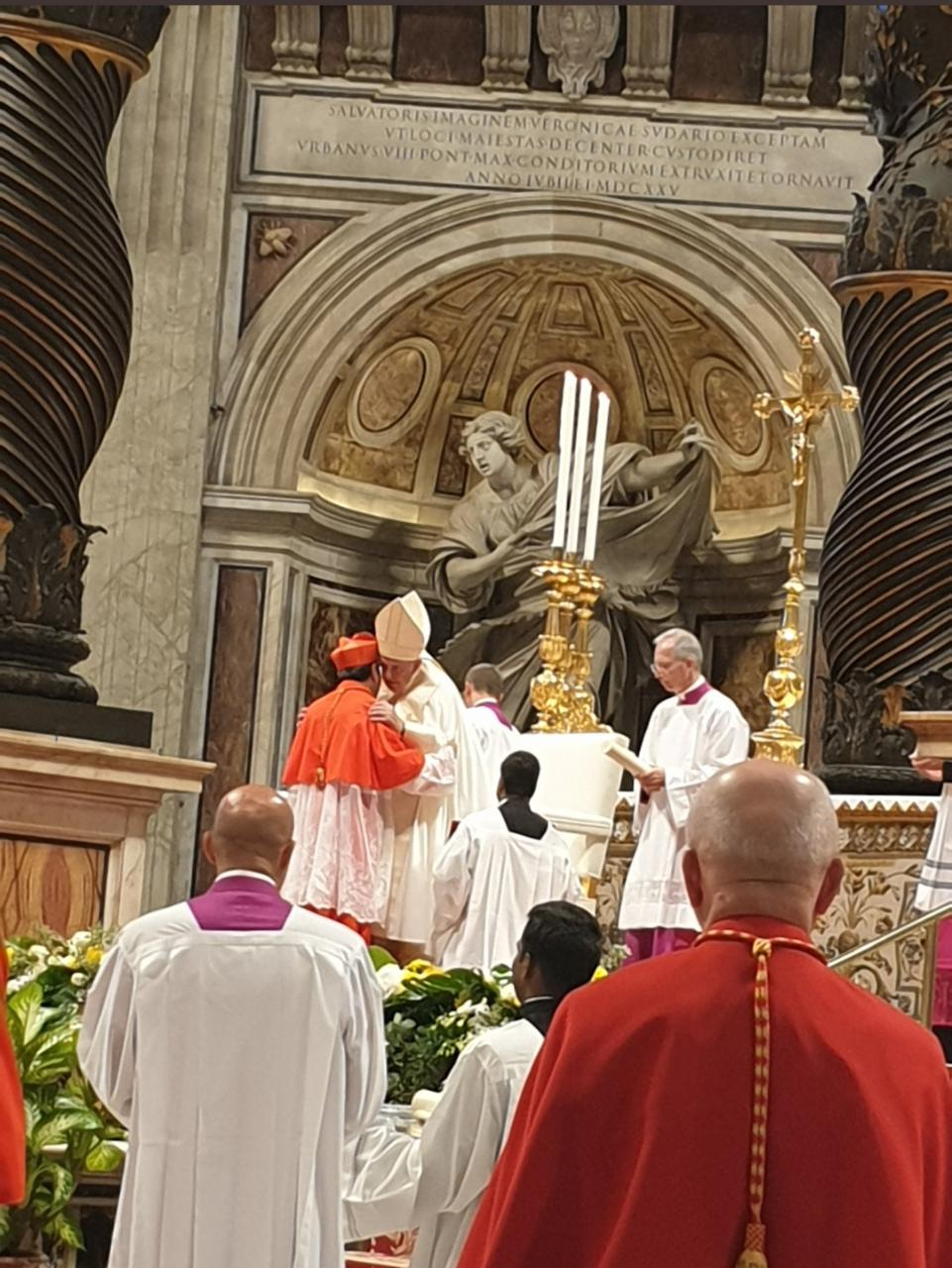
Ignatius Suharyo Hardjoatmodjo embraced by Pope Francis during the inauguration as Cardinal, at St. Peter's Basilica, Vatican

On 1 September 2019, Pope Francis announced he would make him a cardinal, the third from Indonesia. On 5 October 2019, Pope Francis made him Cardinal Priest of Spirito Santo alla Ferratella. He was made a member of the Congregation for the Evangelization of Peoples on 21 February 2020.

In March 2025, he called on government authorities to release the transgender artist Ratu Thalisa from prison after she was convicted of blasphemy based on the complaints of Protestant groups after she joked that Jesus would have to cut his hair to conform to modern gender stereotypes. Suharyo Hardjoatmodjo said Christians needed a sense of humor, called for respect for "freedom of expression" and said that "only people who are unable to celebrate diversity feel disturbed" by her humor.

In July 2025, Suharyo submitted his resignation as Archbishop of Jakarta. However, during a thanksgiving Mass marking his 50th anniversary on 26 January 2026, he revealed that the Vatican had responded to his letter, with the Pope requesting that he continue his ministry until July 2027.

== See also ==
- Cardinals created by Francis
- Catholic Church in Indonesia

== Notes ==
Catholic Church titles
Preceded by Julius Darmaatmadja	Archbishop of Semarang; 1997–2009	Succeeded by Johannes Pujasumarta
Preceded by Julius Darmaatmadja	Military Ordinary of Indonesia; 2006–present	Incumbent
Preceded by Julius Darmaatmadja	Archbishop of Jakarta; 2010–present	Incumbent
Preceded by Martinus Dogma Situmorang	Chair of the Bishops' Conference of Indonesia; 2012–2022	Succeeded by Antonius Subianto Bunjamin
Preceded by Ivan Dias	Cardinal Priest of Spirito Santo alla Ferratella; 2019–present	Incumbent
