= Paskalis Bruno Syukur =

Indonesian Catholic prelate (born 1962)

His Excellency, The Most Reverend Paskalis Bruno Syukur OFM
- Bishop Emeritus of Bogor
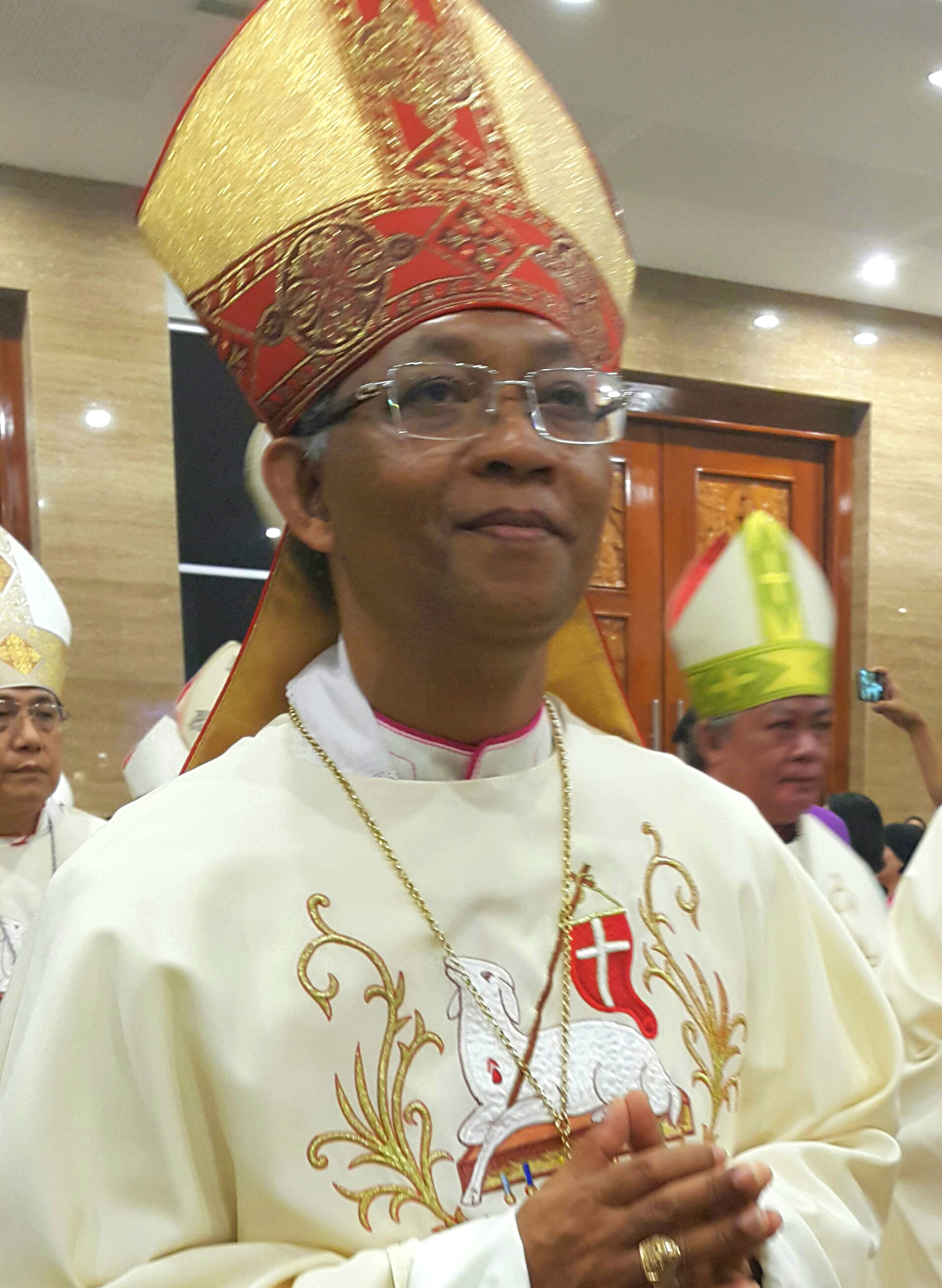
- Syukur in 2017
- Diocese: Bogor
- Appointed: 21 November 2013
- Installed: 22 February 2014
- Retired: 19 January 2026
- Predecessor: Cosmas Michael Angkur OFM

Orders
- Ordination: 2 February 1991 by Ignatius Harsono
- Consecration: 22 February 2014 by Cosmas Michael Angkur

Personal details
- Born: 17 May 1962 (age 64) Ranggu, Manggarai Regency, East Nusa Tenggara, Indonesia

Paskalis Bruno Syukur O.F.M. (born 17 May 1962) is an Indonesian prelate of the Catholic Church who served as Bishop of Bogor between 2014 and 2026. He has been secretary general of the Bishops' Conference of Indonesia since 2022. Pope Francis planned to make Syukur a cardinal in December 2024 but Syukur declined the honor. He is a member of the Order of Friars Minor.

== Biography ==
Paskalis Bruno Syukur was born on 17 May 1962 in Ranggu, a district in the West Manggarai Regency on the island of Flores. He studied at St. Pius XII Middle Seminary in Kisol and joined the Franciscans in 1982 and took his first vows on 15 July 1983. He completed his bachelor's degree in philosophy in 1987 at the Driyarkara School of Philosophy in Jakarta. He continued his studies at the Faculty of Theology at Sanata Dharma University, at the Saint Paul Kentungan Major Seminary Campus, Yogyakarta. He took his final vows as a Franciscan on 22 January 1989 in Yogyakarta.

He was ordained to the priesthood on 2 February 1991. He spent the next two years from 1991 to 1993 working in the Diocese of Jayapura at the parish of Santa Maria Ratu Para Malaikat. From 1993 to 1996 he studied Franciscan spirituality at the Pontifical University Antonianum in Rome. He was master of Franciscan novices in Depok from 1996 to 2001, while serving in the parish Saint Herkulanus there. He was provincial minister for the Franciscans of Indonesia from 2001 to 2009 when he became definitor general for the Asia and Oceania region, which includes India, Pakistan, Japan, Australia, New Zealand and Indonesia.

Pope Francis appointed him bishop of Bogor on 21 November 2013. He received his episcopal consecration on 22 February 2014 in the Sentul International Convention Center from Cosmas Michael Angkur, his predecessor in Bogor. On 8 July 2019, he was named a member of the Congregation for Institutes of Consecrated Life and Societies of Apostolic Life.

In 2020, while deputy chair of the Bishops' Conference of Indonesia, he addressed the country's first prosecution for the sexual abuse of minors, an acolyte trainer accused of molesting 23 altar boys. He said the Church was developing a manual for child protection in conformity with Vatican guidelines that call for cooperation with local authorities instead of suppressing information and arranging private settlements.

On 7 November 2022, he was elected to a three-year term as secretary general of the Bishops' Conference of Indonesia. On 6 October 2024, Pope Francis announced he plans to make Syukur a cardinal on 8 December, a date that was later changed to 7 December. On 22 October 2024, the Holy See Press Office announced that Pope Francis accepted Bishop Syukur's request not to be created a cardinal. On 19 January 2026 Pope Leo XIV accepted his resignation as Bishop of Bogor on 19 January 2026. Christophorus Tri Harsono of Purwokerto was appointed as apostolic administrator until a new bishop is named for Bogor.

== See also ==
- Catholic Church in Indonesia
