= Julianus Kemo Sunarko =

21st-century Indonesian Catholic bishop (1941–2020)

Julianus Kemo Sunarko S.J.
- Bishop emeritus of the Diocese of Purwokerto
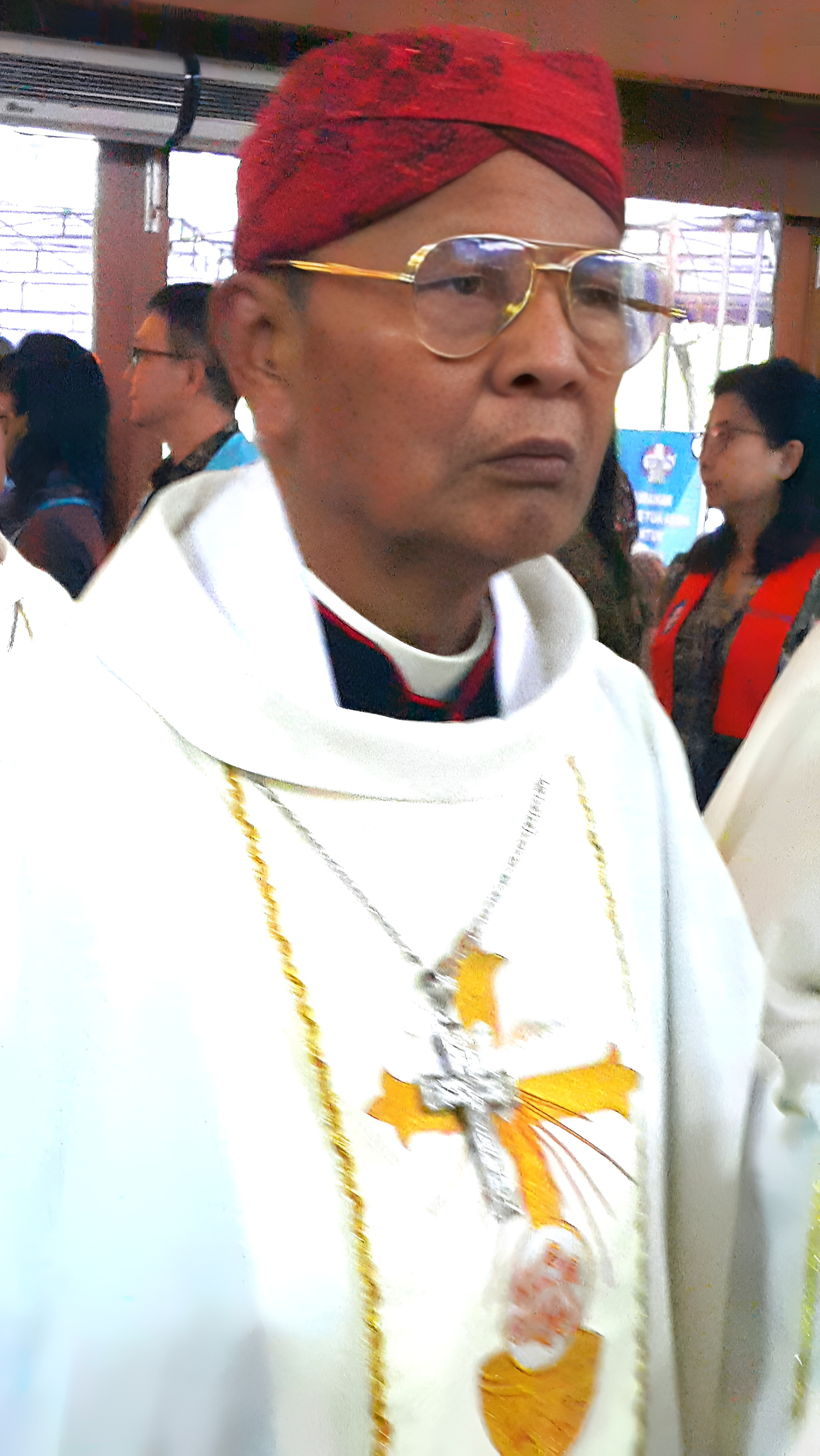
- Sunarko in 2017
- Church: Roman Catholic Church
- Diocese: Diocese of Purwokerto
- In office: 2000–2016
- Predecessor: Paschalis Soedita Hardjasoemarta M.S.C
- Successor: Christophorus Tri Harsono

Orders
- Ordination: 3 December 1975 by Justinus Darmojuwono
- Consecration: 8 September 2000 by Julius Darmaatmadja
- Rank: Bishop

Personal details
- Born: 25 December 1941 Minggir, Sleman Regency, Yogyakarta Region, Dutch East Indies
- Died: 26 June 2020 (aged 78) Elisabeth Hospital, Semarang
- Parents: Elizabeth Veronica Ngadiah Sutodikromo
- Motto: Non mea sed Tua Voluntas fiat (Not my will, but your will – Luke 22:42)

Julianus Kemo Sunarko S.J. (25 December 1941 – 26 June 2020) was an Indonesian Roman Catholic bishop. He was the bishop emeritus of the Roman Catholic Diocese of Purwokerto.

== Biography ==
Sunarko completed his study of philosophy and theology in the Netherlands. He was ordained a priest by Cardinal Justinus Darmojuwono on 3 December 1975 as a member of the Society of Jesus, better known in the Western World as Jesuits. Sunarko gathered a reputation for being skilled in matters of financial management, and after becoming priest he served as treasurer of the Archdiocese of Semarang under Cardinal Julius Darmaatmadja and also Treasurer of the Indonesian Jesuit Province.

On 10 May 2000, it was announced that Sunarko had been nominated as the bishop of Purwokerto, succeeding Paschalis Soedita Hardjasoemarta who had died in May of the previous year. On 8 September of that year Sunarko was ordained bishop of the Diocese of Purwokerto by Cardinal Darmaatmadja.

On 29 December 2016, Sunarko officially retired as the bishop of Purwokerto and submitted his letter of resignation to the Pope, four days after his 75th birthday. He was succeeded by Christophorus Tri Harsono, who was ordained bishop of Purwokerto on 16 October 2018.

After his retirement as bishop Sunarko, as is common for Jesuits, was given a new parish assignment at one of the orders churches, which for Sunarko was in Ungaran. He died on 26 June 2020.
