= Bishops' Conference of Indonesia =

Assembly of Catholic bishops

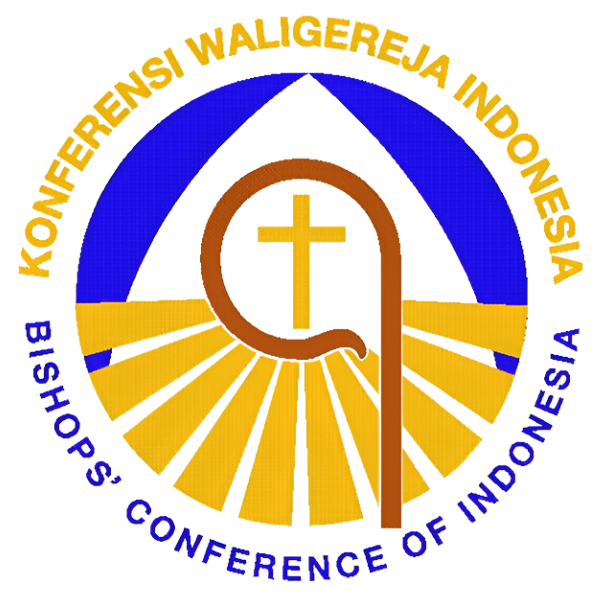
- Abbreviation: BCI (Indonesian:KWI)
- Formation: November 1955
- Type: Episcopal conference
- Legal status: Civil nonprofit
- Purpose: To support the ministry of bishops
- Headquarters: Jakarta, Indonesia
- Region served: Indonesia
- Members: Active Catholic bishops of Indonesia
- Official language: Indonesian
- President: Antonius Subianto Bunjamin
- Affiliations: Federation of Asian Bishops' Conferences
- Website: Official KWI webpage

The Bishops' Conference of Indonesia (BCI; Indonesian: Konferensi Waligereja Indonesia, KWI) is the episcopal conference of the Catholic bishops of Indonesia. It was constituted in November 1955, in Surabaya as the Supreme Council of Indonesian Bishops (MAWI/Majelis Agung Waligereja Indonesia). KWI is a part of the Federation of Asian Bishops' Conferences.

== History ==
Every bishop, since his ordination, in itself a part of the ranks of the world's Bishops (Collegium Episcopale) and together with the bishops all over the world, under the leadership of the Pope, was responsible for the entire Catholic Church.

The bishops in the country together to form a partnership organization called Conference of Bishops. Inside this organization they work to negotiate and decide something about Catholics across the country. A bishop is the head of the local church called the diocese. By doing so he is also called Waligereja. Because of that so the Indonesian Bishops Conference called the Supreme Council of Indonesian Bishops (MAWI) which is then changed to the Bishops' Conference of Indonesia (KWI).

From 1807 until 1902 the Catholic Church throughout the country under the leadership of a Prefect/apostolic vicar based in Batavia. Although some areas since 1902 has been separated from the Apostolic Vicariate of Batavia (1902: Maluku - Irian Jaya, 1905: Borneo, 1911: Sumatra, 1913/1914: Nusa Tenggara, and 1919: Sulawesi), but recognition of the Dutch colonial government to the many Catholic Church leaders in the archipelago just happened in 1913.

Then all Vicar Apostolic Prefect feel that it was necessary to negotiate together to achieve unity in the government attitude towards many issues, but especially relating to freedom for the mission to enter all areas and is also associated with the position of Catholic education.

The meeting occurred on the occasion of the ordination of new bishop. A. Van Velsen as Vicar Apostolic of Jakarta (May 13, 1924) at the Jakarta Cathedral. Were present at that time: Mgr. P. Boss, O.F.M.Cap . (Vicar Apostolic of Kalimantan), Mgr. A. Verstraelen, S.V.D. (Vicar Apostolic of Nusa Tenggara), Mgr. Y. Aerts, M.S.C. (Vicar Apostolic of Maluku - Irian Jaya), Mgr. L.T.M. Brans, O.F.M.Cap. (Prefect Apostolic of Padang) and Mgr. G. Panis, M.S.C. (Prefect Apostolic of Sulawesi).

On September 15 – May 16, 1924 was held the first meeting of Bishops of Nusantara in Jakarta Cathedral. The trial was presided over by Mgr. A. Van Velsen and was attended by the bishops mentioned above plus the two pastors: AHG Brocker, M.S.C. and S.Th. van Hoof, S.J. as a resource.

The second hearing was held on August 31 to September 6, 1925, also in Jakarta, under the leadership of Pope Pius X a messenger named Mgr. B.Y. Gijlswijk, OP, an Apostolic Delegatus in South Africa. Unless the bishops mentioned above, the trial participants has increased by Mgr. H. Smeetes, S.C.J. (Prefect Apostolic of Bengkulu), Mgr. Th. Herkenrat, S.S.C.C. (Prefect Apostolic of Pangkalpinang). Also present Th Fr. De Backere, C.M., Fr Cl. Van de Pas, O.Carm., Father Y. Hoederechts, S.J., being Father H. Jansen, S.J. and Fr Y. Van Baal, S.J. served as secretary.

In this trial it was decided to hold a hearing every five years. The next sessions are: June 4 to 11, 1929 at Muntilan (attended by 10 bishops), 19 to 27 September 1934 at Girisonta (also attended by a priest from Centraal Missie Bureau or the Office of Catholic Bishops), 16–22 August 1939 also in Girisonta (15 bishops and three people from the CMB as well as an Apostolic Delegatus for Australia: Mgr . Y. Panico).

Because of the war, the meeting of the Indonesian Bishops can not be held. On 26–30 April 1954 the Bishops' all over Java hold a meeting in Lawang. There expressed a desire to hold a new conference for all bishops. A draft constitution prepared by Mgr. W. Schoemaker M.S.C. (Bishop Purwokerto) subsequently approved by Internuncio in Jakarta on January 31, 1955. Dated March 14, 1955 Mgr. W. Schoemaker M.S.C. appointed by the Internuncio as the chairman of MAWI for the next meeting.

The meeting can be held on 25 October to 2 November 1955 in Bruderan, Surabaya, and was attended by 22 bishops (of 25 bishops there). This is the meeting of the Conference of Bishops from all over Indonesia, the first after the war.

One important decision is that henceforth the Indonesian bishops' conference is called the Supreme Council of Bishops of Indonesia, abbreviated MAWI, a translation of the Raad van Kerkvoogden. The date is regarded as the founding date MAWI. In addition to the plenary session, it was decided to set up a small meeting that remains, to carry out daily tasks, which is called the Central Indonesian Bishops' Council, abbreviated DEWAP, which is chaired by Mgr. Albertus Soegijapranata, S.J. (Vicar Apostolic of Semarang). To improve the performance of its duties, established various "Committee "/PWI (Indonesian Bishops ' Committee) is a member of DEWAP (decided that DEWAP convene once a year) and that addressing one service area: PWI (Indonesian Bishops' Committee) Social, Catholic and Apostolic Action PWI layman, PWI Seminary and University, Education and Religion PWI, PWI catechesis People and Propagation of the Faith, PWI Press and Propaganda. It was decided that DEWAP convene once a year.

After Indonesia's independence the number of Catholics Indonesia increased considerably. So rapid development of Indonesian Catholic congregation, so that in a meeting in Girisonta, Ungaran, Central Java (9 to 16 May 1960) Indonesian bishops wrote a letter to Pope John XXIII, pleading for him to officially inaugurate the establishment of the Church hierarchy in Indonesia. Then by decree "Quod Christus Adorandus" dated January 3, 1961 Pope John XXIII inaugurated the establishment of the Church hierarchy in Indonesia.

Since 1987, the Supreme Council of Indonesian Bishops (MAWI) renamed the Bishops' Conference of Indonesia (KWI). KWI Leadership held by the Presidium of KWI. In the General Secretariat assembled all officials who helped facilitate the work of the Indonesian bishops' pastoral.

On 15 May 2024, the newly renovated KWI building located in Cut Mutia St., Menteng, Jakarta, was consecrated.

== Objectives ==
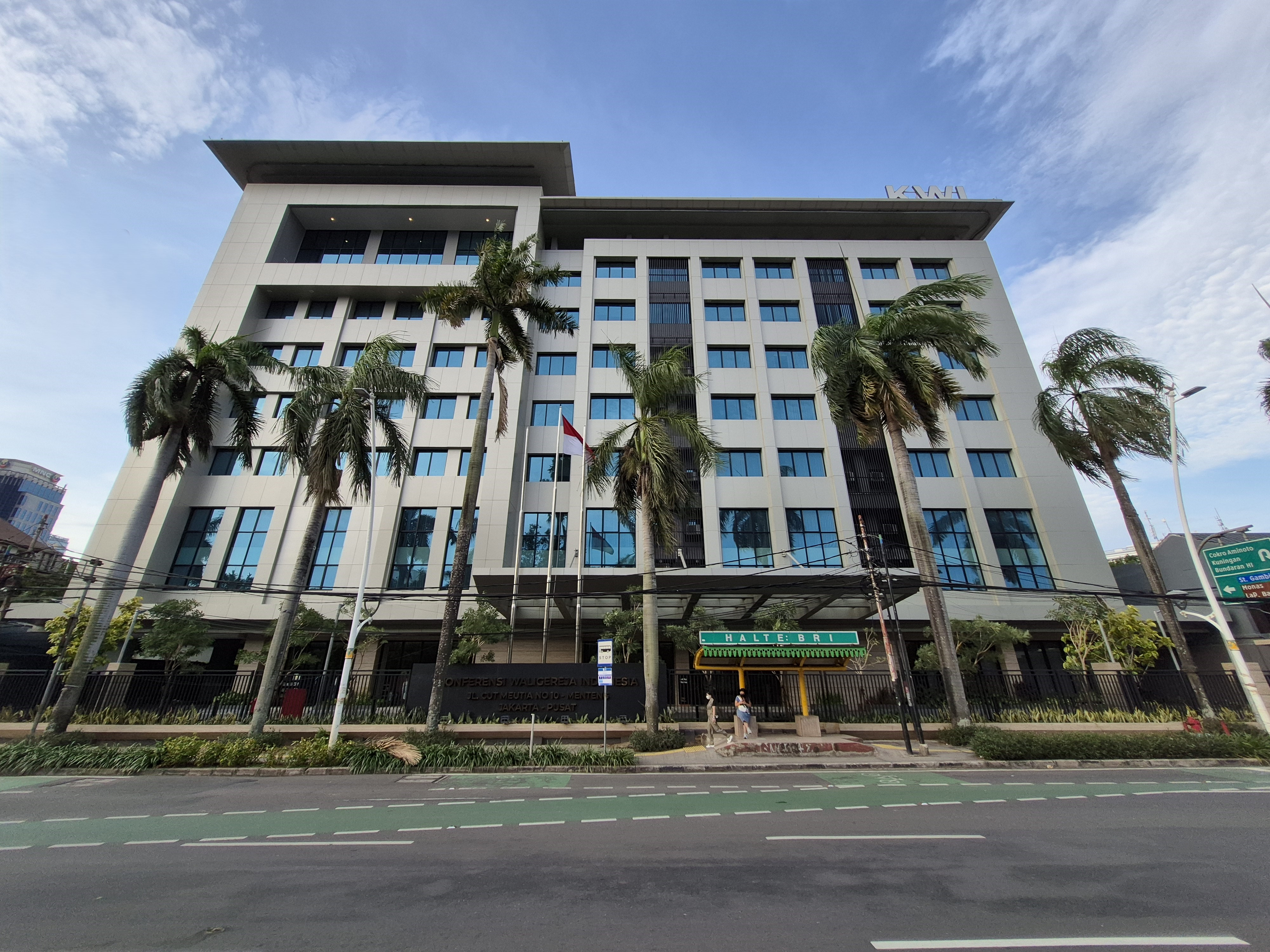
Headquarters of the Indonesian Bishops' Conference (2024)

KWI is a Federation of The Catholic Bishops, of Indonesia, which aims to promote unity and cooperation in their pastoral duties to lead Catholics in Indonesia. KWI is not "above" or supervises bishops, each bishop remains autonomous. KWI does not have branches in the area.

== Members ==
The conference has 38 members—one bishop in each of the 38 dioceses in Indonesia. All bishops in Indonesia are members of KWI, except for the retired bishops.

== Organization structure ==
=== Board ===
President : Mgr. Antonius Subianto Bunyamin, OSC

Vice President : Mgr. Adrianus Sunarko, OFM

Vice President II : Mgr. Robertus Rubiyatmoko

Secretary General : Mgr. Paskalis Bruno Syukur, OFM

Treasurer : Mgr. Yustinus Harjosusanto, MSF

Members : Adrianus Sunarko, O.F.M. (Pangkalpinang) Agustinus Agus (Pontianak) Aloysius Maryadi Sutrisnaatmaka, M.S.F. (Palangka Raya) Aloysius Murwito, O.F.M. (Agats) Antonius Subianto Bunjamin, O.S.C. (Bandung) Benedictus Estephanus Rolly Untu, M.S.C. (Manado) Christophorus Tri Harsono (Purwokerto) Dominikus Saku (Atambua) Edmund Woga, C.SS.R. (Weetebula) Ewaldus Martinus Sedu (Maumere) Fransiskus Kopong Kung (Larantuka) Fransiskus Nipa (Koajutor Makassar) Fransiskus Tuaman Sasfo Sinaga (Sibolga) Henricus Pidyarto Gunawan, O. Carm. (Malang) Hilarion Datus Lega (Manokwari–Sorong) Hironimus Pakaenoni (Kupang) Ignatius Kardinal Suharyo Hardjoatmodjo (Jakarta & Military Ordinariate Indonesia) Johannes Liku Ada' (Makassar) Kornelius Sipayung, O.F.M. Cap. (Medan) Maksimus Regus (Labuan Bajo) Paskalis Bruno Syukur, O.F.M. (Bogor) Paulinus Yan Olla, M.S.F. (UskupTanjung Selor) Paulus Budi Kleden, S.V.D. (Ende) Petrus Canisius Mandagi, M.S.C. (Merauke) Pius Riana Prapdi (Ketapang) Robertus Rubiyatmoko (Semarang) Samuel Oton Sidin, O.F.M. Cap. (Sintang) Seno Ngutra (Amboina) Silvester Tung Kiem San (Denpasar) Siprianus Hormat (Ruteng) Valentinus Saeng, C.P. (Sanggau) Victorius Dwiardy, O.F.M. Cap. (Banjarmasin) Vinsensius Setiawan Triatmojo (Tanjungkarang) Vitus Rubianto Solichin, S.X. (Padang) Yanuarius Teofilus Matopai You (Jayapura) Yohanes Harun Yuwono (Palembang) Yustinus Harjosusanto, M.S.F. (Samarinda)

=== Chairmen of the Commissions ===
1. Commission for Ecumenical and Interreligious Dialogue : Mgr. P.C.Mandagi MSC
2. Commission for Mission : Mgr. Edmund Woga CSSR
3. Commission for Catechetics : Mgr. John Liku Ada
4. Commission for Justice and Peace : Mgr. Agustinus Agus
5. Commission for Family : Mgr. Frans Kopong Kung
6. Commission for the Laity : Mgr. Yustinus Harjosusanto MSF
7. Commission for Social Communications : Mgr. Petrus Turang
8. Commission for Liturgy : Mgr. Aloysius Sutrisnaatmaka MSF
9. Commission for Migrants and Itinerant : Mgr. Agustinus Agus
10. Commission for Education : Mgr. Martinus Dogma Situmorang
11. Commission for Socio Economic Development : Mgr. Hilarion Datus Lega
12. Commission for Seminary : Mgr. Dominikus Saku
13. Commission for Youth : Mgr. John Philipus Saklil
14. Commission for Theology : Mgr. Petrus Boddeng Timang

=== Delegates ===
1. Delegate for Catholic Health Services : Mgr. Hubertus Leteng
2. Delegate for The Catholic Bible Institution : Mgr. Vincentius Sensi Potokota
3. Head of Inter-diocese Solidarity Fund (DSAK) : Mgr. H. Datus Lega
4. KWI representative for BKBLII : Mgr. Hilarius Moa Nurak SVD
5. Moderator of Gender Secretariat and Empowerment of Women : Mgr. Vincentius Sutikno

=== Monetary Council ===
Chairman : Mgr. Silvester San

Member I : Mgr. H. Datus Lega

Member II : Mgr. Giulio Mencuccini CP

== Archdioceses and Dioceses ==
=== Region of Sumatra ===
Ecclesiastical Province of Medan

- Archdiocese of Medan
  - Diocese of Sibolga
  - Diocese of Padang

Ecclesiastical Province of Palembang

- Archdiocese of Palembang
  - Diocese of Pangkal-Pinang
  - Diocese of Tanjungkarang

=== Region of Java ===
Ecclesiastical Province of Jakarta

- Archdiocese of Jakarta
  - Diocese of Bandung
  - Diocese of Bogor

Ecclesiastical Province of Semarang

- Archdiocese of Semarang
  - Diocese of Malang
  - Diocese of Purwokerto
  - Diocese of Surabaya

=== Region of Kalimantan ===
Ecclesiastical Province of Pontianak

- Archdiocese of Pontianak
  - Diocese of Ketapang
  - Diocese of Sanggau
  - Diocese of Sintang

Ecclesiastical Province of Samarinda

- Archdiocese of Samarinda
  - Diocese of Banjarmasin
  - Diocese of Palangkaraya
  - Diocese of Tanjung Selor

=== Ecclesiastical Province of Makassar-Amboina-Manado (MAM) ===
Ecclesiastical Province of Makassar

- Archdiocese of Makassar
  - Diocese of Amboina
  - Diocese of Manado

=== Region of Nusa Tenggara ===
Ecclesiastical Province of Ende

- Archdiocese of Ende
  - Diocese of Denpasar
  - Diocese of Labuan Bajo
  - Diocese of Larantuka
  - Diocese of Maumere
  - Diocese of Ruteng

Ecclesiastical Province of Kupang

- Archdiocese of Kupang
  - Diocese of Atambua
  - Diocese of Weetebula

=== Ecclesiastical Province of Papua ===
Ecclesiastical Province of Merauke

- Archdiocese of Merauke
  - Diocese of Agats
  - Diocese of Jayapura
  - Diocese of Manokwari-Sorong
  - Diocese of Timika

== See also ==
- Communion of Churches in Indonesia
- Christianity in Indonesia
- Catholic Church in Indonesia
