= Christophorus Tri Harsono =

20th and 21st-century Indonesian Catholic bishop

- Bishop of the Diocese of Purwokerto
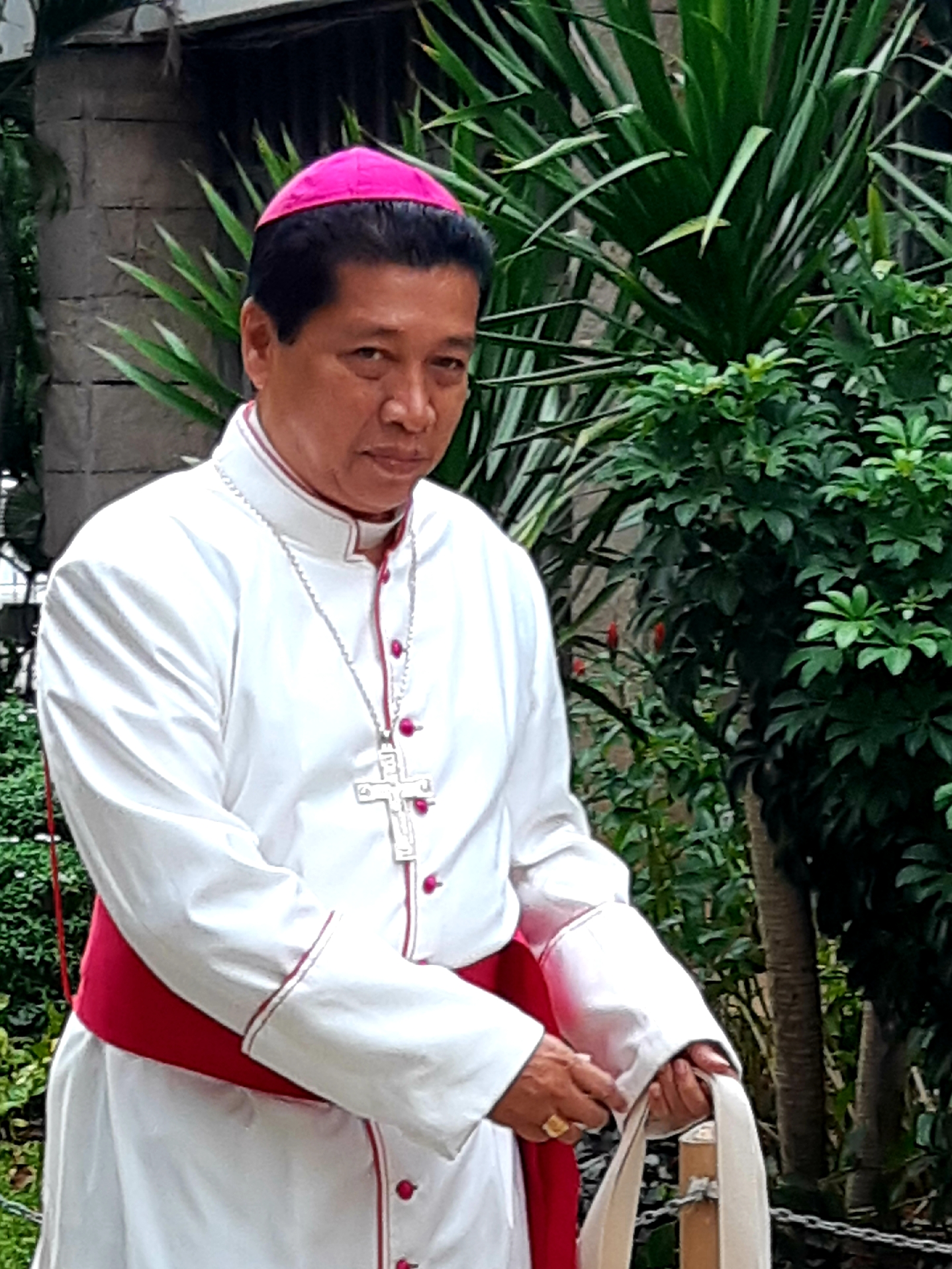
- Tri Harsono in 2018
- Church: Roman Catholic Church
- Diocese: Diocese of Purwokerto
- In office: 2018–
- Predecessor: Julianus Kemo Sunarko

Orders
- Ordination: 5 February 1995 by Cosmas Michael Angkur O.F.M.
- Consecration: 16 October 2018 by Robertus Rubiyatmoko
- Rank: Bishop

Personal details
- Born: 18 January 1966 (age 60) Bogor, West Java, Indonesia
- Motto: Fiat mihi secundum verbum Tuum (Happen to me according to your word – Luke 1:38)

Christophorus Tri Harsono (born 18 January 1966) is an Indonesian Roman Catholic bishop.

== Biography ==
Tri Harsono was born to a military family with his father a member of the air force. Tri Harsono was educated at Stella Maris Middle Seminary in his home city of Bogor for four years. He then proceed to the Major Seminary of St. Peter and St. Paul in Bandung, and afterwards conducted a study of philosophy and theology at Parahyangan Catholic University, also in the city of Bandung. On 5 February 1995, Tri Harsono was ordained a priest of the Roman Catholic Diocese of Bogor, by then-bishop Cosmas Michael Angkur O.F.M.

Tri Harsono's first assignment after being ordained was being the pastor at the Immaculate Maria Parish in Rangkasbitung, until 1996, after which he joined the advisory staff at his alma mater, Stella Maris Intermediate Seminary, in Bogor until 1998. He then undertook Arabic language and cultural studies at the Dar Comboni Institute for Arabic Studies in Cairo, Egypt in the first year and continued at the Pontifical Institute of Arab and Islamic Studies in Rome, Italy.

On 14 July 2018 it was announced that Tri Harsono would be the new leader of the Diocese of Purokerto following the retiring of bishop Julianus Kemo Sunarko. Tri Harsono was consecrated bishop of Purwokerto by archbishop Robertus Rubiyatmoko on 16 October 2018, becoming the first bishop Rubyatmoko had consecrated since becoming archbishop. Bishops Henricus Pidyarto Gunawan and Paskalis Bruno Syukur where the co-consecrators of the event, and Apostolic Nuncio Piero Pioppo as well as 35 bishops from all over Indonesia were in attendance.
