= Johannes Pujasumarta =

- Archbishop of Semarang
- Church: Catholic Church
- Archdiocese: Archdiocese of Semarang
- In office: 12 November 2010 – 10 November 2015
- Predecessor: Ignatius Suharyo Hardjoatmodjo
- Successor: Robertus Rubiyatmoko
- Previous post: Bishop of Bandung (2008-2010)

Orders
- Ordination: 25 June 1977
- Consecration: 16 July 2008 by Julius Darmaatmadja

Personal details
- Born: Johannes Maria Trilaksyanta Pujasumarta; 27 December 1949 Surakarta, Central Java, State of the Republic of Indonesia, United States of Indonesia
- Died: 10 November 2015 (aged 65) Semarang, Central Java, Indonesia

Johannes Maria Trilaksyanta Pujasumarta (27 December 1949 in Surakarta - 10 November 2015 in Semarang) was a Roman Catholic archbishop.

Ordained to the priesthood in 1977, Pujasumarta was named bishop of the Roman Catholic Diocese of Bandung, Indonesia in 2008. In 2010, he was named archbishop of the Roman Catholic Archdiocese of Semarang; Pujasumarta died while still in office.

== Notes ==
Catholic Church titles
| Preceded by Alexander Djajasiswaja | Bishop of Bandung; 2008–2010 | Succeeded by Antonius Subianto Bunjamin, O.S.C. |
| Preceded by Ignatius Suharyo | Archbishop of Semarang; 2010–2015 | Succeeded by Robertus Rubiyatmoko |
