= Robertus Rubiyatmoko =

21st-century Indonesian Catholic bishop

- Archbishop of the Archdiocese of Semarang
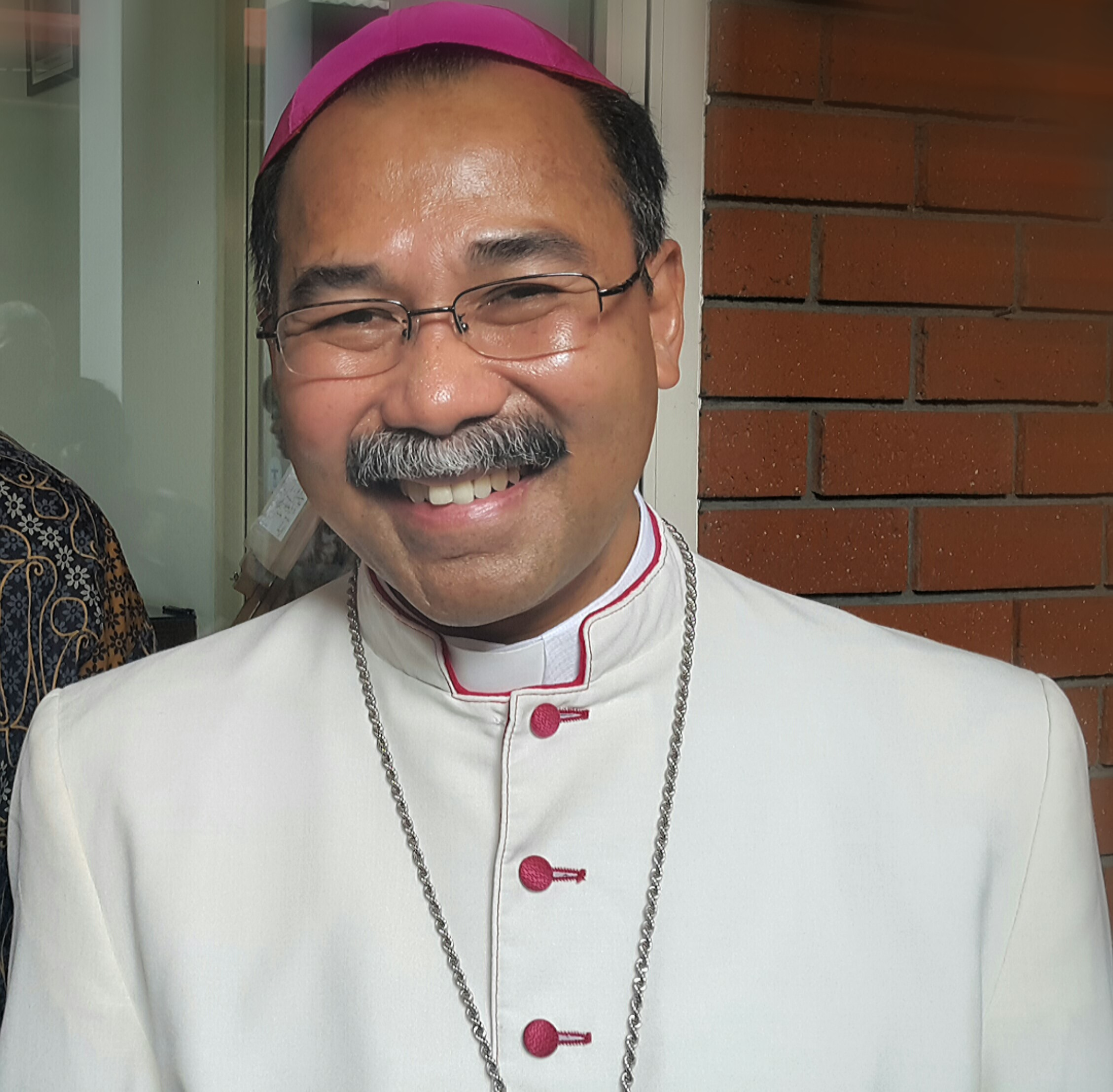
- Rubiyatmoko in 2017
- Church: Roman Catholic Church
- Archdiocese: Archdiocese of Semarang
- In office: 2017–
- Predecessor: Johannes Pujasumarta
- Previous post: Priest

Orders
- Ordination: 12 August 1992
- Consecration: 19 May 2017 by Ignatius Suharyo Hardjoatmodjo
- Rank: Archbishop

Personal details
- Born: 10 October 1963 (age 62) Sleman Regency, Yogyakarta, Indonesia
- Motto: Quaerere et Salvum Facere (Seek and Save – Luke 19:10)
- Coat of arms

Robertus Rubiyatmoko, J.C.D. (born 10 October 1963) is an Indonesian Roman Catholic archbishop.

== Personal life ==
Rubiyatmoko was born in a Roman Catholic family to Stanislaus Harjo Partono and Elizabeth Harjo Partono. Early on in life he developed his signature mustache, which he was asked to shave at the ordination to the priesthood, but which Bishop Hardjoatmodjo jokingly told him at his appointment to archbishop to keep the mustache or else no one would recognize him.

Rubiyatmoko entered the Seminary in 1983 at Truth of Saint Peter Canisius Mertoyudan. He graduated from the seminary he continued his study of philosophy and theology at the Pontifical Theology Faculty in Yogyakarta. He was ordained a priest on 12 August 1992 by cardinal Julius Darmaatmadja S.J. as priest of the Archdiocese of Semarang.

He then obtained a degree in church law from the Pontifical Gregorian University, in Rome, Italy. After completing doctoral studies, Rubiyatmoko taught Church law at the Pontifical Theological Faculty of Wedabhakti, part of the Jesuit college Sanata Dharma University in Yogyakarta. During this time from 2004 to 2011 he was also one of the formators at the Santo Paulus Kentungan High Seminary, Yogyakarta. From 2011 until his ordination as bishop he was also the Judicial Vicar of the Archdiocese of Semarang.

== Archbishop ==
On 18 March 2017 it was announced that Rubiyatmoko had been chosen as the new archbishop of the Archdiocese of Semarang, replacing the deceased Most Reverend Johannes Pujasumarta who had died two years earlier. The following day Rubiyatmoko was ordained archbishop by Suharyo Hardjoatmodjo was installed as the leader of the Archdiocese of Semarang.

Rubiyatmoko was the principal consecrator of the ordination of Bishop Most Reverend Christophorus Tri Harsono on 16 October 2018, being the first bishop Rubyatmoko had consecrated since becoming archbishop. Bishops Henricus Pidyarto Gunawan and Paskalis Bruno Syukur where the co-consecrators of the event, and Apostolic Nuncio Piero Pioppo as well as 35 bishops from all over Indonesia were in attendance.
