= Blessed Virgin Mary Cathedral, Bogor =

Catholic church in Indonesia

Coordinates: 6.5970°S 106.7932°E

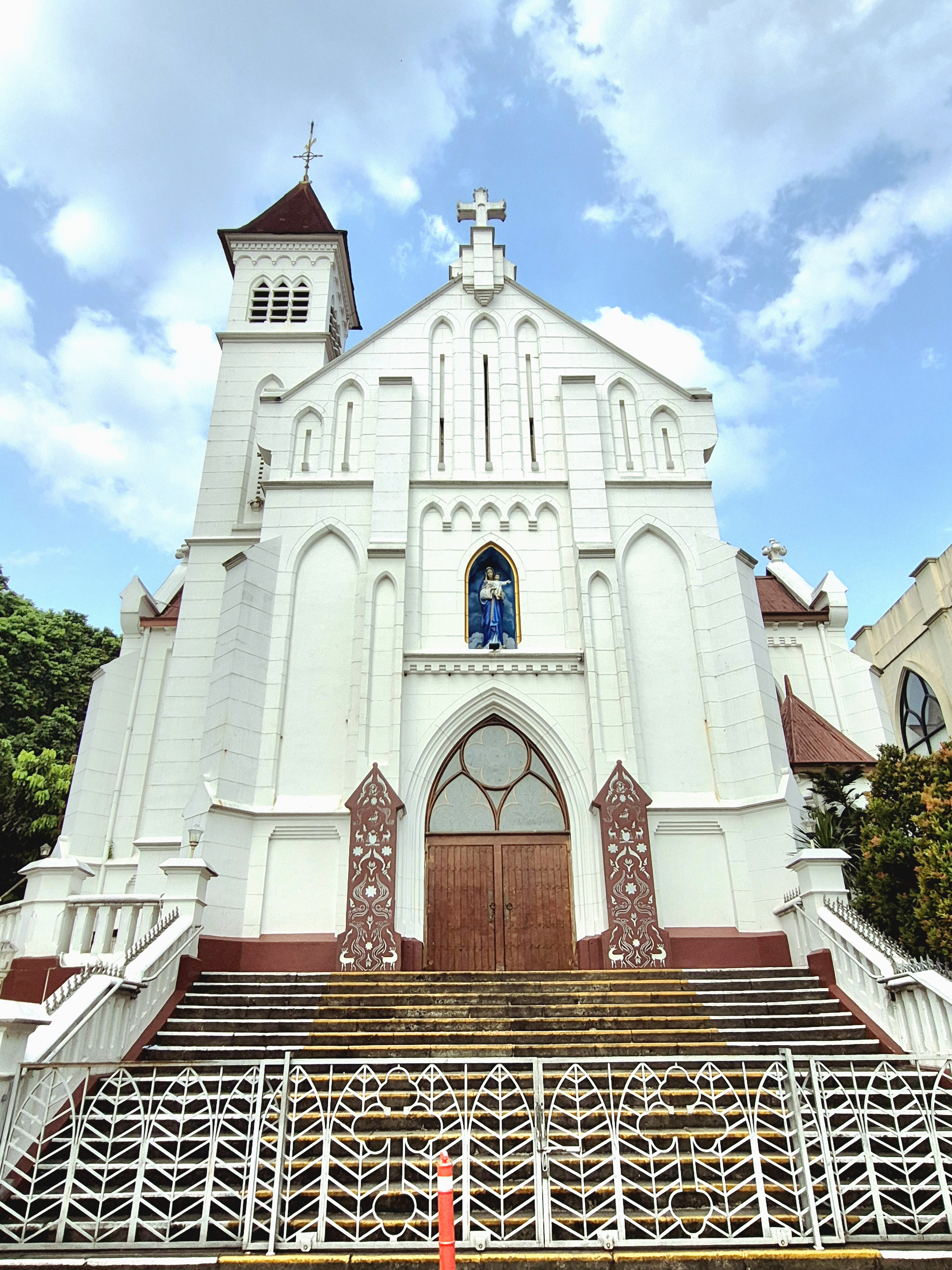
Bogor Cathedral in 2026.

Bogor Cathedral, officially called the Gereja Beatae Mariae Virginis (Indonesian: Gereja Santa Perawan Maria), is a historic and oldest church building in the Bogor Diocese in Bogor, West Java, Indonesia.

A church in Buitenzorg (the Dutch name for the area) in 1894 served both Protestants and Catholics. The cathedral was built in 1905. During World War II, the cathedral was damaged in 1945.

== History ==
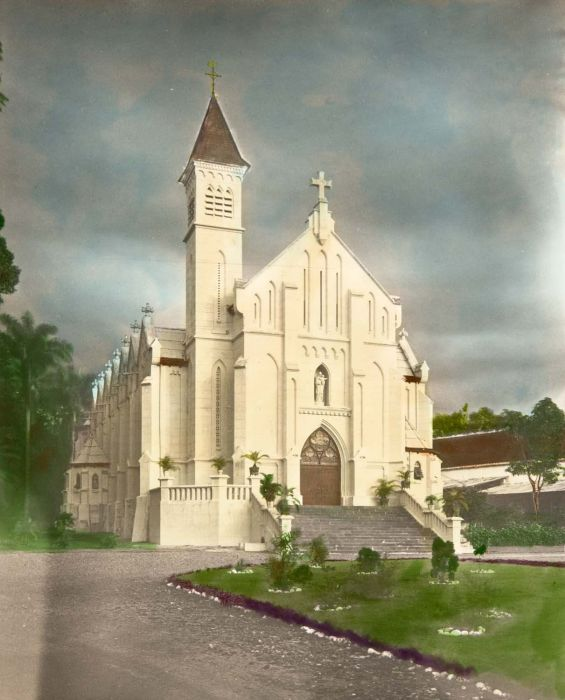
Bogor Cathedral (c. 1920-30)

The early history of the founding of the Bogor Cathedral Church is related to the role of two pioneering figures of the people of the city of Bogor, namely Mgr. Adam Claessens Archbishop of Batavia and his younger brother R.D. M.Y.D. Claessens.

In 1881, Mgr. Claessens bought a house with a fairly large yard (now including the Church complex, Rectory, seminary, school, and Budi Mulia Brotherhood). Initially, the place was used as a resting place and for holding Holy Mass for guests from Jakarta, after being built, this rest house was then also used as a place for holding Mass for the people, both Protestant and Catholic Christians, from Batavia who were visiting Bogor, in other words, the house of worship built by AC Claessens was not only exclusive for Catholics, even Chinese traders who were traveling and native residents who were mostly Muslim often used this house as a resting place.

In 1886 MYD. Claessen began his pastoral work to establish an orphanage for children. At that time the orphanage building could only accommodate 6 children. The pastoral effort was then developed into the Vincentius Foundation in 1887, so that in 1888 it received recognition from the Dutch East Indies Government.

In 1889 the Dutch East Indies Government officially recognized and declared that Bogor became a permanent mission station Batavia. In 1896 (a year after Bishop AC Claessen died), MYD Claessens began building a magnificent church building on land where a rest house and orphanage had been built. That church is what is now known as the Bogor Cathedral Church.

In 1907 Father MYD. Claessens returned to the Netherlands after 30 years of work in Bogor, West Java, 27 years later, in 1934, he died at the age of 82. Since the departure of Father Claessens, the permanent mission station in Bogor was handled by Father Anton van Velsen, In 1924, Father Antonius Van Velsen was appointed as Archbishop of Batavia, so that Bogor, which at that time had become a Parish, was handed over to Father OFM Conventual.

In November 1957, the Bogor Parish was separated from the Apostolic Vicariate of Batavia and merged with the Apostolic Prefecture of Sukabumi.

In 1961, the Apostolic Prefecture of Sukabumi was upgraded to a Diocese with the name Roman Catholic Diocese of Bogor. The Bogor Parish Church then became the Cathedral Church of the Diocese of Bogor. Thus, the name of the Bogor Parish changed to the Bogor Cathedral Parish.

== Architecture ==
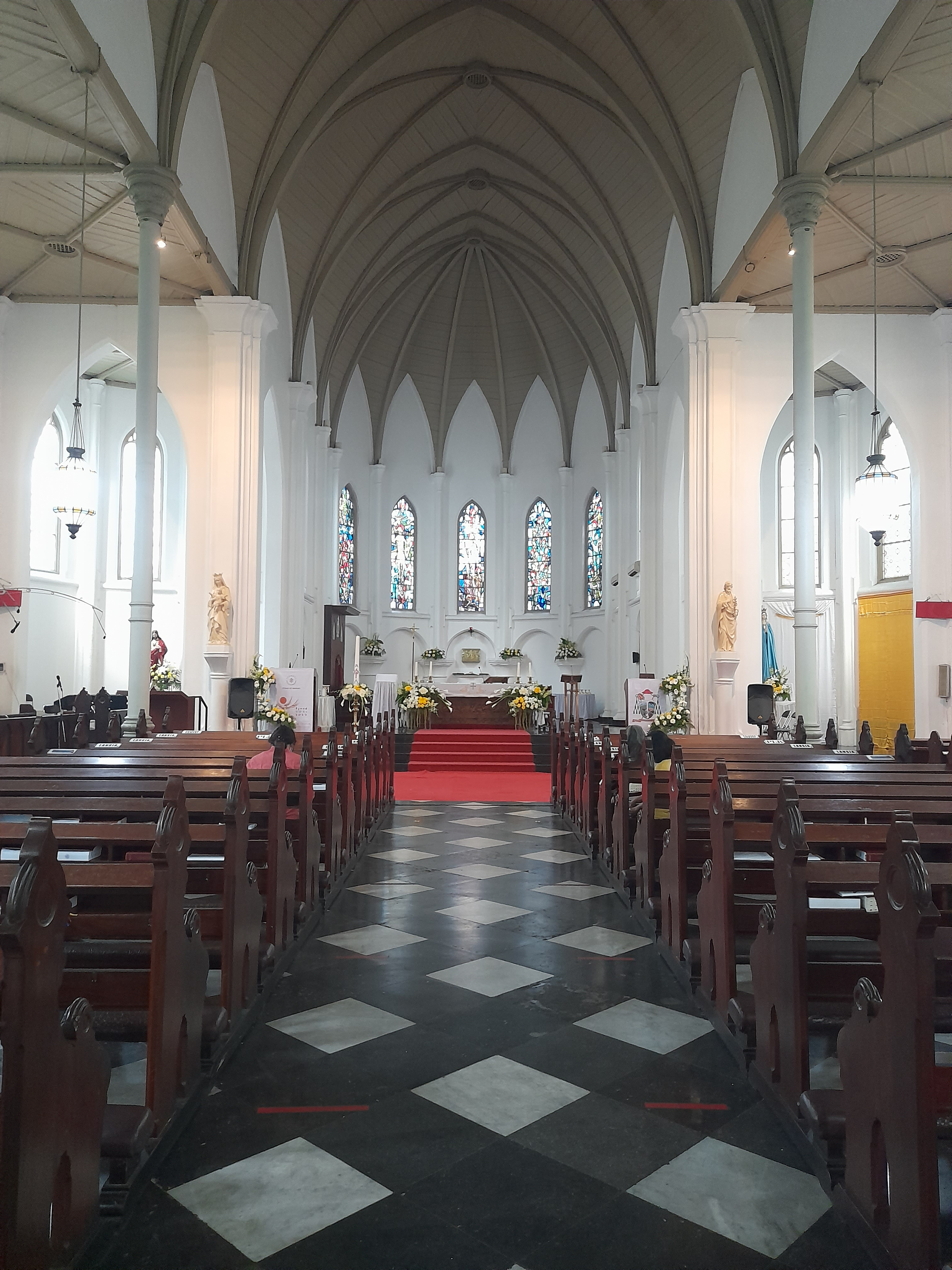
Interior

The authenticity is maintained even though it is hundreds of years old, the authenticity of the architectural design of the Bogor Cathedral Church is maintained. This church is located in a complex consisting of several buildings, such as the seminary and brotherhood school buildings. This building has the characteristic Neo-Gothic style architecture that was famous in the 19th century in Europe, which is still clearly visible in the church and brotherhood or seminary buildings.

The Bogor Cathedral Church itself is a fairly tall building supported by thick walls typical of past buildings that make it look very sturdy and sturdy. There is also a tower which is the highest part of the church. The various arches and pillars also make the atmosphere around it like being in Europe in the past, especially a statue of a woman carrying a small child right above the door. It is known that the statue symbolizes the Virgin Mary which makes this church also known as the Church of the Virgin Mary. At the top of this church there is actually a statue of a chicken, which is the same as the Zebaoth Church in Bogor. The chicken statue at the top of this church building is a characteristic of Europe at that time.
