= Antonius Subianto Bunjamin =

Indonesian catholic bishop

His Excellency, The Most Reverend Antonius Subianto Bunjamin OSC
- Bishop of Bandung; President of the Bishops' Conference of Indonesia
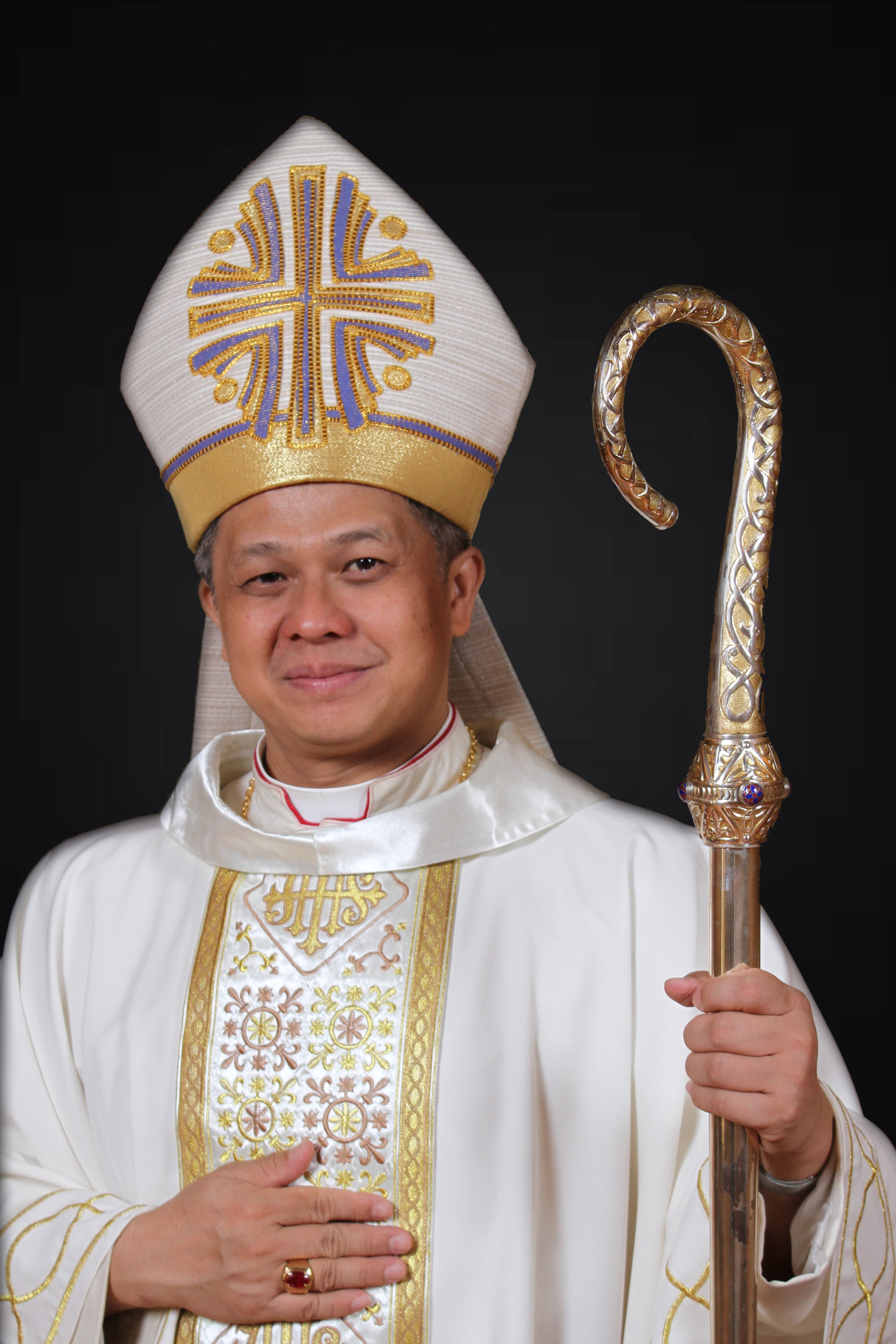
- Diocese: Bandung
- Appointed: 3 June 2014
- Installed: 25 August 2014
- Predecessor: Johannes Pujasumarta

Orders
- Ordination: 26 June 1996 by Alexander Djajasiswaja
- Consecration: 25 August 2014 by Ignatius Suharyo Hardjoatmodjo

Personal details
- Born: 14 February 1968 (age 58) Bandung, Indonesia
- Education: Parahyangan Catholic University (BPhil); KU Leuven (Ph.L.); Pontifical Lateran University (DPhil)
- Motto: Ut diligatis invicem (Latin for 'So that you love one another')

Antonius Subianto Bunjamin OSC (born 14 February 1968) is an Indonesian Catholic prelate who has served as bishop of Bandung since 2014. He has also been the president of the Bishops' Conference of Indonesia since 2022, having previously served as its secretary general from 2015 to 2022.

Ordained to the priesthood in 1996, Bunjamin was named bishop of the Roman Catholic Diocese of Bandung, Indonesia in 2014 succeeding Johannes Pujasumarta.

The Vatican appointed Bunjamin as Apostolic Visitator to the Roman Catholic Diocese of Ruteng in 2017, and to the Archdiocese of Merauke in 2019.

== Background ==
Bunjamin was born on 14 February 1968 in Bandung, West Java. When he was a child, he was nicknamed beke, a Sundanese word which means short, because compared to his friends, Bunyamin was short. He grew up in the Parish of Santa Odilia, Cicadas.

== Notes ==
Catholic Church titles
| Preceded by Johannes Pujasumarta | Bishop of Bandung; 2014–present | Incumbent |
