= Cosmas Michael Angkur =

Indonesian Roman Catholic bishop (1937–2024)

His Excellency Cosmas Michael Angkur OFM
- Bishop Emeritus of Bogor
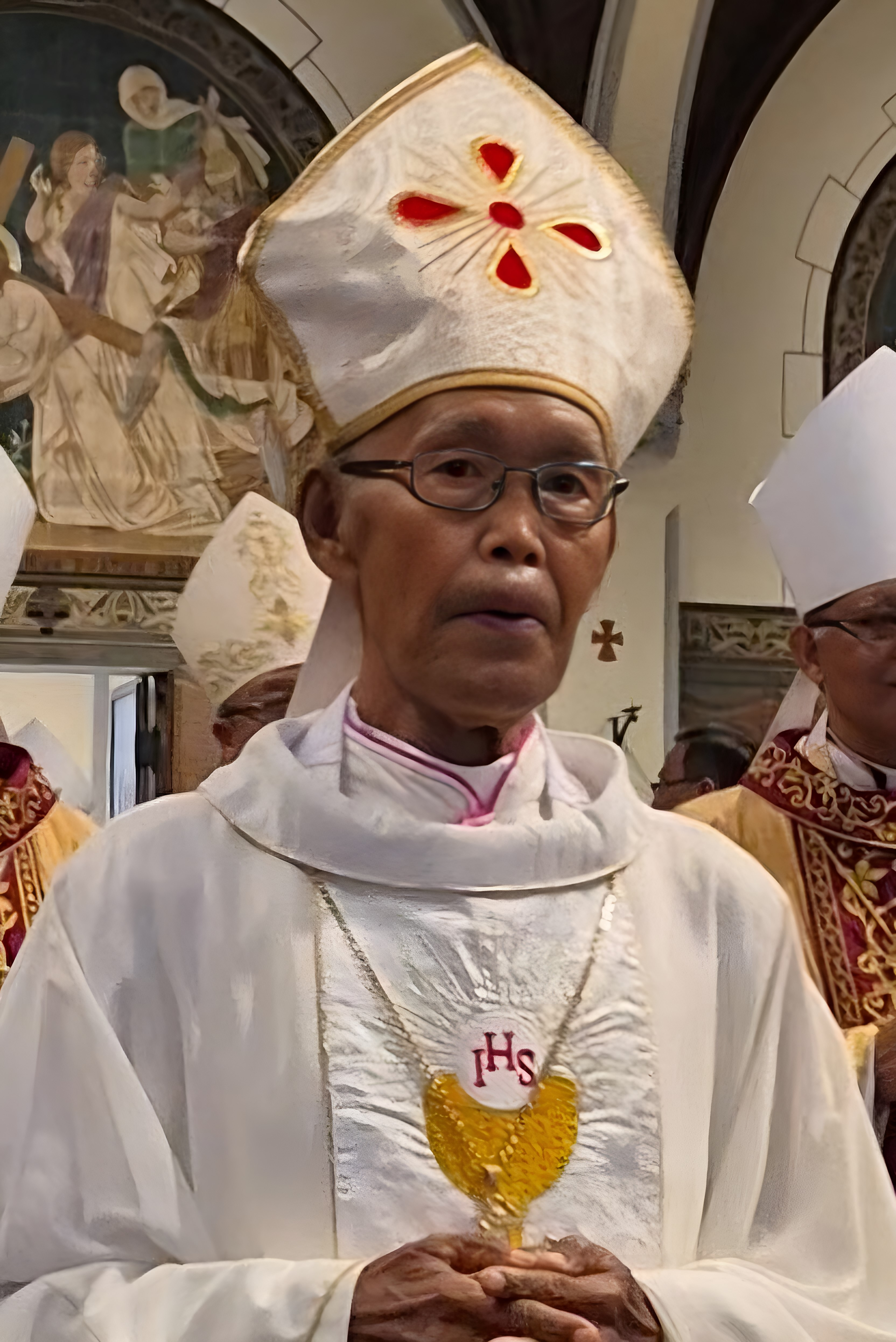
- Angkur in November 2024
- Archdiocese: Jakarta
- Diocese: Bogor
- Appointed: 10 June 1994
- Term ended: 21 November 2013
- Predecessor: Ignatius Harsono
- Successor: Paskalis Bruno Syukur

Orders
- Ordination: 14 July 1967 by Paternus Nicholas Joannes Cornelius Geise
- Consecration: 23 October 1994 by Leo Soekoto

Personal details
- Born: 4 January 1937 Lewur, Timor and Dependencies Residency, Dutch East Indies
- Died: 18 December 2024 (aged 87)

Cosmas Michael Angkur (4 January 1937 – 18 December 2024) was an Indonesian Roman Catholic bishop.

Ordained to the priesthood on 14 July 1967, Angkur was named bishop of the Roman Catholic Diocese of Bogor, Indonesia on 10 June 1994 and retired on 21 November 2013.

Angkur died on 18 December 2024, at the age of 87.

Catholic Church titles
Preceded by Ignatius Harsono	Bishop of Bogor; 1994–2013	Succeeded by Paskalis Bruno Syukur
