= Military Ordinariate of Indonesia =

Latin Catholic ecclesiastical jurisdiction in Indonesia

Military Ordinariate of Indonesia Ordinariatus Castrensis Indonesia Ordinariat Militer Indonesia

Catholic
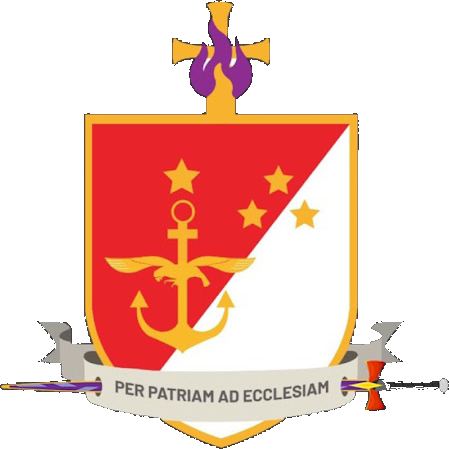
- Coat of arms

Location
- Country: Indonesia
- Territory: Personnel of the Indonesian National Armed Forces and the Indonesian National Police throughout Indonesia
- Ecclesiastical province: Immediately subject to the Holy See
- Coordinates: 6.1667°S 106.8170°E

Information
- Denomination: Catholic Church
- Sui iuris church: Latin Church
- Rite: Roman Rite
- Established: 25 December 1949; 76 years ago
- Cathedral: Jakarta Cathedral
- Patron saint: Saint John of Capistrano
- Language: Indonesian language

Current leadership
- Pope: Leo XIV
- Military Ordinary: Ignatius Suharyo
- Vicar General: Col. Yos Bintoro

Map

The Military Ordinariate of Indonesia is a military ordinariate of the Catholic Church. Immediately subject to the Holy See, it provides pastoral care to Catholics serving in the Indonesian National Armed Forces and Indonesian National Police and their families.

== History ==
It was established as a military vicariate on 25 December 1949 and elevated to a military ordinariate on 21 July 1986.

== Leadership ==
=== Military vicars ===
- Albertus Soegijapranata, S.J. (25 December 1949 – 23 July 1963, died)
- Justinus Darmojuwono (8 July 1964 – 31 December 1983, retired)
- Julius Darmaatmadja, S.J. (28 April 1984 – 21 July 1986, elevated)

=== Military ordinaries ===
- Julius Darmaatmadja, S.J. (21 July 1986 – 2 January 2006, resigned)
- Ignatius Suharyo (incumbent, appointed 2 January 2006)
