= Diocese of Bogor =

Roman Catholic diocese on Java, Indonesia

Coordinates: 6.5833°S 106.8000°E

Diocese of Bogor Dioecesis Bogorensis Keuskupan Bogor
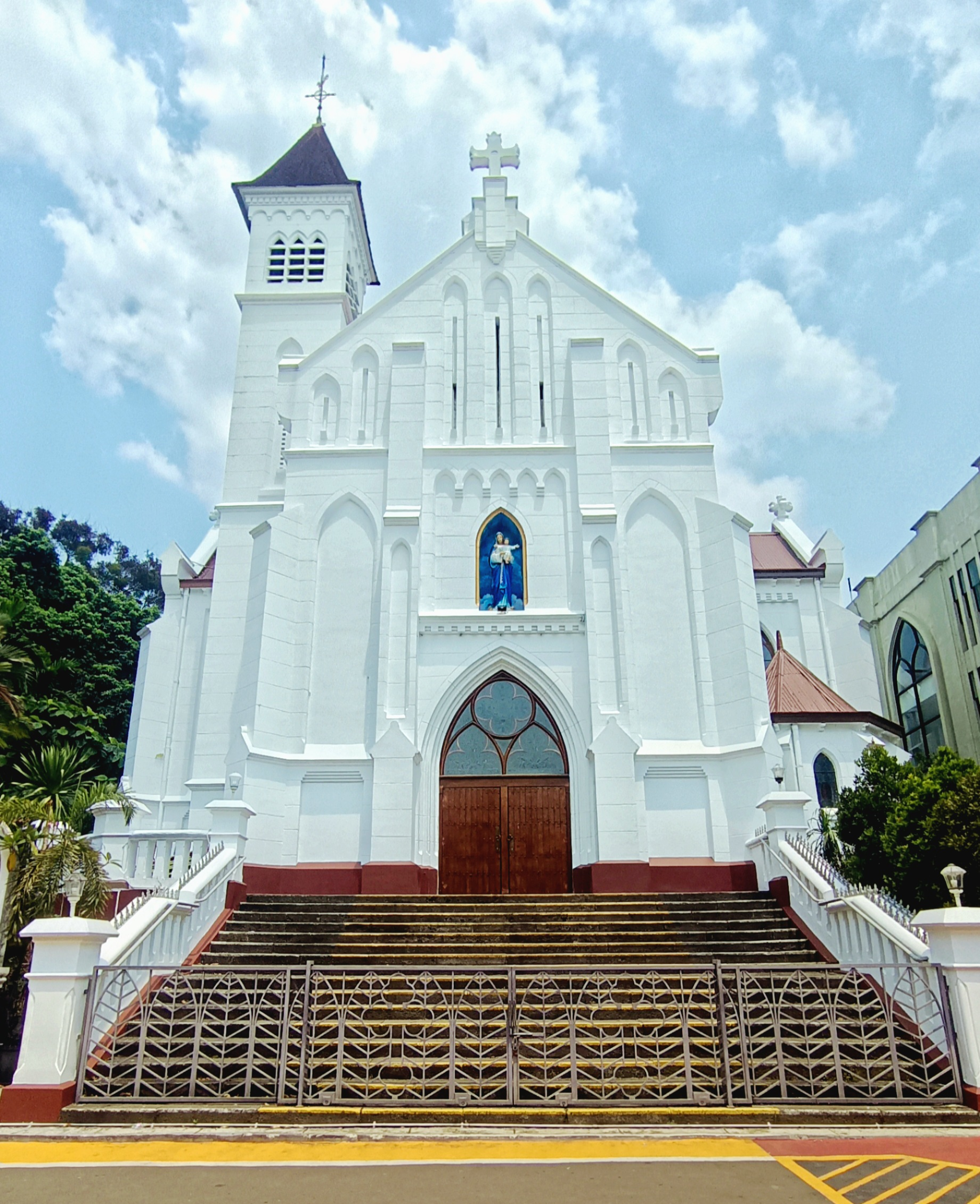
- Bogor Cathedral

Location
- Country: Indonesia
- Ecclesiastical province: Jakarta
- Metropolitan: Jakarta

Statistics
- Area: 18,368 km^{2} (7,092 sq mi)
- Population: Total; Catholics: (as of 2012); 16,283,000; 83,406 (0.5%)
- Parishes: 21

Information
- Rite: Latin Rite
- Cathedral: Cathedral of the Blessed Virgin Mary in Bogor

Current leadership
- Pope: Leo XIV
- Bishop: sede vacante
- Apostolic Administrator: Mgr Christophorus Tri Harsono

Website
- Website of the Diocese

The Roman Catholic Diocese of Bogor (Latin: Bogoren(sis)) is a diocese located in the city of Bogor in the ecclesiastical province of Jakarta in Indonesia.

== History ==
- 9 December 1948: Established as the Apostolic Prefecture of Sukabumi from the Apostolic Vicariate of Batavia
- 3 January 1961: Promoted as Diocese of Bogor

== Leadership ==
- Bishops of Bogor (Roman rite)
  - Bishop Paskalis Bruno Syukur, O.F.M. (21 November 2013 − 19 January 2026)
  - Bishop Cosmas Michael Angkur, O.F.M. (10 June 1994 – 21 November 2013)
  - Bishop Ignatius Harsono (30 January 1975 – 17 July 1993)
  - Bishop Paternus Nicholas Joannes Cornelius Geise, O.F.M. (3 January 1961 – 30 January 1975)
- Prefects Apostolic of Sukabumi (Roman Rite)
  - Fr. Paternus Nicholas Joannes Cornelius Geise, O.F.M. (later Bishop) (17 December 1948 – 3 January 1961)
