= Diocese of Purwokerto =

Roman Catholic diocese in Central Java, Indonesia

Diocese of Purwokerto Dioecesis Purvokertensis Keuskupan Purwokerto
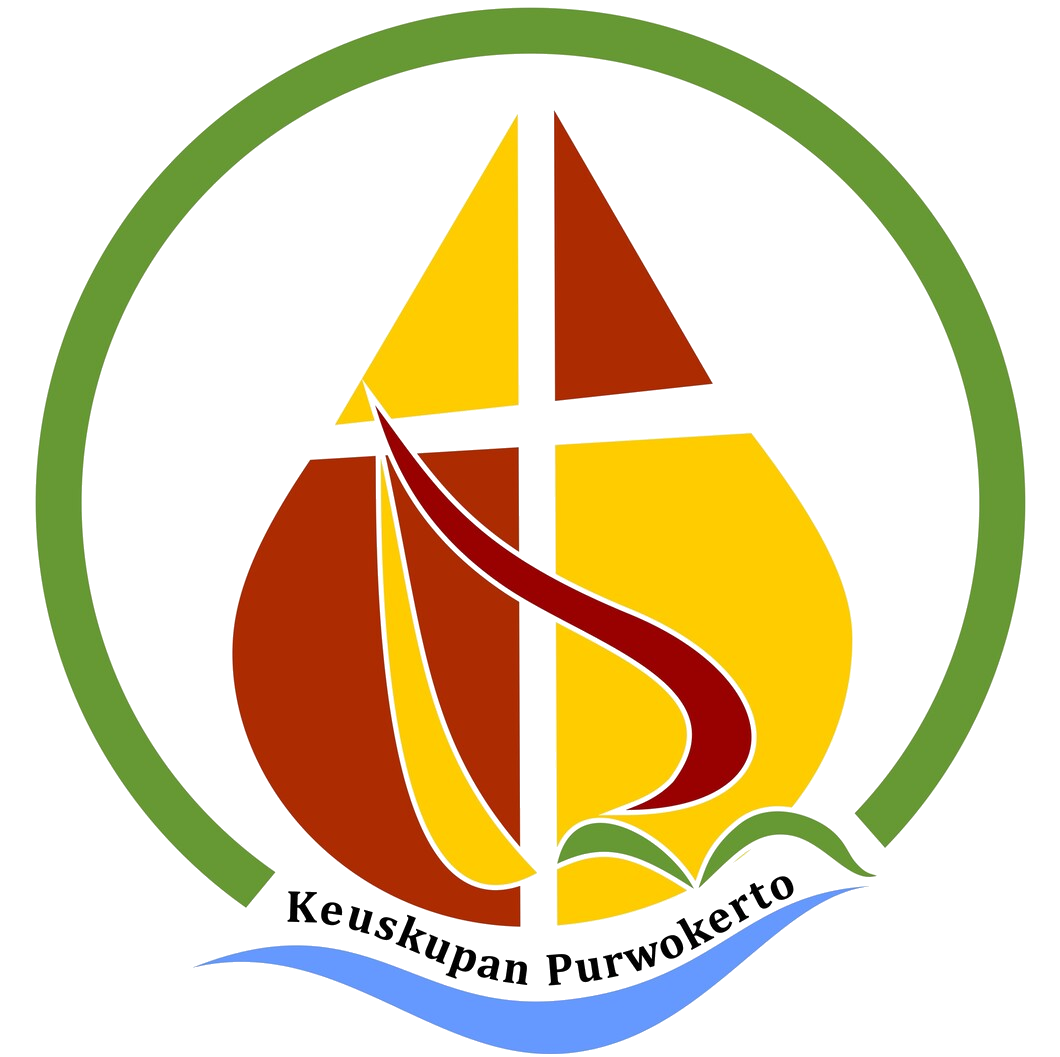
- Coat of arms

Location
- Country: Indonesia
- Ecclesiastical province: Semarang
- Metropolitan: Semarang

Statistics
- Area: 15,336 km^{2} (5,921 sq mi)
- Population: Total; Catholics: (as of 2010); 18,430,000; 73,728 (0.4%)

Information
- Rite: Latin Rite
- Cathedral: Christ the King Cathedral in Purwokerto

Current leadership
- Pope: Leo XIV
- Bishop: Christophorus Tri Harsono
- Metropolitan Archbishop: Robertus Rubiyatmoko

Website
- Website of the Diocese

The Roman Catholic Diocese of Purwokerto (Latin: Purvokerten(sis)) is a diocese located in the city of Purwokerto in the ecclesiastical province of Semarang in Indonesia. It administers parishes on the western side of Central Java province up to Batang, Wonosobo and Purworejo regencies at its eastern borders.

== History ==
- April 25, 1932: Established as Apostolic Prefecture of Purwokerto, on territory split off from the then Apostolic Vicariate of Batavia
- October 16, 1941: Promoted as Apostolic Vicariate of Purwokerto
- January 3, 1961: Promoted as Diocese of Purwokerto

== Leadership, in reverse chronological order ==
- Bishops of Purwokerto (Roman rite), below
  - Bishop Christophorus Tri Harsono (July 14, 2018 – present)
  - Bishop Julianus Kemo Sunarko, S.J. (May 10, 2000 – December 29, 2016)
  - Bishop Paschalis Soedita Hardjasoemarta, M.S.C. (December 17, 1973 – May 23, 1999)
  - Bishop Guillaume Schoemaker, M.S.C. (see below January 3, 1961 – December 17, 1973)
- Vicar Apostolic of Purwokerto (Roman Rite), below
  - Bishop Guillaume Schoemaker, M.S.C. (May 31, 1950 – January 3, 1961 see above)
- Prefect Apostolic of Purwokerto (Roman Rite), below
  - Fr. Bernardo Visser, M.S.C. (May 18, 1932 – 1941)
