= Archdiocese of Semarang =

Roman Catholic archdiocese in Central Java, Indonesia

Coordinates: 6.9667°S 110.4170°E

Archdiocese of Semarang Archidioecesis Semarangensis Keuskupan Agung Semarang
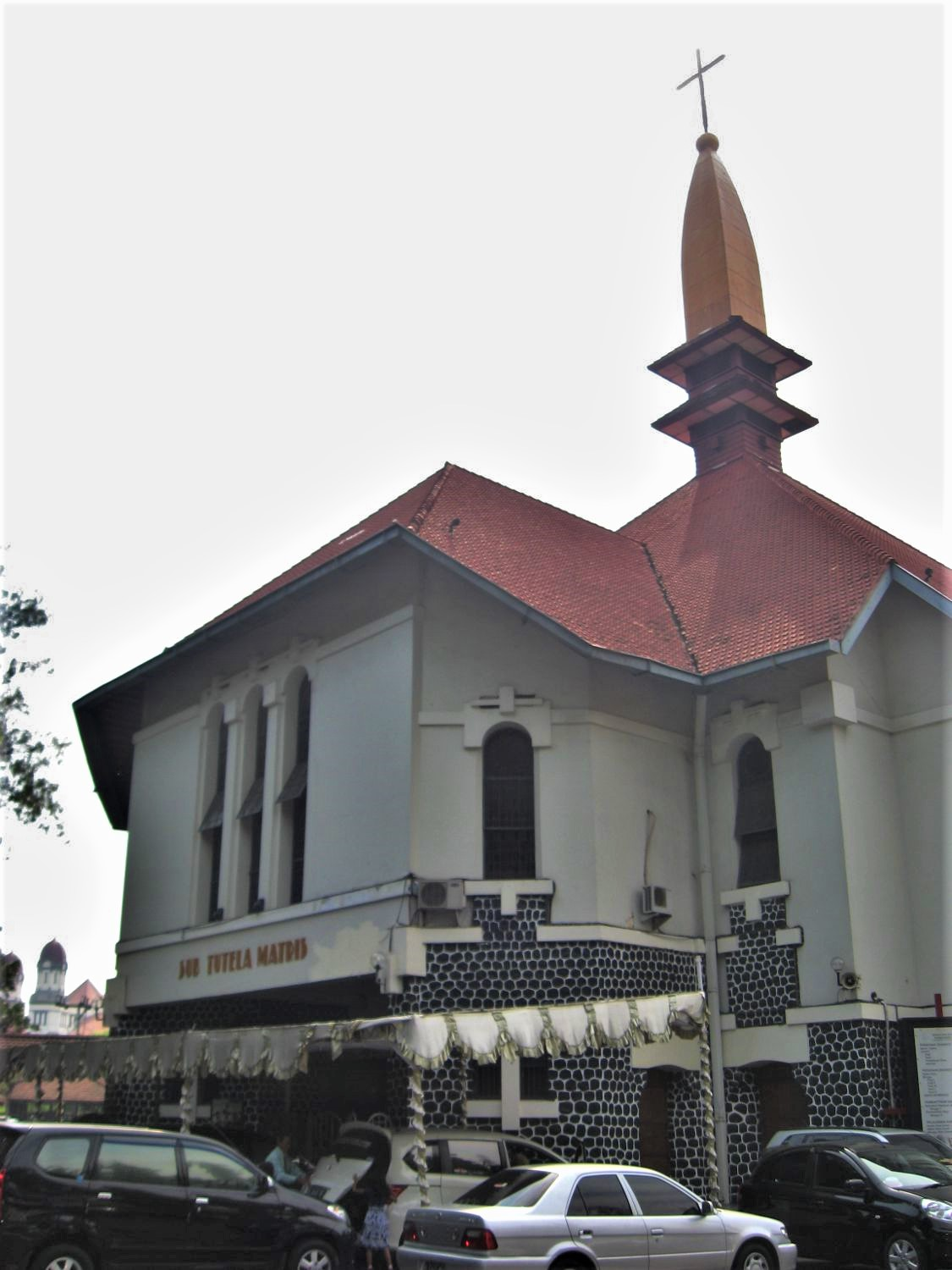
- The cathedral at Randusari

- Coat of arms

Location
- Country: Indonesia
- Ecclesiastical province: Semarang

Statistics
- Area: 21,196 km^{2} (8,184 sq mi)
- Population: Total; Catholics: (as of 2010); 20,391,000; 410,062 (2%)

Information
- Rite: Latin Rite
- Cathedral: Cathedral of the Holy Rosary

Current leadership
- Pope: Leo XIV
- Metropolitan Archbishop: Robertus Rubiyatmoko
- Vicar General: RD. Franciscus Xaverius Sugiyana

Website
- Website of the Archdiocese

The Roman Catholic Archdiocese of Semarang (Latin: Semarangen(sis)) is a Metropolitan Latin archdiocese on Java in Indonesia, yet it depends on the missionary Roman Congregation for the Evangelization of Peoples.

Its cathedral archiepiscopal see is Katedral Santa Perawan Maria Ratu Rosario Suci, dedicated to Our Lady of the Rosary, in the city of Semarang, Jawa Tengah.

== Statistics and extent ==
As per 2012, it pastorally administered 499,200 Catholics (2.4% of 20,812,000 total) on 21,196 km² in 98 parishes and 10 missions with 383 priests (174 diocesan, 209 religious), 1,914 lay religious (737 brothers, 1,177 sisters) and 60 seminarians.

It comprises parishes on the central and eastern part of Central Java - stretching from Kendal, Temanggung, Magelang to the east- as well as the Special Region of Yogyakarta province.

== History ==
- Established on June 25, 1940 as the Apostolic Vicariate of Semarang, on territory split off from the then Apostolic Vicariate of Batavia
- January 3, 1961: Promoted as Metropolitan Archdiocese of Semarang
- It enjoyed a Papal visit from Pope John Paul II October 1989.

The first Roman Catholic mission in this Archdiocese was established in 1640 when two Dominican priests, Manuel de St Maria, O.P. and Pedro de St Joseph, O.P., acquired land from Sultan of Mataram to minister Portuguese Catholic merchants in Jepara. The earliest mission dispersed as persecution of Catholics by Netherlands' colonial government. In 1807, Lambertus Prinsen set up and administered a parish at Semarang as Semarang was still part of Apostolic Prefecture of Batavia. In 1818, Prinsen appointed to become Apostolic Prefect of Batavia. The Semarang parish then administered by two parish priest successors. At 1859, Ambarawa became a new outstation by the coming of Jesuit priests. In 1865, a new outstation in Yogyakarta was created, followed by Magelang outstation. At 1904, Fransiskus Georgius Josephus van Lith, S.J., established a school for teachers in Muntilan and the spread of new teachers made Roman Catholic Church developed across Central Java and even for the whole Java Island. A minor seminary was founded in Muntilan in 1911 then moved to Mertoyudan.

In 1936, a major seminary was established in Yogyakarta.

== Ecclesiastical province ==
Its suffragan sees are :

- Roman Catholic Diocese of Malang
- Roman Catholic Diocese of Purwokerto
- Roman Catholic Diocese of Surabaya

== Ordinaries ==
=== Apostolic Vicar of Semarang ===
- Albertus Soegijapranata, S.J. (1940-1961)

=== Archbishops of Semarang ===
- Albertus Soegijapranata, S.J. (1961-1963)
- Cardinal Justinus Darmojuwono (1963-1981)
- Cardinal Julius Darmaatmadja, S.J. (1983-1997), appointed Archbishop of Jakarta
- Cardinal Ignatius Suharyo (1997-2009), appointed Archbishop of Jakarta
- Johannes Pujasumarta (2010-2015)
- Robertus Rubiyatmoko (2017–present)

== See also ==
- List of Catholic dioceses in Indonesia

== Sources and external links ==
- GCatholic.org - data for all sections
- Catholic Hierarchy
- Archdiocesan website
