= Roman Catholic Diocese of Manado =

Roman Catholic diocese on Sulawesi, Indonesia

Diocese of Manado Dioecesis Manadoënsis Keuskupan Manado
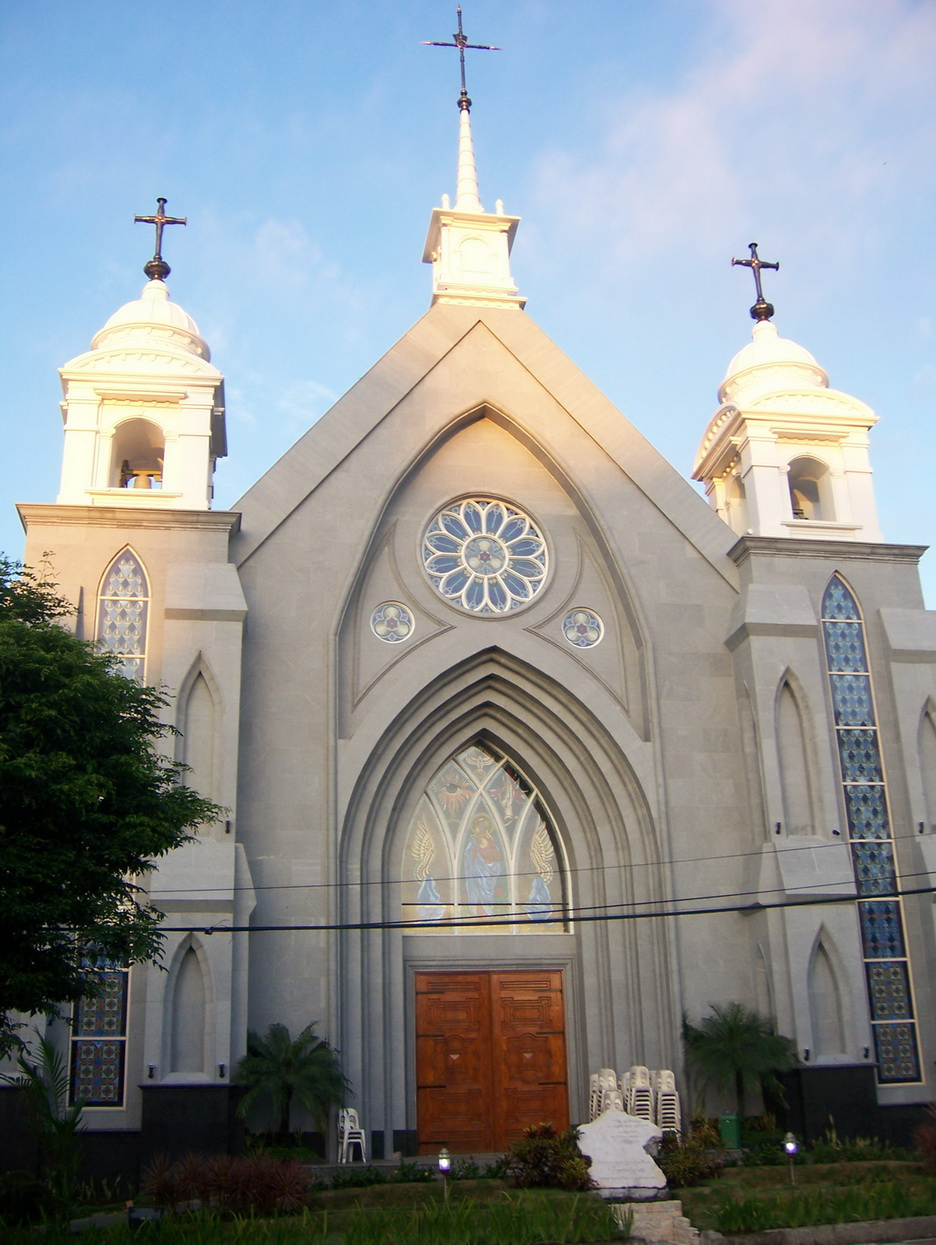
- Manado Cathedral

- Coat of Arms of Mgr. Rolly Untu M.S.C

Location
- Country: Indonesia
- Ecclesiastical province: Makassar
- Metropolitan: Makassar
- Subdivisions: Manado; Nusa Utara; Tonsea; Tomohon; Tombulu; Tondano; Stella Maris; Palu; Luwuk Banggai
- Headquarters: Jl. Sam Ratulangi No. 66, Kel. Wenang Selatan, Kec. Wenang, Kota Manado 95111
- Coordinates: 1.483320°N 124.836927°E

Statistics
- Area: 90,000 km^{2} (35,000 sq mi)
- Population: Total; Catholics: (as of 2022); 6,981,925; 148,035 (2,12%)

Information
- Rite: Latin Rite
- Cathedral: Cathedral of the Most Sacred Heart of Mary in Manado
- Language: Bahasa Indonesia; Tombulu language : for Vicariate of Manado (Manado), Vicariate of Tombulu (Minahasa Regency-Pineleng, Tombulu) and Vicariate of Tomohon (Tomohon); Tontemboan language : for Vicariate of Stella Maris (South Minahasa Regency) and Vicariate of Tondano (Minahasa Regency-Sonder, Kawangkoan, Langowan); Tonsea language : for Vicariate of Tonsea (North Minahasa Regency and Bitung)

Current leadership
- Pope: Leo XIV
- Bishop: Benedictus Estephanus Rolly Untu, M.S.C.
- Metropolitan Archbishop: Franciscus Nipa
- Bishops emeritus: Joseph Theodorus Suwatan, M.S.C.

Map
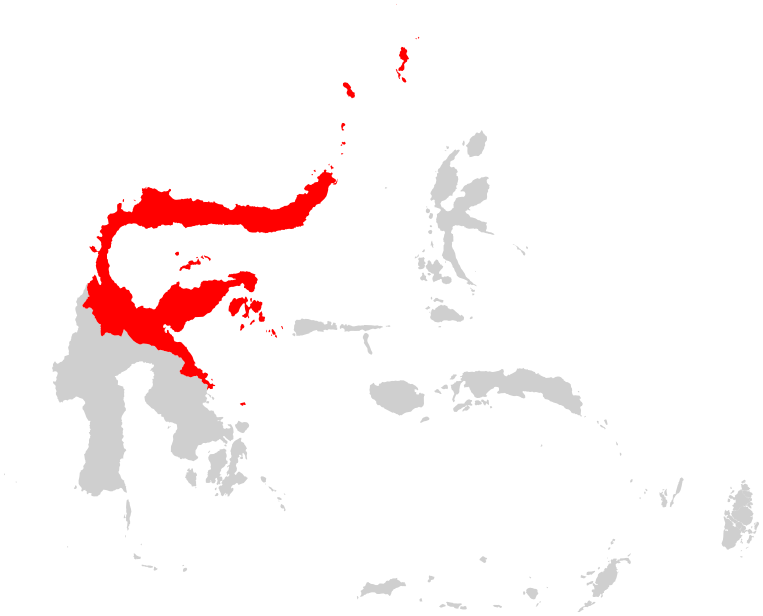
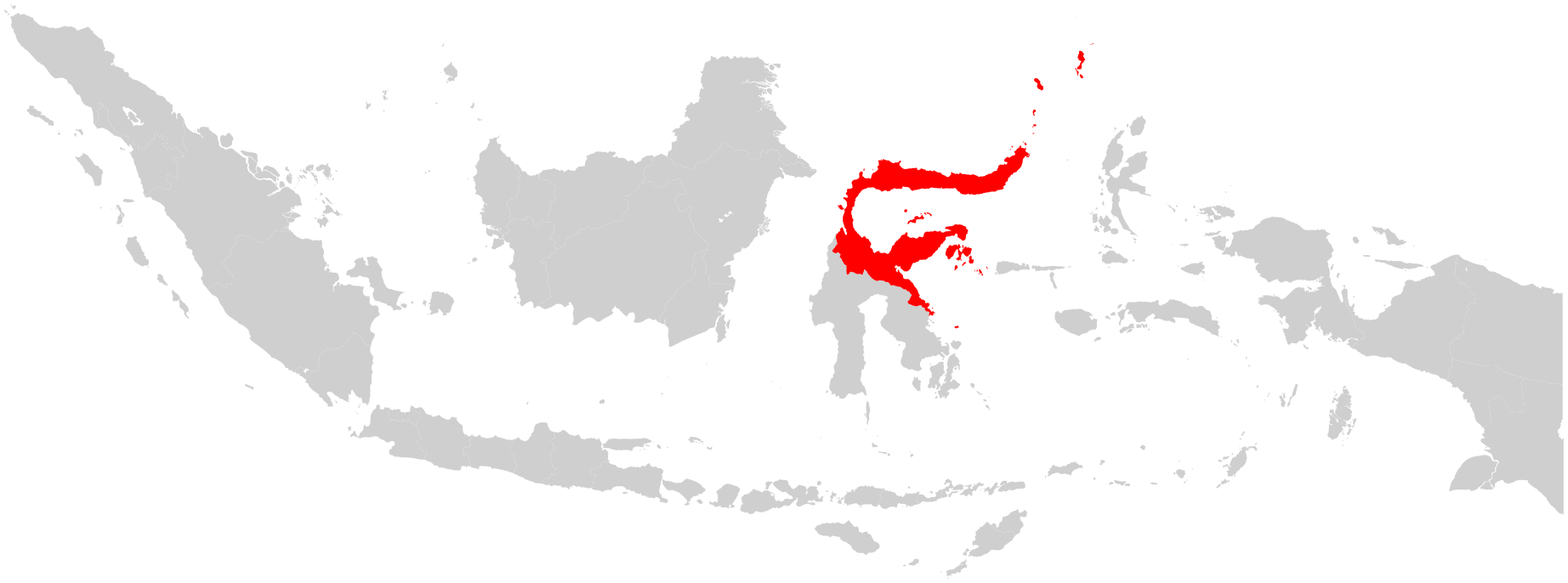

Website
- Website of the Diocese

The Roman Catholic Diocese of Manado (Indonesian: Keuskupan Manado) (Latin: Manadoën(sis)) is a Latin Rite suffragan diocese in the ecclesiastical province of the Metropolitan Archdiocese of Makassar on Sulawesi island (formerly Celebes) in Indonesia, yet depends on the missionary Roman Congregation for the Evangelization of Peoples.

The cathedral episcopal see, the Cathedral Church of the Immaculate Heart of Mary (Gereja Hati Tersuci Maria), located in the city of Manado, Sulawesi Utara, with its European architectural styles, unique bell towers, and topped with a beautiful central cupola, is located on the iconic Sam Ratulangi Street.

== Statistics and extent ==
As per 2022, it pastorally served 148,035 Catholics (2.12% of 6,981,925 total) on 90,000 km² in 76 parishes (2 quasi-parish) and 240 missions with 134 priests (90 diocesan, 34 religious), 366 lay religious (146 brothers, 220 sisters) and 98 seminarians.

Its service area covers the entire administrative provinces of North Sulawesi, Gorontalo and Central Sulawesi.

== History ==
Below is a summary of the history leading up to the formation of this diocese.

- Established on 19 November 1919 as the Apostolic Prefecture of Celebes, on territory split off from the Apostolic Vicariate of Batavia
- 1 February 1934: Promoted as the Apostolic Vicariate of Celebes
- 13 April 1937: Renamed as Apostolic Vicariate of Manado, having lost territory to establish the then Apostolic Prefecture of Makassar (its future Metropolitan)
- Promoted on 3 January 1961 as Diocese of Manado, as suffragan of the Metropolitan Archdiocese of Makassar

== Ordinaries ==
(all Roman rite, so far members of a missionary Latin congregation)

Apostolic Prefects of Celebes

- Father Gerardo Vesters, Sacred Heart Missionaries (M.S.C.) (born Netherlands) (12 December 1919 – 16 February 1923), later Titular Bishop of Diocletianopolis in Palæstina (16 February 1923 – death 30 August 1954) as Apostolic Vicar of Rabaul (Papua New Guinea) (16 February 1923 – retired 1938)
- Joannes Walter Panis, M.S.C. (born Netherlands) (12 June 1923 – 1 February 1934 see below)

Apostolic Vicar of Celebes

- Joannes Walter Panis, M.S.C. (see above 1 February 1934 – 13 April 1937 see below), Titular Bishop of Trisipa (1 February 1934 – death 23 June 1952)

Apostolic Vicars of Manado

- Joannes Walter Panis, M.S.C. (see above 13 April 1937 – retired 1946)
- Nicolas Verhoeven, M.S.C. (born Netherlands) (13 March 1947 – 3 January 1961 see below), Titular Bishop of Hermonthis (13 March 1947 – 3 January 1961)

Suffragan Bishops of Manado

- Nicolas Verhoeven, M.S.C. (see above 3 January 1961 – retired 26 June 1969), emeriate as Titular Bishop of Strongoli (26 June 1969 – resigned 15 September 1976), died 1981
- Theodorus Hubertus Moors, M.S.C. (born Netherlands) (26 June 1969 – retired 8 February 1990), died 2003; succeeded as former Titular Bishop of Choba (13 April 1967 – 26 June 1969) and Auxiliary Bishop of Manado (13 April 1967 – 26 June 1969)
- Joseph Theodorus Suwatan, M.S.C. (first native incumbent) (8 February 1990 – retired 12 April 2017), also President of Episcopal Conference of Indonesia (1997 – 2000)
- Bishop Benedictus Estephanus Rolly Untu, M.S.C. (8 July 2017 – ...), no previous prelature

== See also ==
- List of Catholic dioceses in Indonesia

== Sources and external links ==
- GCatholic.org - data for all sections
- Catholic Hierarchy
