= Pertransiit benefaciendo =

Pertransiit benefaciendo is a Latin phrase which means "He went about doing good". The first word may synonymously be spelled pertransivit. When spelled pertransit it means "He goes about" (present tense).

It is applied about one who has died, to show that they have done good in their life. It originates from the words of St. Peter to Cornelius the centurion when speaking of Jesus Christ. The quotation is from the Holy Bible, Acts 10:38.

34 Then Peter opened his mouth and said ...

38 How God anointed Jesus of Nazareth with the Holy Ghost and with power:
who went about doing good, and healing all that were oppressed of the devil;
for God was with him.

Latin
38 Iesum a Nazareth quomodo unxit eum Deus Spiritu Sancto et virtute
qui pertransivit benefaciendo et sanando omnes oppressos a diabolo
quoniam Deus erat cum illo.

The phrase is also found as Pertransivit benefaciendo, Per transiit benefaciendo, etc.

== Examples ==
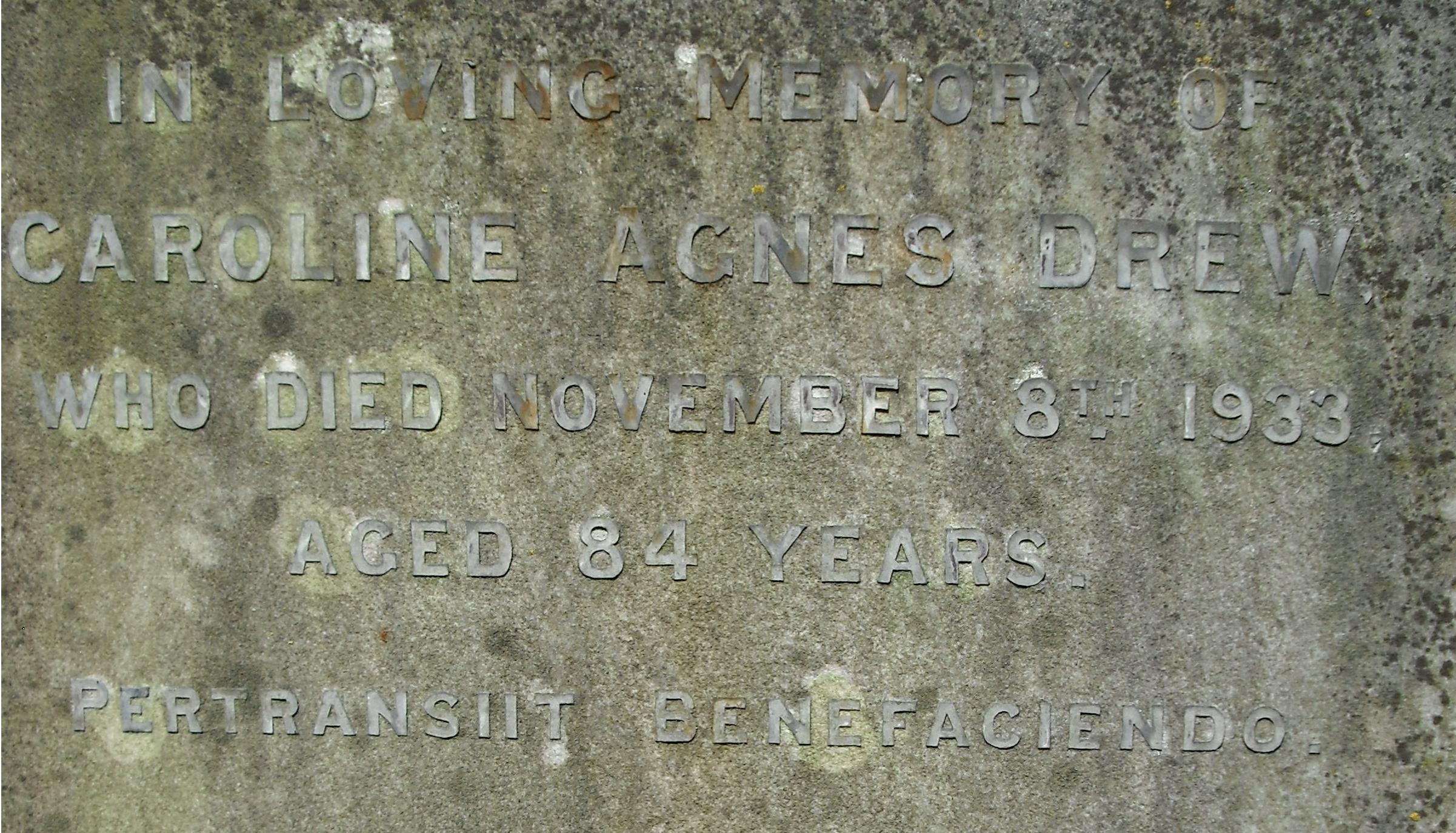
PERTRANSIIT BENEFACIENDO on a memorial

- St. Margaret of Scotland "Like the Divine Master on Whom she modelled her life it could be said of her pertransit benefaciendo — she walks through our Scottish story doing good."
- The motto of Bishop Getúlio Teixeira Guimarães, S.V.D., Prelate of the Roman Catholic Diocese of Cornélio Procópio, in GCatholic.org
- Obituary of Pierre Potain, M.D., Professor of Medicine in the University of Paris, in British Medical Journal 12 Jan 1901
- Memorial plaque to Caroline Agnes Drew, daughter of Joseph Drew, on the Drew family memorial at Melcombe Regis Cemetery - see image
- Motto of Peter Turang, Archbishop Emeritus of Kupang
