= Theodorus Lumanauw =

Archbishop of Ujung Pandang

- Archbishop of Ujung Pandang
- Church: Catholic Church
- Archdiocese: Archdiocese of Ujung Pandang
- In office: 7 August 1973 – 18 May 1981
- Predecessor: Nicolaas Schneiders
- Successor: Franciscus van Roessel

Orders
- Ordination: 7 July 1946
- Consecration: 22 September 1973 by Adrianus Djajasepoetra

Personal details
- Born: 8 May 1922 Tondano, Manado Residency, Dutch East Indies, Dutch Empire
- Died: 18 May 1983 (aged 61)

Mgr. Theodorus Lumanauw (8 May 1922 – 18 May 1981) was archbishop of Ujung Pandang from 7 August 1973 until his death in office on 18 May 1981.

== Ministry ==
Lumanauw was ordained a priest on July 7, 1946. He was appointed Archbishop of Makassar on 7 August 1973, following the archepiscopate of Mgr. Nicolas Martinus Schneiders, C.I.C.M. Over the month and a half between his appointment as Archbishop of Makassar until the day of his episcopal consecration, there has been a significant change in the local Church in Indonesia, with the name of the see being changed from Makassar to Ujung Pandang on August 22, 1973. He was consecrated a Bishop by Archbishop Adrianus Djajasepoetra, S.J., Archbishop Emeritus of Jakarta who is also the Titular Archbishop of Volsinium.

As the first indigenous Archbishop of Makassar, he paid attention to making the local Church self-reliant. The education of prospective priests became a major focus and at that time 12 priests were ordained. In addition, he built the Seminary 'Anging Mamiri' in Yogyakarta which opened in 1978. In terms of funding, some unpopular measures were taken, such as closing or handing over to the government Catholic schools and Atma Jaya Catholic University Makassar.

He continued the pattern of annual meetings of priests that had begun under his predecessor, Mgr. Schneiders, to develop a system of pastoral care. On June 17, 1979, he became the Companion Consulter Bishop for Mgr. Blasius Pujaraharja as Bishop of Ketapang along with the Archbishop of Pontianak, Mgr. Hieronymus Herculanus Bumbun, O.F.M. Cap. Cardinal Justinus Darmojuwono, Archbishop of Semarang became the presiding Bishop.

He served until his death on May 18, 1981 and was succeeded by Mgr. Franciscus van Roessel, C.I.C.M.
