= Diocese of Bandung =

Roman Catholic diocese on Java, Indonesia

Coordinates: 6.9167°S 107.6000°E

Diocese of Bandung Dioecesis Bandungensis Keuskupan Bandung
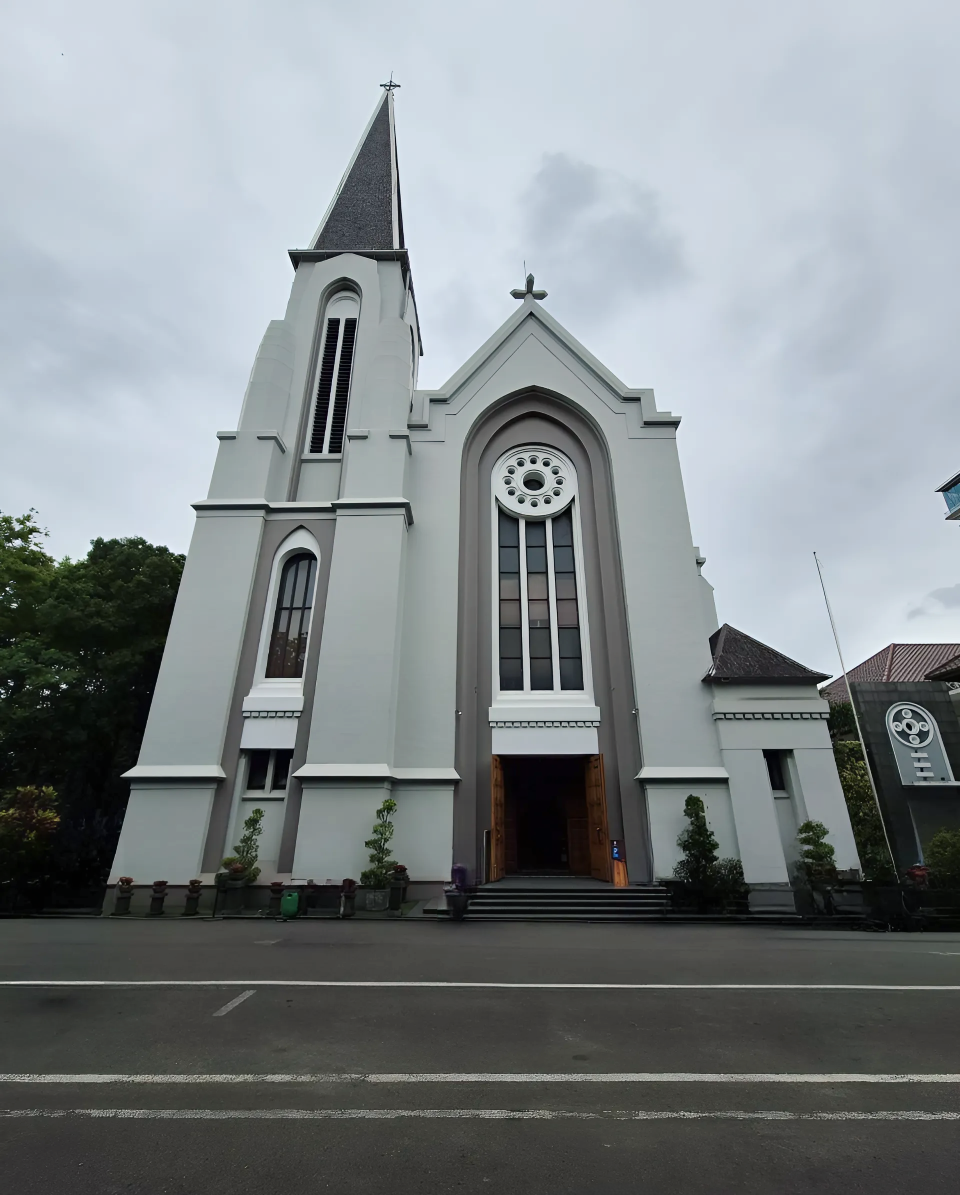
- Cathedral of St Peter in Bandung

Location
- Country: Indonesia
- Ecclesiastical province: Jakarta
- Metropolitan: Jakarta

Statistics
- Area: 24,449 km^{2} (9,440 sq mi)
- Population: Total; Catholics: (as of 2012); 27,018,000; 87,247 (0.3%)
- Parishes: 23

Information
- Denomination: Catholic
- Rite: Latin Rite
- Cathedral: St. Peter's Cathedral, Bandung

Current leadership
- Pope: Leo XIV
- Bishop: Antonius Subianto Bunyamin, O.S.C.
- Metropolitan Archbishop: Ignatius Suharyo Hardjoatmodjo

Website
- Website of the Diocese

The Roman Catholic Diocese of Bandung (Latin: Bandungen(sis)) is a diocese located in the city of Bandung in the ecclesiastical province of the Metropolitan of Jakarta on Java, in Indonesia.

Its cathedral episcopal see is Katedral Santo Petrus (St. Peter's cathedral), in Bandung, Jawa Barat, on Jawa (Java).

== History ==
- 20 April 1932: Established as the Apostolic Prefecture of Bandung, on territory split off from the Apostolic Vicariate of Batavia (on Java, then Dutch East Indies)
- 16 October 1941: Promoted as Apostolic Vicariate of Bandung
- 3 January 1961: Promoted as Diocese of Bandung

== Ordinaries ==
(all Roman rite)

Apostolic Prefect of Bandung

- Fr. Giacomo Umberto Goumans, Crosier Canons O.S.Cr. (27 May 1932 – 16 October 1941 see below)

Apostolic Vicars of Bandung

- Giacomo Umberto Goumans, O.S.Cr. (see above October 16, 1941 – 1951), Titular Bishop of Lauzadus (16 October 1941 – 6 June 1953)
- Pierre Marin Arntz, O.S.Cr. (10 January 1952 – 3 January 1961 see below), Titular Bishop of Stectorium (10 January 1952 – 3 January 1961)

Suffragan Bishops of Bandung

- Pierre Marin Arntz, O.S.Cr. (see above 3 January 1961 – 25 April 1984)
- Alexander Soetandio Djajasiswaja (2 July 1984 – 19 January 2006)
- Johannes Pujasumarta (Johannes Maria Trilaksyanta Pujasumarta) (17 May 2008 – 12 November 2010), later Metropolitan Archbishop of Semarang (Indonesia) (12 November 2010 – 10 November 2015)
- Apostolic administrator Ignatius Suharyo Hardjoatmodjo (12 November 2010 – 3 June 2014), while Metropolitan Archbishop of Jakarta (Indonesia) (28 June 2010 – ...)
- Antonius Subianto Bunyamin, O.S.Cr. (3 June 2014 – )

== Parishes ==
The Roman Catholic Diocese of Bandung has 14 parochial churches. Nine of them are located inside the city. The other five are located outside Bandung.

In Bandung city

- St. Peter's Cathedral
- Church of St. Mary the Virgin of the Seven Sorrows (commonly referred to as "Pandu" Parochial Church, being located at Pandu street)
- Church of the Immaculate Heart of the Blessed Virgin Mary (commonly referred to "Buah Batu" Parochial Church, located at Buah Batu Street.
- Church of the Holy Cross (commonly referred to as "Kamuning" Parochial Church, being located at Kamuning Street)
- St. Michael's(commonly referred to as "Waringin" Parochial Church, being located at Waringin street)
- St. Lawrence's(commonly referred to as "Sukajadi" Parochial Church, being located at Sukajadi street)
- St. Gabriel's (also called "Gandarusa", Indonesian word for willow tree, taken from Isiah 44:4, used to be a chapel in St. Michael's parish.
- St. Martin's
- St. Paul's
- St. Melany's
- St. Odilia's

Outside of Bandung City

- St. Michael's (commonly referred to as "Indramayu" Parochial Church, being located at Karawang town)
- Holy Cross Church (commonly referred to as "Purwakarta" Parochial Church, being located at Purwakarta town)
- Church of the Sacred Heart of Jesus (commonly referred to as "Tasikmalaya" Parochial Church, being located at Tasikmalaya town)
- Church of Our Lady of Fatima (commonly referred to as "Lembang" Parochial Church, being located at Lembang town)
- Church of St. Francis Xavier (Dayeuhkolot Quasi-parish Church)

== Sources and external links ==
- GCatholic.org, with incumbent biography links
- Catholic Hierarchy
- Bandung Diocese website
