= Rolly Untu =

20th and 21st-century Indonesian Catholic bishop

The Most Reverend Benedictus Estephanus Rolly Untu M.S.C.
- Bishop, Diocese of Manado
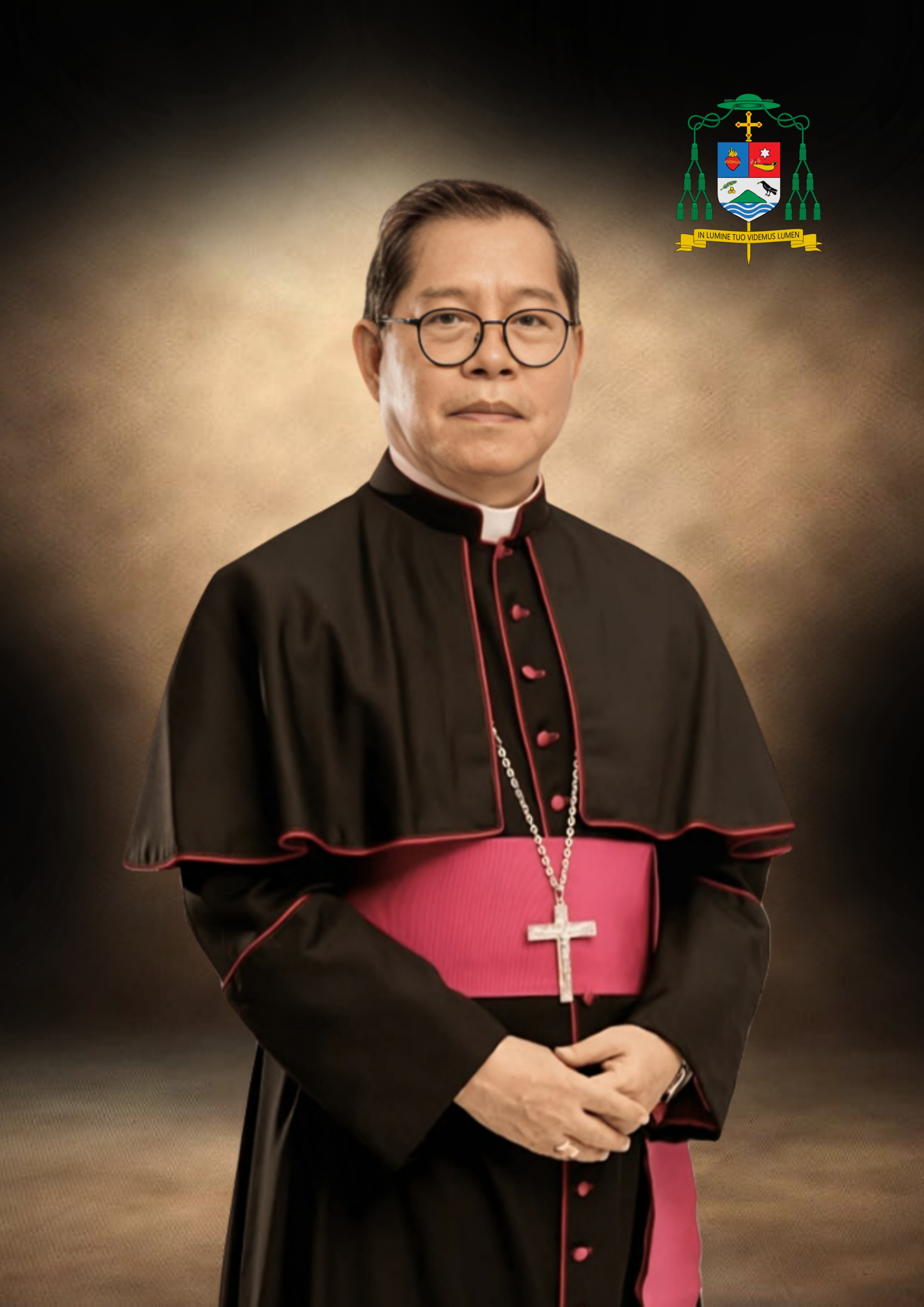
- Rolly Untu in 2025
- Church: Roman Catholic Church
- Diocese: Diocese of Manado
- In office: 2017–
- Predecessor: Joseph Theodorus Suwatan

Orders
- Ordination: 29 June 1983 by Theodorus Hubertus Moors
- Consecration: 12 April 2017 by Antonio Guido Filipazzi
- Rank: Bishop

Personal details
- Born: 4 January 1951 (age 75) Lembean, Minahasa Regency, North Sulawesi, Indonesia
- Coat of arms

Styles of Benedictus Estephanus Rolly Untu
- Reference style: The Most Reverend
- Spoken style: Your Excellency
- Religious style: Bishop

Mgr. Benedictus Estephanus Rolly Untu M.S.C. (born 4 January 1951) is the Indonesian Roman Catholic bishop of the Diocese of Manado being appointed in 2017.

Rolly Untu was born in the village of Lembean in what is now Minahasa Regency. He attended minor seminary in Kakaskasen and then completed his philosophical and theological studies in the seminary of Pineleng. He gave his perpetual vows on 15 January 1983 in Manado, and was ordained a priest on 29 June 1983 in Manado, in the order of the Missionaries of the Sacred Heart. He later studied dogmatic theology in Bangalore, India, and Catholic University of Lovanio in Belgium. Rolly Untu was ordained bishop of Manado on 8 June 2017.

As bishop of Manado, Rolly Untu has seen expansion of the diocese and construction of new Churches. In February 2018 Rolly Untu celebrated the 150th anniversary of the founding of the diocese of Manado. Rolly Untu has also participated in interfaith dialogue with other religious groups to improve the attitudes following the religious violence of the previous decade.
