= Julius Darmaatmadja =

Indonesian cardinal

His Eminence Julius Darmaatmadja SJ
- Cardinal, Archbishop Emeritus of Jakarta
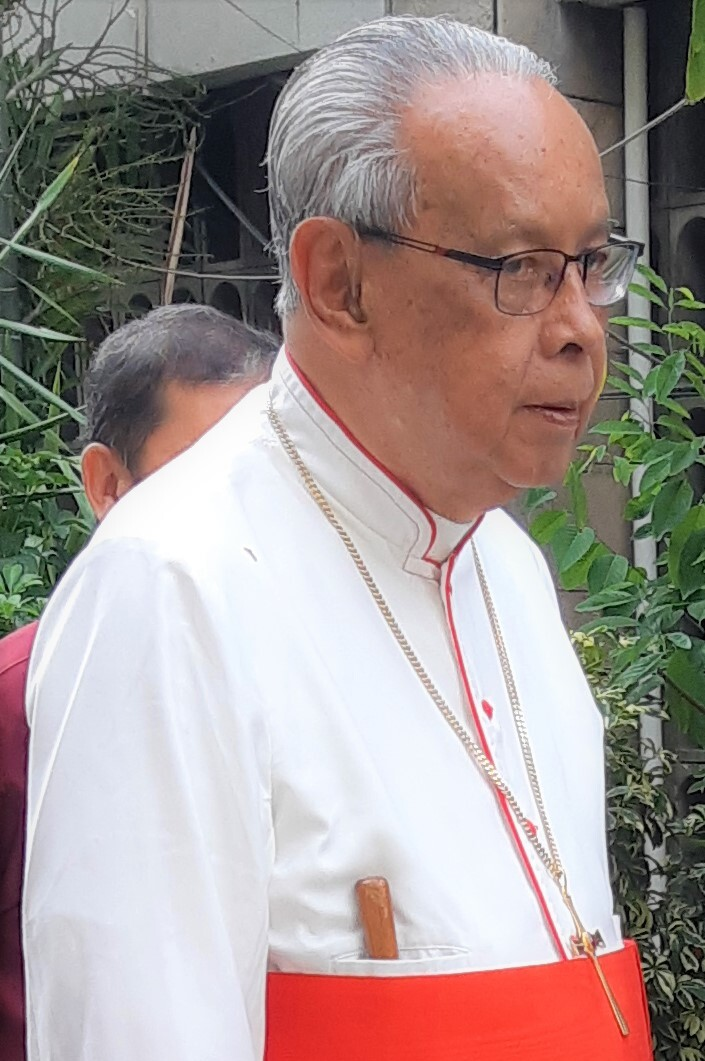
- Darmaatmadja in 2018
- Church: Catholic Church
- Archdiocese: Jakarta
- Appointed: 30 December 1995
- Installed: 11 January 1996
- Term ended: 28 June 2010
- Predecessor: Leo Soekoto
- Successor: Ignatius Suharyo
- Other post: Cardinal Priest of Sacro Cuore di Maria (1993–)
- Previous posts: Archbishop of Semarang (1983‍–‍1996); Military Ordinary of Indonesia (1984‍–‍2006); President of the Bishops' Conference of Indonesia (1988‍–‍1997); President of the Bishops' Conference of Indonesia (2000‍–‍2006)

Orders
- Ordination: 18 December 1969 by Justinus Darmojuwono
- Consecration: 29 June 1983 by Justinus Darmojuwono
- Created cardinal: 26 November 1994 by Pope John Paul II
- Rank: Cardinal priest

Personal details
- Born: Julius Riyadi Darmaatmadja; 20 December 1934 (age 91) Magelang, Dutch East Indies
- Education: De Nobili College; Saint Ignatius College
- Motto: In nomine Jesu (Latin for 'In the name of Jesus')
- Coat of arms: Julius Darmaatmadja's coat of arms

Ordination history
History
Priestly ordination
- Ordained by: Justinus Darmojuwono
- Date: 18 December 1969
Episcopal consecration
- Principal consecrator: Justinus Darmojuwono
- Co-consecrators: Francis Xavier Sudartanta Hadisumarta; Leo Soekoto
- Date: 29 June 1983
Cardinalate
- Elevated by: Pope John Paul II
- Date: 26 November 1994
Episcopal succession
Bishops consecrated by Julius Darmaatmadja as principal consecrator
- Peter Turang: 27 July 1997
- Ignatius Suharyo Hardjoatmodjo: 22 August 1997
- Agustinus Agus: 6 February 2000
- Julianus Kemo Sunarko: 8 September 2000
- Aloysius Maryadi Sutrisnaatmaka: 7 May 2001
- Yustinus Harjosusanto: 14 April 2002
- Vincentius Sensi Potokota: 23 April 2006
- Vincentius Sutikno Wisaksono: 29 June 2007
- Johannes Pujasumarta: 16 July 2008

Julius Riyadi Darmaatmadja, SJ (born 20 December 1934) is an Indonesian cardinal of the Roman Catholic Church. He was made a cardinal in 1994, becoming the second Indonesian to be a cardinal. He served as the archbishop of Semarang from 1983 to 1996 and archbishop of Jakarta from 1996 to 2010.

== Biography ==
Darmaatmadja entered Saint Peter Canisius Minor seminary in Magelang, Central Java in 1951 and Society of Jesus in 1957. He studied philosophy from 1961 to 1964 at De Nobili College, Pontifical Athenaeum, Pune, Maharashtra and theology from 1966 to 1970 at Saint Ignatius College, Yogyakarta. He was ordained priest on 18 December 1969 by Cardinal Justinus Darmojuwono. He was then assigned as parish priest in the Archdiocese of Semarang from 1971 to 1973, in Indonesian Province of the Society of Jesus from 1973 to 1978, and then as Rector of Saint Peter Canisius minor seminary from 1978 to 1981. He served as Provincial of the Indonesian Province of the Society of Jesus from 1981 to 1983.

On 19 February 1983 Pope John Paul II appointed him Archbishop of Semarang; he received episcopal consecration from Justinus Darmojuwono on 29 June 1983. On 28 April 1984, he was also appointed Ordinary of the Indonesian Military Forces (ABRI) Ordinariate.

He was created Cardinal-Priest of titular see of S Cuore di Maria by Pope John Paul II on 26 November 1994 consistory, and became the second Indonesian cardinal after Cardinal Darmojuwono, who died earlier that year. Upon the retirement of Leo Soekoto he was appointed Archbishop of Jakarta and installed on 11 January 1996. He was elected President of National Bishops' Conference of Indonesia from 1988 to 1997 and again from 2001 to 2006.

He submitted his resignation upon reaching mandatory retirement age of 75 and Pope Benedict XVI accepted his retirement on 28 June 2010. He was automatically succeeded as Archbishop of Jakarta by the Coadjutor Archbishop Ignatius Suharyo Hardjoatmodjo.

He participated as an elector in the 2005 papal conclave, which elected Pope Benedict XVI. Although eligible to participate as an elector, for health reasons Darmaatmadja did not attend the 2013 papal conclave that followed Benedict's resignation. He ceased to be qualify as a cardinal elector following his 80th birthday 20 December 2014.

== Views ==
He has rejected the identification of Islam with terrorism, called upon Christians to forgive Islamic radicals behind church bombings in 2000, and was an outspoken critic of the US-led war in Iraq.

Catholic Church titles
Preceded by Leo Soekoto	Archbishop of Jakarta; 1995–2010	Succeeded by Ignatius Suharyo
New diocese Elevated from military vicariate	Military Ordinary of Indonesia; 1986–2006	Succeeded by Ignatius Suharyo
Preceded by Justinus Darmojuwono	Military Vicar of Indonesia; 1984–1986	Elevated to military ordinariate
Preceded by Justinus Darmojuwono	Archbishop of Semarang; 1983–1996	Succeeded by Ignatius Suharyo
Preceded by Joseph Theodorus Suwatan	Chair of the Bishops' Conference of Indonesia; 2000–2006	Succeeded by Martinus Dogma Situmorang
Preceded by Francis Xavier Hadisumarta	Chair of the Bishops' Conference of Indonesia; 1988–1997	Succeeded by Joseph Theodorus Suwatan
Preceded by Lawrence Picachy	Cardinal Priest of Sacro Cuore di Maria; 1993–present	Incumbent
