= Jacobus Nelissen =

First Apostolic Prefect of Indonesia

Jacobus Nelissen was a Catholic priest born in the Netherlands who became the first Apostolic Prefect of Batavia, leading the local Church from 1808 until 1817.

== Biography ==
Jacobus Nelissen was born in Mill in the Netherlands on 3 October 1752. In 1805, Nelissen left for the Dutch Cape Colony as a missionary, together with Joannes Lansink and Lambertus Prinsen. Their departure was aimed at establishing an apostolic prefecture at the Cape of Good Hope and providing pastoral care to the Dutch people there. They sailed on a Prussian ship and arrived in South Africa on 4 October 1805. After the occupation of the colony by the British Empire on 18 January 1806, all Dutch residents were expelled, including these three missionaries. Lansink then died on 8 March 1806.

On 8 May 1807 the leadership of the Catholic church in Rome received Napoleon's approval to establish the Apostolic Prefecture of the Dutch East Indies. Nelissen and Prinsen left for the Dutch East Indies on 22 July 1807, after receiving approval in the form of a decree from Lodewijk. Nelissen was appointed as Apostolic Prefect of Batavia by decision of Propaganda Fide on 8 May 1807. On 22 July 1807, Mgr. Nelissen departed from Texel to the Dutch East Indies as missionary along with Mgr. Lambertus Prinsen. The goal was to establish an Apostolic Prefecture in Batavia. Mgr. Nelissen arrived in Batavia and was installed as the first Prefect Apostolic of Batavia on 4 April 1808. He began working with pioneering the establishment of the first Catholic Church named St. Lucovicus in Senen.

The first public eucharist celebration in Batavia was held at the home of Doctor FCH Assmuss who served as Head of the Health Service on 10 April 1808. In 1809, Prinsen left for Semarang to use several Protestant churches as places of worship. This continued until 1824.

Nelissen died in Batavia, Hindia Belanda, on 6 December 1817, at the age of 65 years, after contracting tuberculosis. His body was buried at Tanah Abang Cemetery, now the Taman Prasasti Museum in Jakarta. He was succeeded as apostolic prefect by Lambertus Prinsen.
