= Archdiocese of Makassar =

Roman Catholic archdiocese on Sulawesi, Indonesia

Coordinates: 5.1333°S 119.4170°E

Metropolitan Archdiocese of Makassar Archidioecesis Metropolitae Makassarensis Keuskupan Agung Metropolitan Makassar
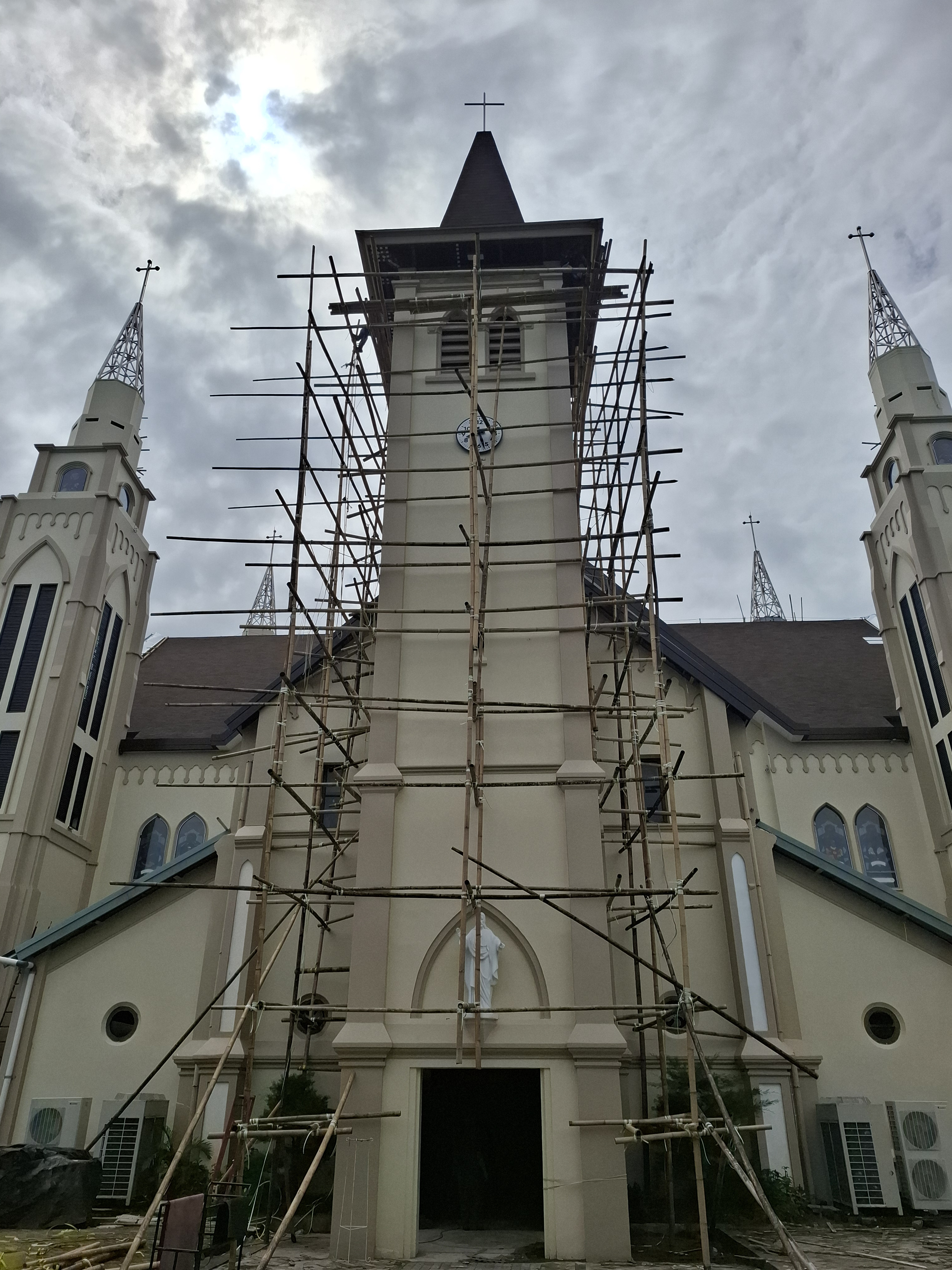
- Makassar Cathedral (under renovation)

Location
- Country: Indonesia
- Ecclesiastical province: Makassar

Statistics
- Area: 116,252 km^{2} (44,885 sq mi)
- Population: Total; Catholics: (as of 2004); 11,519,628; 178,592 (1.6%)
- Parishes: 43

Information
- Rite: Latin Rite
- Cathedral: Cathedral of the Sacred Heart of Jesus in Makassar

Current leadership
- Pope: Leo XIV
- Metropolitan Archbishop: Franciscus Nipa

Website
- kams.or.id

The Roman Catholic Metropolitan Archdiocese of Makassar (Latin: Archidioecesis Metropolitae Makassarensis) is an archdiocese located in the city of Makassar in South Sulawesi in Indonesia.

It covers parishes located in the administrative provinces of South Sulawesi, West Sulawesi and Southeast Sulawesi.

== History ==
- April 13, 1937: Established as Apostolic Prefecture of Makassar from the Apostolic Vicariate of Celebes
- May 13, 1948: Promoted as Apostolic Vicariate of Makassar
- January 3, 1961: Promoted as Metropolitan Archdiocese of Makassar
- August 22, 1973: Renamed as Metropolitan Archdiocese of Ujung Pandang
- March 15, 2000: Renamed as Metropolitan Archdiocese of Makassar

== Ecclesial provinces ==
- Manado
- Amboina

== Leadership ==
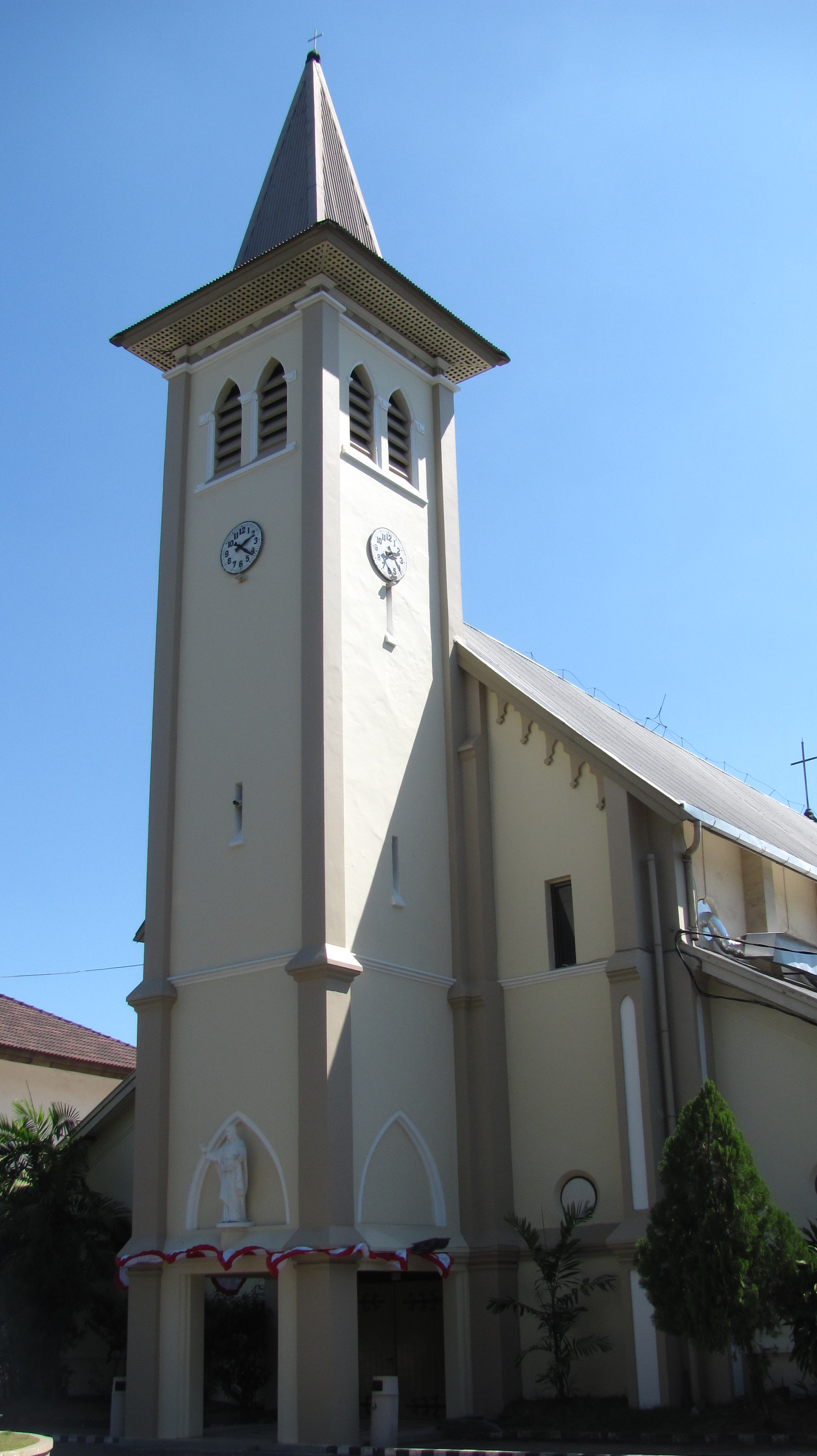
Cathedral of Makassar

- Metropolitan Archbishops of Makassar (Roman rite)
  - Archbishop Franciscus Nipa (17 October 2024 - Present)
  - Archbishop Johannes Liku Ada’ (11 November 1994 – 17 October 2024)
- Metropolitan Archbishops of Ujung Pandang (Roman Rite)
  - Archbishop Franciscus van Roessel, C.I.C.M. (18 January 1988 – 21 May 1994)
  - Archbishop Theodorus Lumanauw (7 August 1973 – 18 May 1981)
- Metropolitan Archbishops of Makassar (Roman Rite)
  - Archbishop Nicolas Martinus Schneiders, C.I.C.M. (3 January 1961 – 7 August 1973)
- Vicars Apostolic of Makassar (Roman Rite)
  - Bishop Nicolas Martinus Schneiders, C.I.C.M. (later Archbishop) (10 June 1948 – 3 January 1961)
- Prefects Apostolic of Makassar (Roman Rite)
  - Fr. Gerardo Martino Uberto Martens, C.I.C.M. (11 June 1937 – 1948)

== Suffragan dioceses ==
- Amboina
- Manado

== Sources ==
- GCatholic.org
- Catholic Hierarchy
