= Leo Soekoto =

Indonesian archbishop

The Most Reverend Leo Soekoto SJ
- Archbishop of Jakarta
- Church: Catholic Church
- Archdiocese: Jakarta
- Appointed: 21 May 1970
- Installed: 1 July 1970
- Term ended: 30 December 1995
- Predecessor: Adrianus Djajasepoetra
- Successor: Julius Darmaatmadja
- Other post: Apostolic Administrator of Bogor (1993‍–‍1994)
- Previous posts: Secretary of the Archdiocese of Jakarta (1966‍–‍1967); Vicar General of Jakarta (1967‍–‍1970)

Orders
- Ordination: 22 August 1953
- Consecration: 15 August 1970 by Justinus Darmojuwono

Personal details
- Born: 23 October 1920 Sleman, Dutch East Indies
- Died: 30 December 1995 (aged 75) Semarang, Indonesia
- Buried: Girisonta, Central Java
- Education: Pontifical Gregorian University
- Motto: Scio cui credidi (Latin for 'I know whom I believed')

Ordination history
History
Episcopal consecration
- Principal consecrator: Justinus Darmojuwono
- Co-consecrators: Adrianus Djajasepoetra; Paulus Sani Kleden

Leo Soekoto, SJ (23 October 1920 – 30 December 1995) was a Roman Catholic prelate who served as the archbishop of Jakarta from 1970 to his death. He was appointed priest on 22 August 1953 at the age of 32 years.

Soekoto died on Saturday, 30 December 1995 in RS St. Elisabeth, Semarang from cancer of the spinal cord, and was buried in the cemetery complex area Girisonta Retreat House, Central Java.

== Biography ==
Soekoto was the second of three sons of village headman Gayamharjo, Wongsosentono and Soeratinah.

After finishing school he entered the Seminary Medium on the Road Code (now Jalan Abubakar Ali) Yogyakarta for six years. After graduating he entered the Society of Jesus (SJ). He started studying philosophy there, during the Second World War, and entered the Society of Jesus in Girisonta on 7 September 1945. In 1950 he was accepted as a theology student at Maastricht, Netherlands. He studied for four years and was ordained a priest there, on 22 August 1953, followed by his final year of theology studies and future third-year novitiate.

He returned to Indonesia in 1958. In 1960 he was appointed professor of moral theology and canon law at Major Seminary of St. Paul Yogyakarta. In 1962 he was appointed Rector Seminary Yogyakarta, which is now called Institute of Philosophy-Theology.

15 November 1966 summoned to Jakarta to assist the Archbishop of Jakarta, Adrianus Djajasepoetra, as the Secretary of the archdiocese. Date 25 November 1967 was appointed Vicar General archdiocese Blok B concurrently parish priest Kebayoran Baru.

On 15 August 1970 Soekoto was ordained Archbishop of Jakarta by Justin Cardinal Darmojoewono in Senayan Jakarta. In the same year, Soekoto was elected Secretary Supreme Council of the Indonesian Bishops (MAWI).

The Pope appointed him Apostolic Administrator ad Nutum Sanctae sedis for Diocese of Bogor until 23 October 1994, when the new Bishop of Bogor, Michael Angkur was ordained.

Soekoto retired as archbishop of Jakarta on 10 November 1995, and moved to Girisonta Central Java. On 30 December 1995, he died at the age of 75 years, after leading the archdiocese for 25 years.

== Coat Archbishop of Jakarta ==
Soekoto chose the symbol of a shield Jakarta pictorial cross, perched upon the head of a lion roaring. Two sprigs of leaves and fruit jali edited on either side. Then a piece of ribbon that read Scio Cui Credidi. Meaning, lion head describes Leo the Great, Pope, and church scholars. "Protector and savior of the City of Rome from attack nations that have not been cultured." Jali make an analogy of a tree native-born bishop: Jali village, Village Gayamharjo. Sentence over the tape: "I know whom I have believed."

== Education ==
- HIS, Yogyakarta (1937)
- Minor Seminary, Yogyakarta (1943)
- High School Spiritual Life, Unggaran (1947)
- School of Philosophy, Jakarta (1950)
- School of Theology, The Netherlands (1954)
- Gregorian University in Rome (1955)
- Spirituality (Spirituality) in Muenster, West Germany (1955)
- Law of the Church in Rome (1958)

== Career ==
- Lecturer Seminary in Yogyakarta (1959-1966)
- Seminary Rector Yogyakarta (1962-1966)
- Secretary of the Archdiocese of Jakarta (1966-1967)
- Vicar General of the Archdiocese of Jakarta concurrently Parish Priest Block B (1967-1970)
- Archbishop of Jakarta (1970-1995)
- Secretary MAWI (1970)
- Nutum ad Apostolic Administrator for the Diocese of Bogor Sanctae sedis (1993-1994)

Catholic Church titles
Preceded by Adrianus Djajasepoetra	Archbishop of Jakarta; 1970–1995	Succeeded by Julius Darmaatmadja
