= Hironimus Pakaenoni =

Indonesian Catholic Archbishop

His Excellency The Most Reverend Hironimus Pakaenoni
- Archbishop of Kupang
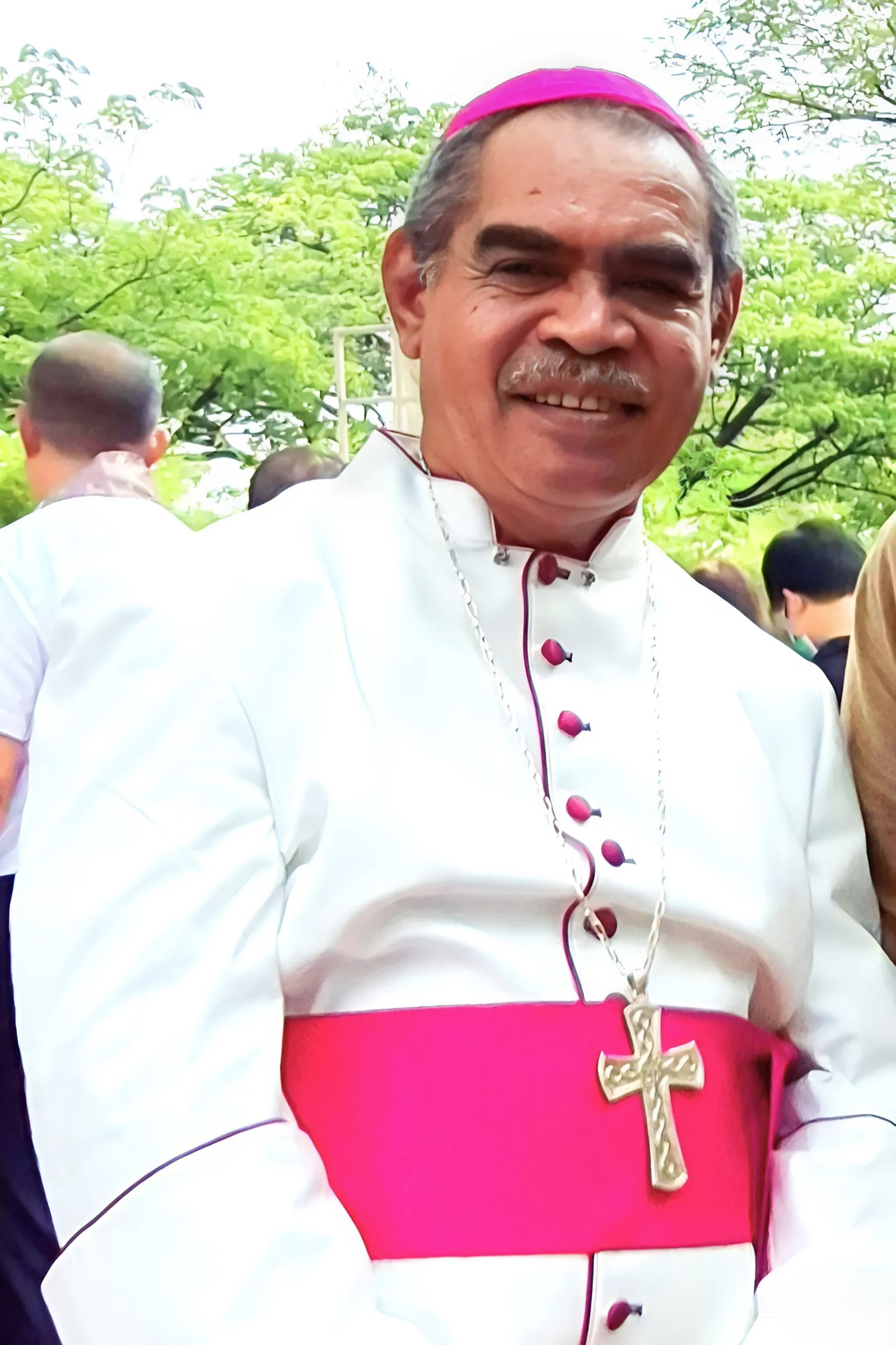
- Pakaenoni in 2024
- Church: Roman Catholic Church
- Archdiocese: Kupang
- Appointed: 9 March 2024
- Installed: 9 May 2024
- Predecessor: Peter Turang

Orders
- Ordination: 8 September 1997 by Peter Turang
- Consecration: 9 May 2024 by Piero Pioppo

Personal details
- Born: Hironimus Pakaenoni; 14 April 1969 (age 57) Noemuti, East Nusa Tenggara, Indonesia
- Education: Pontifical Urban University
- Motto: Pasce Oves Meas

Styles of Hironimus Pakaenoni
- Reference style: His Excellency; The Most Reverend
- Spoken style: Monsignor
- Religious style: Archbishop

Hironimus Pakaenoni (born 14 April 1969), sometimes Jerome Ronald Packaemonniy, is an Indonesian prelate of the Catholic Church who is the archbishop of the Archdiocese of Kupang since 2024. He was appointed Metropolitan Archbishop of the Roman Catholic Archdiocese of Kupang on 9 March 2024 to succeed Mons. Peter Turang.

== Early life and education ==
Hironimus Pakaenoni was born on 14 April 1969 in Noemuti, Kefamenanu, East Nusa Tenggara, Indonesia. He received his primary and secondary education in his home town. He began his formal education at Maria Immaculata Lalian, a minor seminary in Atambua, where he studied from 1985 to 1989,

Following his time at the minor seminary, Pakaenoni pursued further studies at the Institute of Philosophy and Creative Technology (IFTK) (formerly known as the Ledalero Catholic Philosophy School) in Maumere, Flores, from 1990 to 1994. He obtained a bachelor's degree in philosophy and theology there, and then he spent a year of pastoral service in Kupang.

After completing his philosophical studies, Pakaenoni proceeded to theological studies from 1995 to 1997.

== Ordination and ministry ==
Pakaenoni was ordained a deacon on 27 April 1997, and later ordained a priest on 8 September 1997 by Archbishop Peter Turang.

After his ordination, Pakaenoni initially served as a parish vicar at the Parish of St. Mary of the Assumption in Kupang from 1997 to 1999, followed by the role of parish priest at the St. Petrus Community in Sulamu, Kupang, from 1999 to 2001. He pursued further studies and earned a licentiate in dogmatic theology from the Pontifical Urban University in Rome, Italy, between 2001 and 2003. Subsequently, he held positions as a parish vicar at St. Gregory the Great in Oloeta from 2003 to 2004, and as a formator at the St. Michael Interdiocesan Major Seminary in Kupang.

Pakaenoni also served as a lecturer in dogmatic theology at the Universitas Katolik Widya Mandira in Kupang from 2004 onwards. He was also the dean of the Faculty of Philosophy of Religion at the same university from 2010 to 2018, and chairing the Swastisari Educational Foundation from 2012 to 2023.

During his priesthood, he held roles as an academician, college lecturer, and pastor in Kupang, in Oloeta, and in Sulamu, both in East Nusa Tenggara (1999–2001;2003-2004). He also served as the formator of the interdiocesan major seminary in Kupang (2004–2024) and chairman of the Swastiari Educational Foundation (2012–2023).

== Archbishop of Kupang ==
On 9 March 2024, Pope Francis appointed Pakaenoni as the archbishop of the Archdiocese of Kupang, succeeding the retiring Archbishop Peter Turang, and raised to the rank of Monsignor. His episcopal consecration was held on 9 May 2024. Pakaenoni's chosen motto was "Pasce Oves Meas", Latin for "Feed My Sheep".

Catholic Church titles
Preceded by Peter Turang	Archbishop of Kupang; 2024–present	Incumbent
