= Franciscus Nipa =

20th and 21st-century Roman Catholic Archbishop

His Excellency The Most Reverend Monsignor Franciscus Nipa
- Metropolitan Archbishop of Makassar
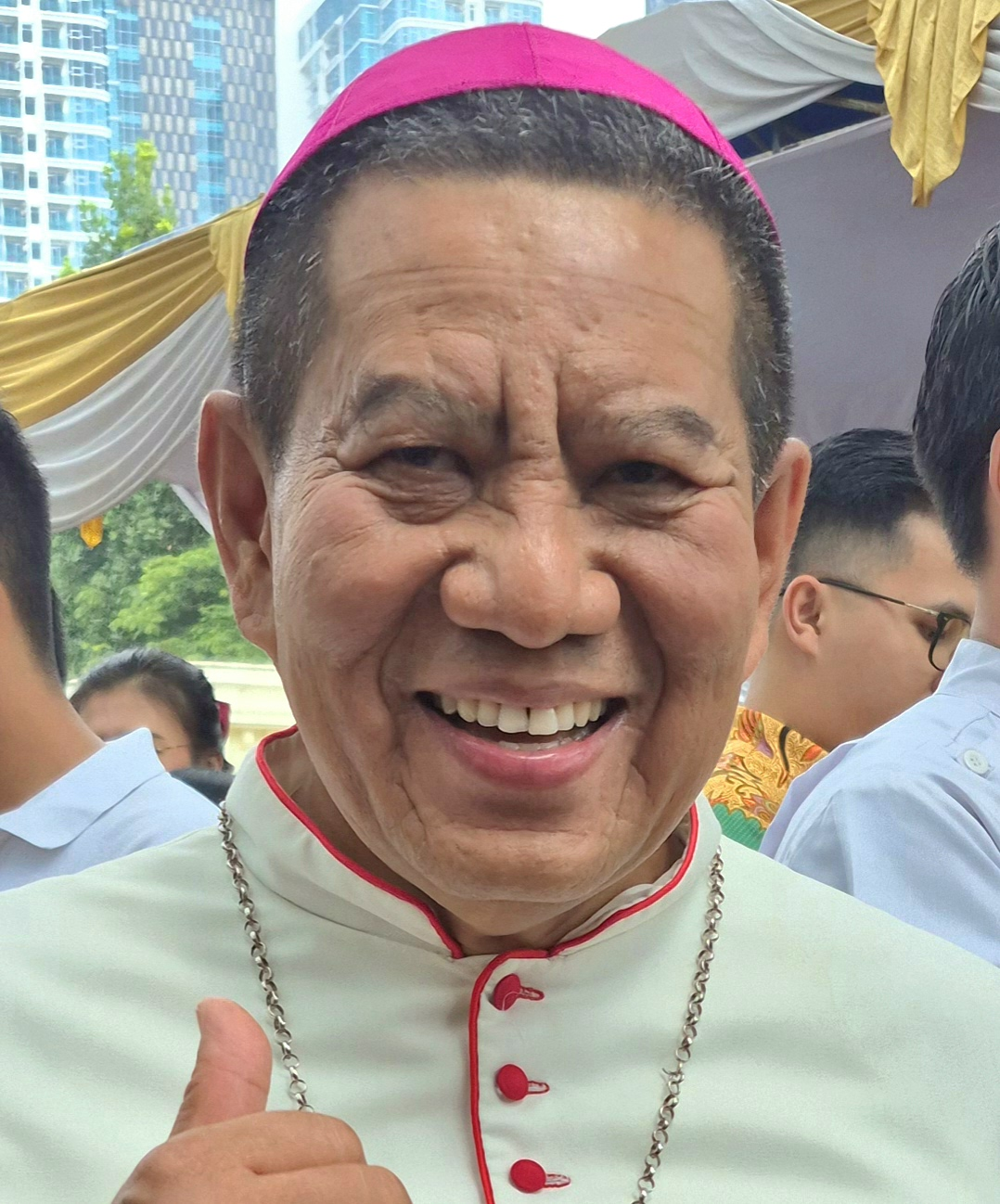
- Church: Roman Catholic Church
- Archdiocese: Makassar
- Previous posts: Board of Directors of the Archdiocesan Educational Foundation Paulus Presbyteral Council and College of Consultors, and Archdiocesan Council for Economic Affairs (2000-2023); Coadjutor Archbishop of Makassar (21 October 2023 - 17 October 2024)

Orders
- Ordination: 3 July 1990 by Franciscus van Roessel
- Consecration: 1 February by Piero Pioppo

Personal details
- Born: 29 January 1964 (age 62) Makassar, South Sulawesi
- Denomination: Roman Catholic
- Occupation: Archbishop, Prelate
- Education: Pontifical Urban University
- Motto: Misericordiam Volo (I will have mercy, and not the Sacrifice - Matthew 9:13)
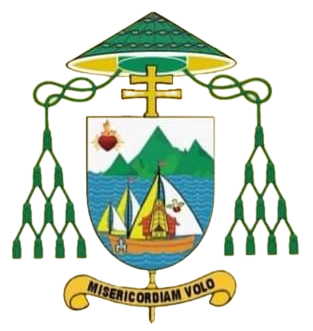
- Coat of arms

His Excellency, The Most Reverend, Monsignor. Franciscus Nipa is an Indonesian prelate of the Catholic Church and academician. He was appointed as the Coadjutor Archbishop of the Roman Catholic Archdiocese of Makassar on 21 October 2023. He has been the Metropolitan Archbishop of Makassar since 17 October 2024.

== Biography ==
Mons. Franciscus Nipa was born on January 29, 1964, in Makassar, South Sulawesi, Indonesia. He received his early education in his town. He attended St. Paul Seminary in Semarang, Central Java. He then attended the Wedabhakti Theological Faculty of Yogyakarta, where he studied philosophy and theology there. He was ordained a diocesan priest on July 3, 1990 in Makassar. After his ordination, he was assigned as a parish vicar in Messawa-Mamasa and as parish priest in Polewali Mandar. He is also alumnus of the Pontifical Urban University where he earned a licentiate degree in canon law in 2000. In 2000, he became defender of the bond of the ecclesiastical tribunal until 2005. He served as director of the Spiritual Orientation Year for seminarians of the archdiocese from 2000 to 2002. In 2002, he was appointed archdiocesan secretary-chancellor and special secretary to the archbishop. In addition, he has taught at the Catechetical-Pastoral Institute of Toraja. Finally, he has served as a member of various archdiocesan councils and commissions: board of directors of the Archdiocesan Educational Foundation Paulus; Presbyteral Council and College of Consultors, and Archdiocesan Council for Economic Affairs. On October 21, 2023, he was appointed by Pope Francis as Coadjutor Archbishop of the Roman Catholic Archdiocese of Makassar. His episcopal consecration will be held on February 1, 2024. On 17 October 2024, he has been installed at Makassar Cathedral.
