= Lauzadus =

Town of ancient Cilicia

Coordinates: 36°45′09″N 32°41′52″E

Lauzadus or Lauzadeai was a town of ancient Cilicia or of Isauria, inhabited in Byzantine times. It became a bishopric; no longer the seat of a residential bishop, it remains a titular see of the Roman Catholic Church.

Its site is located near Başyayla, a town in Karaman Province in the Central Anatolia region of Turkiye.
