= Adrianus Djajasepoetra =

Indonesian catholic archbishop

The Most Reverend Adrianus Djajasepoetra SJ
- Archbishop of Jakarta
- Church: Catholic Church
- Archdiocese: Jakarta
- Appointed: 18 February 1953 (as apostolic vicar)
- Installed: 3 January 1961 (as archbishop)
- Term ended: 21 May 1970
- Predecessor: Petrus Willekens
- Successor: Leo Soekoto
- Other posts: Titular Bishop of Trisipa (1953‍–‍1961); Titular Archbishop of Volsinium (1970‍–‍1976)

Orders
- Ordination: 15 August 1928
- Consecration: 23 April 1953 by Georges-Marie de Jonghe d'Ardoye

Personal details
- Born: 12 March 1894 Ngayogyakarta, Dutch East Indies
- Died: 10 July 1979 (aged 85) Semarang, Indonesia
- Buried: Kerkhof Muntilan
- Motto: In verbo autum Tuo (Latin for 'Because of Your word')

Ordination history
History
Episcopal consecration
- Principal consecrator: Georges-Marie de Jonghe d'Ardoye
- Co-consecrators: Albertus Soegijapranata; Pierre Martin Arntz

Adrianus Djajasepoetra, SJ (Perfected Spelling: Adrianus Jayaseputra; 12 March 1894 – 10 July 1979) was an Indonesian Roman Catholic prelate who served as the apostolic vicar of Jakarta (from 1953 to 1961) and later its archbishop (from 1961 to 1970). Before being an apostolic vicar, Mgr. Adrianus was a rector of St. Ignatius College, Yogyakarta and the 4th rector of Major Seminary, Kentungan, Yogyakarta (1948–1949).

== Life ==
Djajasepoetra was born in Ngayogyakarta in the Dutch East Indies on 12 March 1894. He studied theology in the Netherlands in 1919 just five years after the first Indonesian student. Djajasepoetra was known for supporting the Dutch missionaries who had endured much to bring Roman Catholicism to him and Indonesia. Djajasepoetra was possibly the second successful Javanese student to follow this route into the priesthood. He was ordained a priest in the Society of Jesus in 1928. Whilst still a young priest, Adrianus served at the Kota Baru and Pugeran Church in his home town of Yogyakarta. He was imprisoned by the Japanese at the Cipinang prison and Sukamiskin prison during the Second World War from 1943 to 1945.

Mgr. Adrianus was appointed Titular Bishop of Trisipa on 23 April 1953 by Pope Pius XII and consecrated by Apostolic Nuncio George-Marie de Jonghe D'Ardoye, with co-consecrator Mgr. Albertus Soegijapranata of Semarang and Mgr. Pierre Martin Arntz of Bandung. The most important event that happened in this period is the annexation of Diocese of Bogor to the Apostolic Prefect of Sukabumi and the territory was elevated to the Archdiocese of Djakarta.

The social politic circumstances in Indonesia made a serious impact on his leadership. Mgr. Adrianus strongly opposed the intrigue of the Guided Democracy era. In addition, inside the church there was a dramatic change after the Second Vatican Council that started to redefine the Roman Catholic church. Adrianus was a Council Father at the Second Vatican Council.

Mgr. Adrianus at the age of 76, requested his retirement to the Pope from his position as the Archbishop of Jakarta. He was appointed Titular Archbishop of Volsinium until his retirement on 10 July 1976. After being retired as the Archbishop of Jakarta, Mgr. Adrianus spent the rest of his life in Wisma Emmaus Girisonta, Ungaran. Djajasepoetra died at Semarang on 10 July 1979.

Catholic Church titles
New diocese Elevated from apostolic vicariate	Archbishop of Jakarta; 1961–1970	Succeeded by Leo Soekoto
Preceded by Petrus Willekens	Apostolic Vicar of Jakarta; 1953–1961	Elevated to archdiocese
Preceded by Joannes Panis	— TITULAR — Bishop of Trisipa; 1953–1961	Succeeded by Michael Joseph Green
New diocese	— TITULAR — Archbishop of Volsinium; 1970–1976	Succeeded by Nicolas Eugene Walsh
