= Archdiocese of Kupang =

Latin Catholic jurisdiction in Indonesia

Coordinates: 10.1833°S 123.5830°E

Archdiocese of Kupang Archidioecesis Kupangensis Keuskupan Agung Kupang

Catholic

Location
- Country: Indonesia
- Ecclesiastical province: Kupang

Statistics
- Area: 11,285 km^{2} (4,357 sq mi)
- Population: Total; Catholics: (as of 2004); 1,189,829; 125,123 (10.5%)

Information
- Denomination: Catholic Church
- Sui iuris church: Latin Church
- Rite: Roman Rite
- Cathedral: Cathedral of Christ the King in Kupang

Current leadership
- Pope: Leo XIV
- Metropolitan Archbishop: Jerome Ronald Packaemonniy

The Archdiocese of Kupang (Latin: Kupangensis) is a Latin Church archdiocese of the Catholic Church located in the city of Kupang, East Nusa Tenggara province in Indonesia.

== History ==
- 13 April 1967: Established as Diocese of Kupang from the Diocese of Atambua
- 23 October 1989: Promoted as Metropolitan Archdiocese of Kupang

== Leadership ==
- Archbishops of Kupang
  - Archbishop Jerome Ronald Packaemonniy (9 March 2024 - present)
  - Archbishop Peter Turang (10 October 1997 – 9 March 2024)
  - Archbishop Gregorius Manteiro, S.V.D. (23 October 1989 – 10 October 1997)
- Bishops of Kupang
  - Bishop Gregorius Manteiro, S.V.D. (later Archbishop) (13 April 1967 – 23 October 1989)

== Suffragan dioceses ==
- Atambua
- Weetebula

== Sources ==
- Official website
- GCatholic.org
- Catholic Hierarchy
