= Peter Turang =

Indonesian Catholic archbishop (1947–2025)

His Grace, The Most Reverend Peter Turang
- Archbishop Emeritus of Kupang
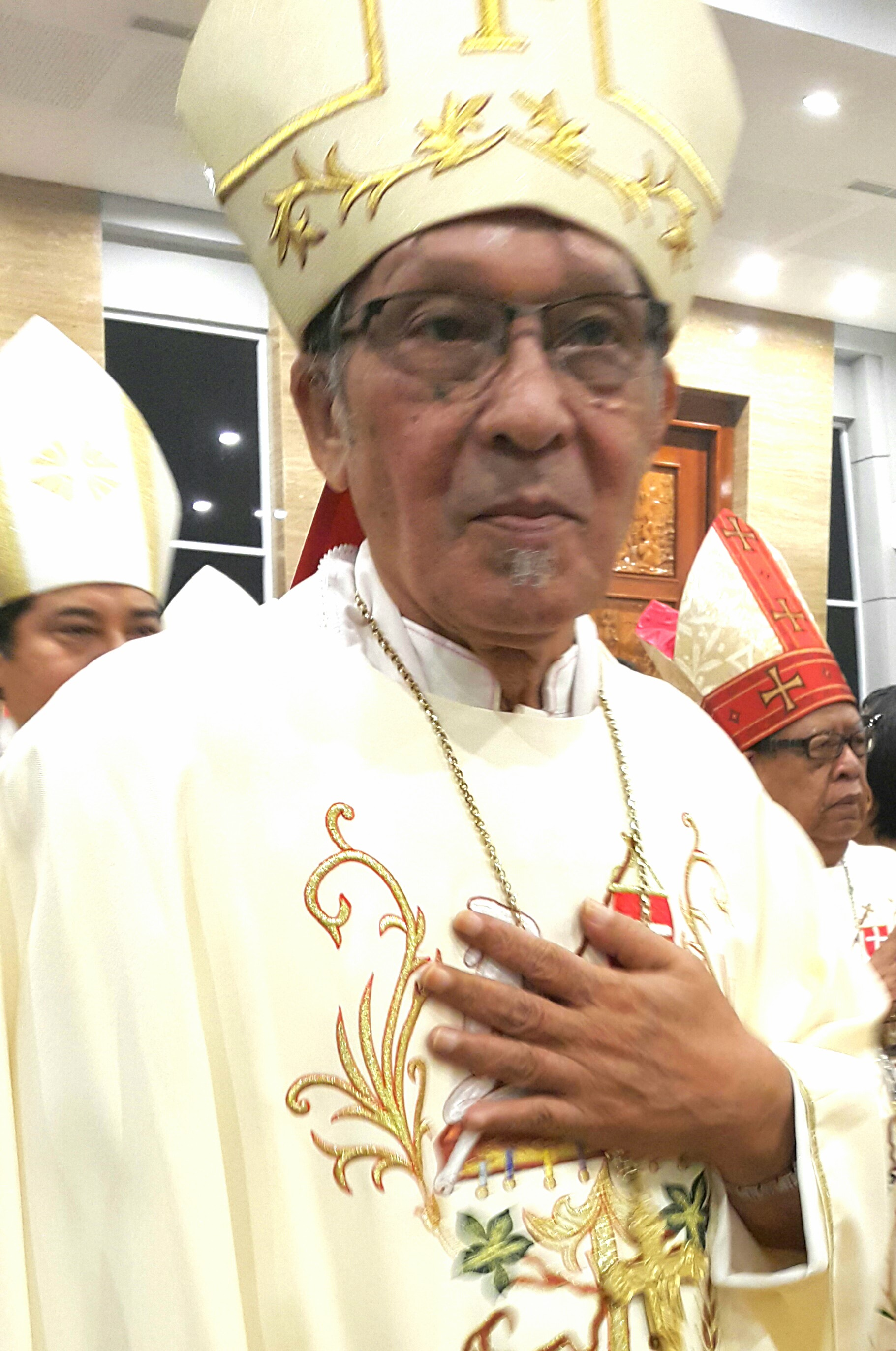
- Turang in 2017
- Church: Roman Catholic Church
- Archdiocese: Kupang
- Appointed: 10 October 1997
- Installed: 10 October 1997
- Term ended: 9 March 2024
- Predecessor: Gregorius Manteiro, S.V.D.
- Successor: Hironimus Pakaenoni

Orders
- Ordination: 18 December 1974 by Theodorus Hubertus Moors
- Consecration: 27 July 1997 by Julius Riyadi Cardinal Darmaatmadja, S.J.

Personal details
- Born: 23 February 1947 Tataaran, Minahasa Regency, North Sulawesi, Indonesia
- Died: 4 April 2025 (aged 78) Jakarta, Indonesia
- Motto: Petransiit benefaciendo (the benefits of doing good come around)
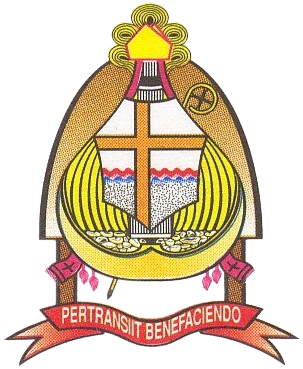
- Coat of arms

Styles of Peter Turang
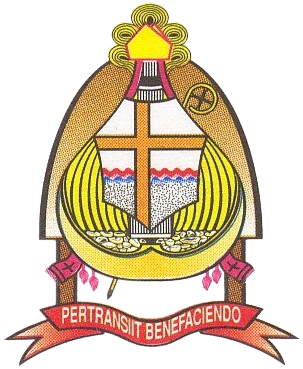
- Reference style: His Grace; The Most Reverend
- Spoken style: Your Excellency
- Religious style: Archbishop

Peter Turang (23 February 1947 – 4 April 2025), sometimes also known as Petrus Turang, was an Indonesian prelate of the Roman Catholic Church. He served as the Archbishop of Kupang from 1997 to 2024.

== Early life ==
Turang was born in Tataaran, Minahasa Regency, in North Sulawesi on 23 February 1947.

== Career ==
=== Priesthood ===
Turang was ordained a priest on 18 December 1974. He held the position of executive secretary of the Indonesian Economic and Social Development Commission at the Bishops' Conference of Indonesia.

=== Archbishop ===
On 21 April 1997, Turang was appointed coadjutor archbishop of the Archdiocese of Kupang to succeed the then-current archbishop, Gregorius Manteiro, who was in poor health. On 27 July 1997, Turang was ordained bishop by Cardinal Julius Darmaatmadja. He officially succeeded Manteiro upon the latter's death on 10 October 1997.

Turang caused some controversy in the Indonesian Catholic community when he reprimanded a priest named Yohanes Subani. Subani, an educator and instructor at St. Michael High Seminary in Kupang, did not kiss Turang's ring on 10 January 2013 after a joint Christmas celebration at Kupang Cathedral Church, prompting Turang to publicly admonish him in front of the congregation. Both Turang and, to a lesser extent, Subani were criticised for their conduct. Turang initially defended his actions but later issued an apology.

== Personal life ==
In 2022, Turang celebrated the 25th anniversary of his episcopal ordination, and in 2024, he celebrated the 50th anniversary of his priestly ordination.

=== Illness and death ===
Turang had been battling health issues for years, particularly heart disease. Before retiring as archbishop, he had already undergone medical procedures, including the placement of three stents to address his heart condition.

In early January 2025, Turang's health began to decline, leading to frequent hospital visits. As his condition worsened, he was referred to Pondok Indah Hospital in Jakarta in March for further treatment. Over the course of a month, his condition became more severe due to complications affecting his heart, lungs and kidneys. Despite receiving intensive care medicine, his health continued to deteriorate.

On the morning of 4 April 2025, Turang died at the age of 78. His body was temporarily placed at Jakarta Cathedral before being transported to Kupang on 5 April for final rites and burial.
