= Roman Catholic Archdiocese of Jakarta =

Roman Catholic archdiocese on Java, Indonesia

Archdiocese of Jakarta Archidioecesis Giakartana Keuskupan Agung Jakarta

Catholic
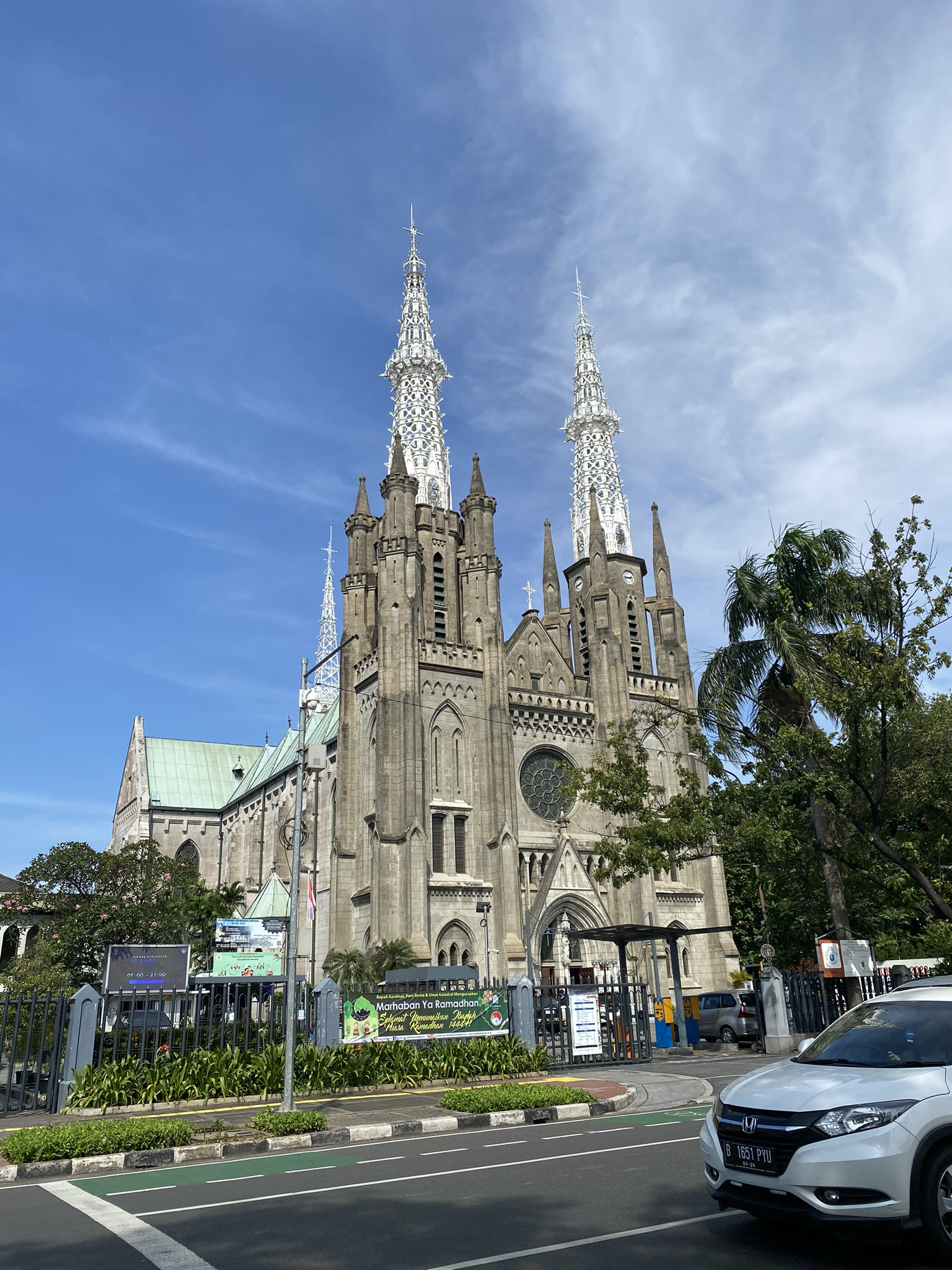
- Jakarta Cathedral

- Logo

Location
- Country: Indonesia
- Territory: Jakarta; Banten (Tangerang, South Tangerang, Tangerang Regency); West Java (Bekasi, Bekasi Regency)
- Ecclesiastical province: Province of Jakarta
- Headquarters: Jalan Katedral No. 7, Sawah Besar, Central Jakarta
- Coordinates: 6.1667°S 106.8170°E

Statistics
- Area: 10,775 km^{2} (4,160 sq mi)
- Population: Total; Catholics: (as of 2021); 20,411,000; 536,598 (2.6%)
- Parishes: 67 parishes

Information
- Denomination: Catholic Church
- Sui iuris church: Latin Church
- Rite: Roman Rite
- Established: 8 May 1807; 219 years ago
- Cathedral: Jakarta Cathedral
- Patron saint: Our Lady of the Assumption
- Language: Indonesian language

Current leadership
- Pope: Leo XIV
- Metropolitan Archbishop: Ignatius Suharyo
- Suffragans: Bandung; Bogor
- Vicar General: Samuel Pangestu
- Bishops emeritus: Julius Darmaatmadja

Map
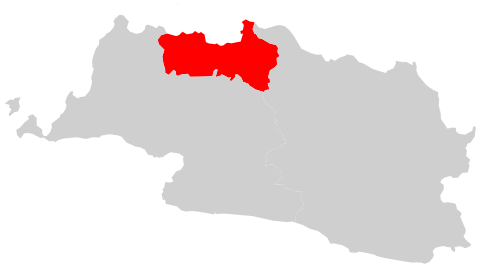
- Location of the Archdiocese of Jakarta in the Ecclesiastical Province of Jakarta

Website
- kaj.or.id

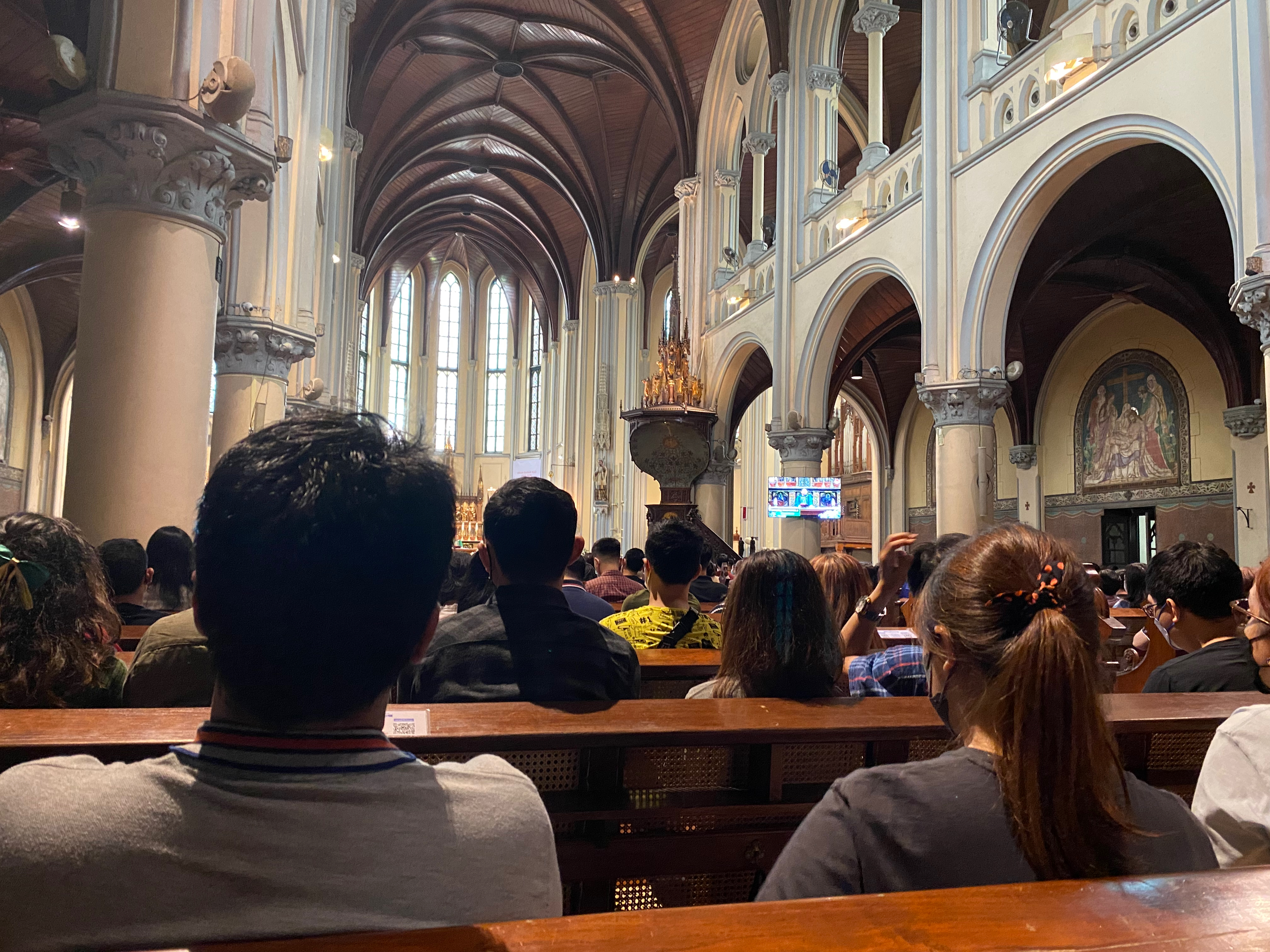
Jakarta Cathedral parishioners

The Roman Catholic Archdiocese of Jakarta (Latin: Giakartana) is a metropolitan Latin archdiocese on Java, in Indonesia.

Its cathedral episcopal see is the Assumption of the Blessed Virgin Mary Parish, in the national capital Jakarta.

== History ==
- Established on 8 May 1807 as the Apostolic Prefecture of Batavia, on territory split off from the Apostolic Prefecture of Islands of the Indian Ocean.
- Elevated on 3 April 1841 to the Apostolic Vicariate of Batavia, hence entitled to a titular bishop.
- It lost vast territories frequently to various split-off missions: in 1855 to establish the Apostolic Prefecture of Labuan and Borneo, on 22 December 1902 to establish the Apostolic Prefecture of Dutch New Guinea, on 11 February 1905 to establish the Apostolic Prefecture of Dutch Borneo, on 30 June 1911 to establish the Apostolic Prefecture of Sumatra, on 16 June 1913 to establish the Apostolic Prefecture of Lesser Sunda Islands, on 19 November 1919 to establish the Apostolic Prefecture of Celebes (now Sulawesi), on 27 April 1927 to establish the Apostolic Prefecture of Malang, on 15 February 1928 to establish the Apostolic Prefecture of Surabaia, on 20 April 1932 to establish the Apostolic Prefecture of Bandung, on 25 April 1932 to establish the Apostolic Prefecture of Purwokerto, on 25 June 1940 to establish the Apostolic Vicariate of Semarang, and on 9 December 1948 to establish the Apostolic Prefecture of Sukabumi.
- Renamed on 7 February 1950 after its see as the Apostolic Vicariate of Djakarta.
- Elevated on 3 January 1961 to the Metropolitan Archdiocese of Djakarta, making it directly dependent on the Holy See.
- It enjoyed a pastoral visit by Pope Paul VI on 3–4 December 1970.
- Renamed on 22 August 1973 as the Metropolitan Archdiocese of Jakarta.
- It enjoyed a pastoral visit by Pope John Paul II on 9–14 October 1989.
- It enjoyed a pastoral visit by Pope Francis on 3–6 September 2024.

== Leadership ==
=== Ordinaries ===
==== Apostolic Prefects of Batavia ====
- R.D. Jacobus Nelissen (8 May 1807 – 6 December 1817, died)
- R.D. Lambertus Prinsen (6 December 1817 – 5 February 1830, resigned)
- R.D. Joannes Scholten (10 September 1831 – 3 February 1842, resigned)

==== Apostolic Vicars of Batavia ====
- Jacobus Grooff (20 September 1842 – 19 April 1852, died)
- Petrus Vrancken (19 April 1852 – 28 May 1874, retired)
- Adam Claessens (16 June 1874 – 23 May 1893, resigned)
- Walterus Staal, S.J. (23 May 1893 – 30 June 1897, died)
- Edmundus Luypen, S.J. (21 May 1898 – 1 May 1923, died)
- Anton van Velsen, S.J. (21 January 1924 – March 1933, resigned)
- Petrus Willekens, S.J. (23 July 1934 – 7 February 1950, renamed)

==== Apostolic Vicars of Djakarta ====
- Petrus Willekens, S.J. (7 February 1950 – 23 May 1952, resigned)
- Adrianus Djajasepoetra, S.J. (18 February 1953 – 3 January 1961, elevated)

==== Archbishops of Djakarta ====
- Adrianus Djajasepoetra, S.J. (3 January 1961 – 21 May 1970, retired)
- Leo Soekoto, S.J. (21 May 1970 – 22 August 1973, renamed)

==== Archbishops of Jakarta ====
- Leo Soekoto, S.J. (22 August 1973 – 30 December 1995, died)
- Julius Cardinal Darmaatmadja, S.J. (30 December 1995 – 28 June 2010, retired)
- Ignatius Cardinal Suharyo (28 June 2010 – present)

=== Titular prelates ===
==== Coadjutor Apostolic Vicar of Batavia ====
- Petrus Vrancken (4 June 1847 – 19 April 1852, position changed)

==== Diocesan Administrator of the Vicar of Djakarta ====
- R.P.C. Doumen, S.J. (23 May 1952 – 18 February 1953, job completed)

==== Diocesan Administrator of Jakarta ====
- R.P. Martinus Soenarwidjaja, S.J. (30 December 1995 – 11 January 1996, job completed)

==== Coadjutor Archbishop of Jakarta ====
- Ignatius Suharyo (25 July 2009 – 28 June 2010, position changed)

== Ecclesiastical province ==
Its ecclesiastical province comprises the metropolitan's own archdiocese and two suffragan daughter dioceses, both also on Java island:

- Roman Catholic Diocese of Bandung
- Roman Catholic Diocese of Bogor

== Churches ==
The archdiocese is divided into nine deaneries.

Central Deanery

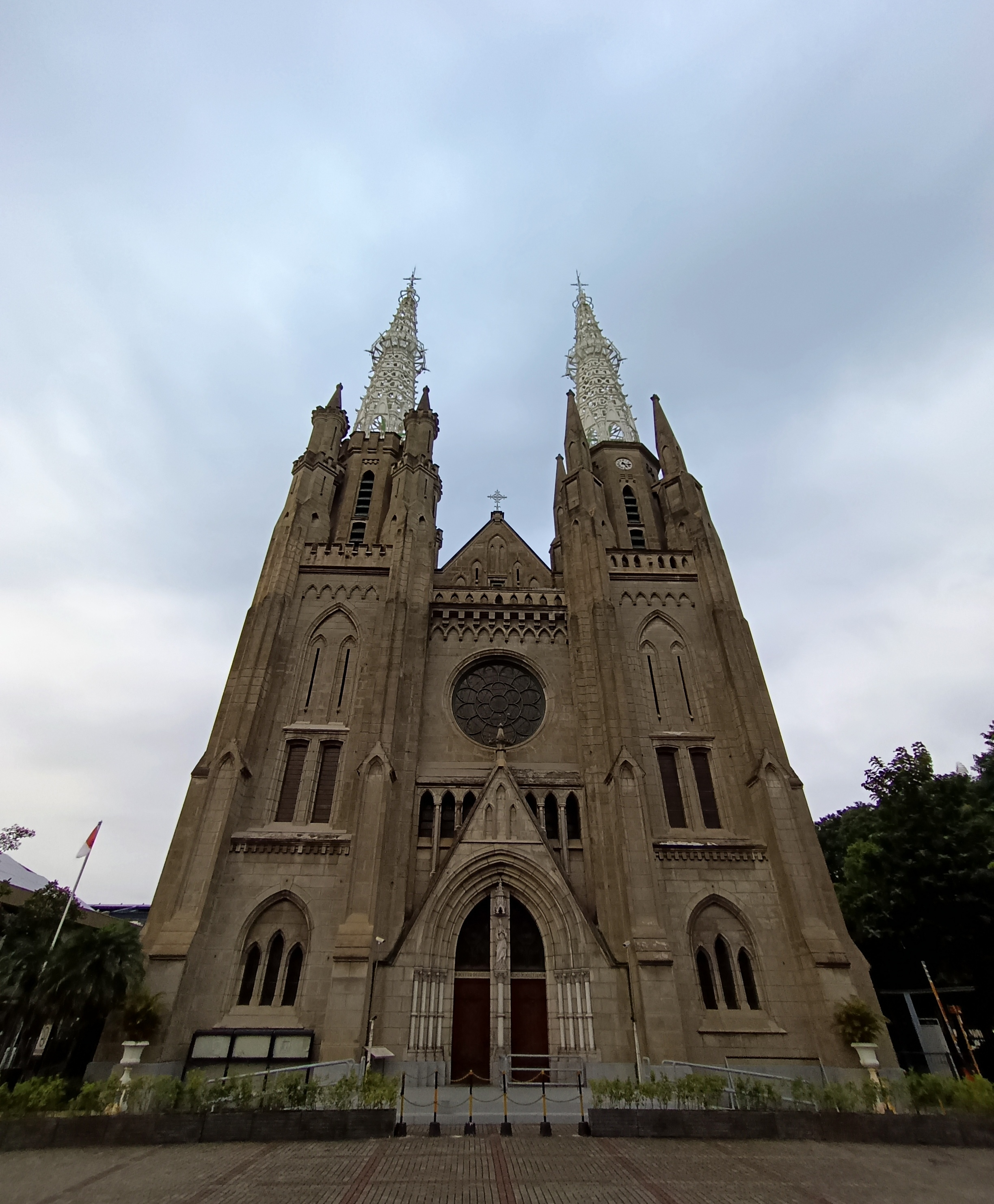
Jakarta Cathedral

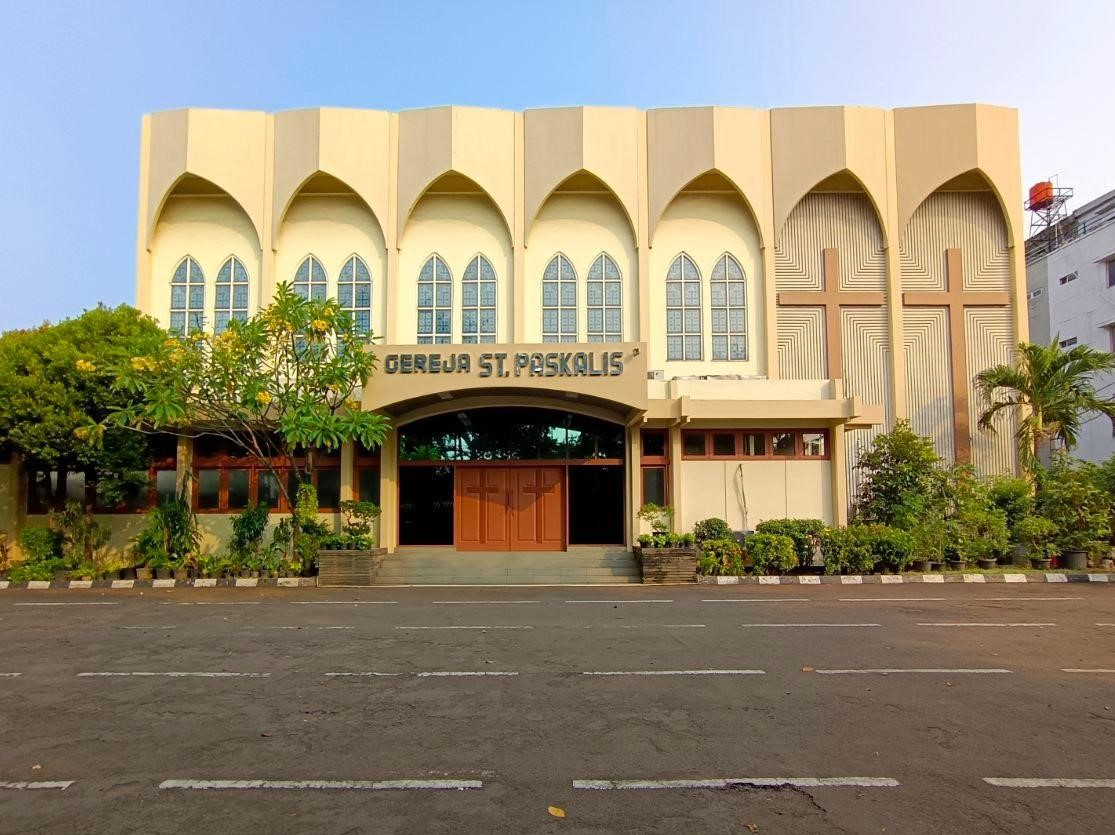
Church of Saint Paschal (Cempaka Putih)

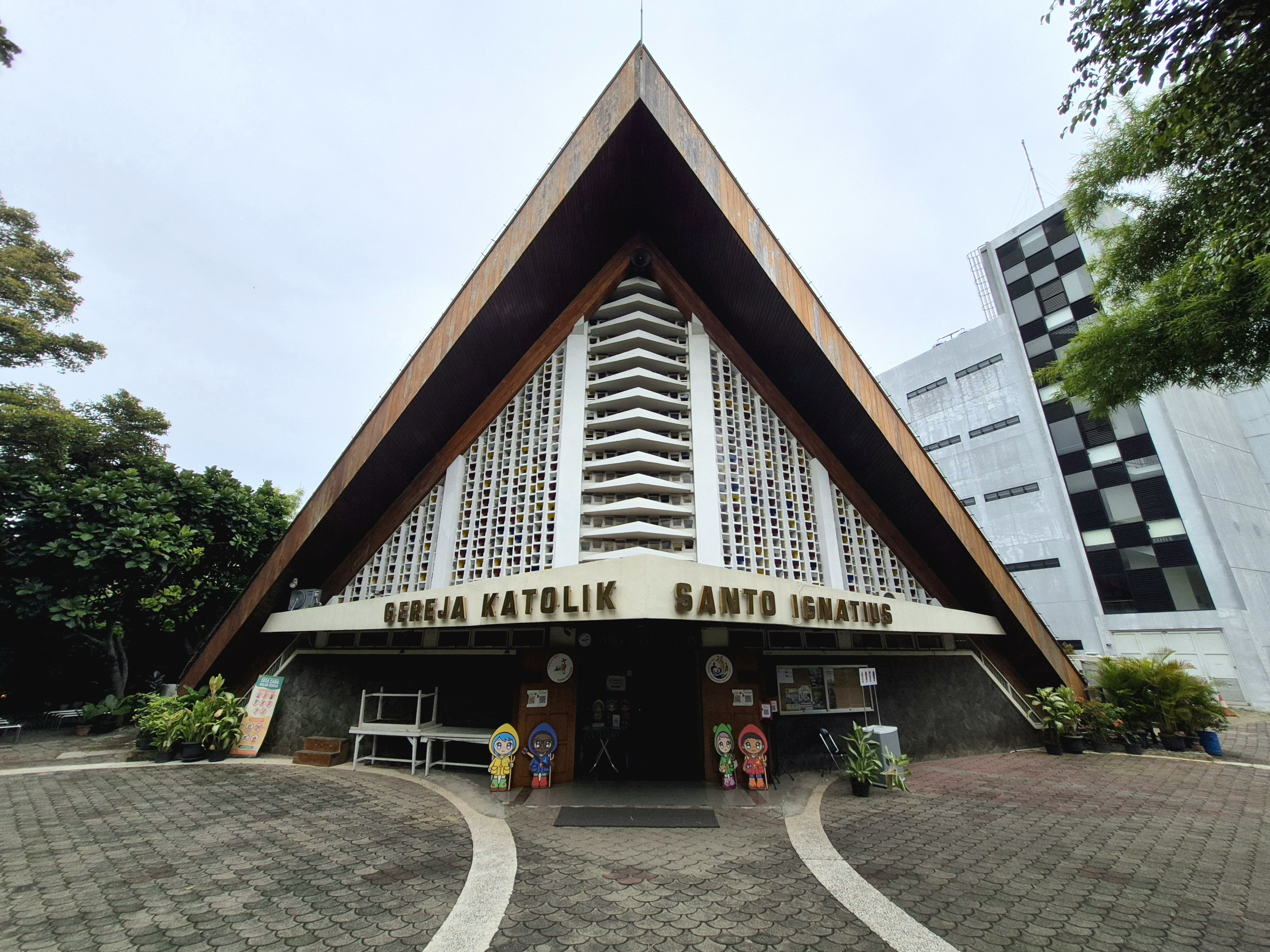
Church of Saint Ignatius Loyola (Jalan Malang)

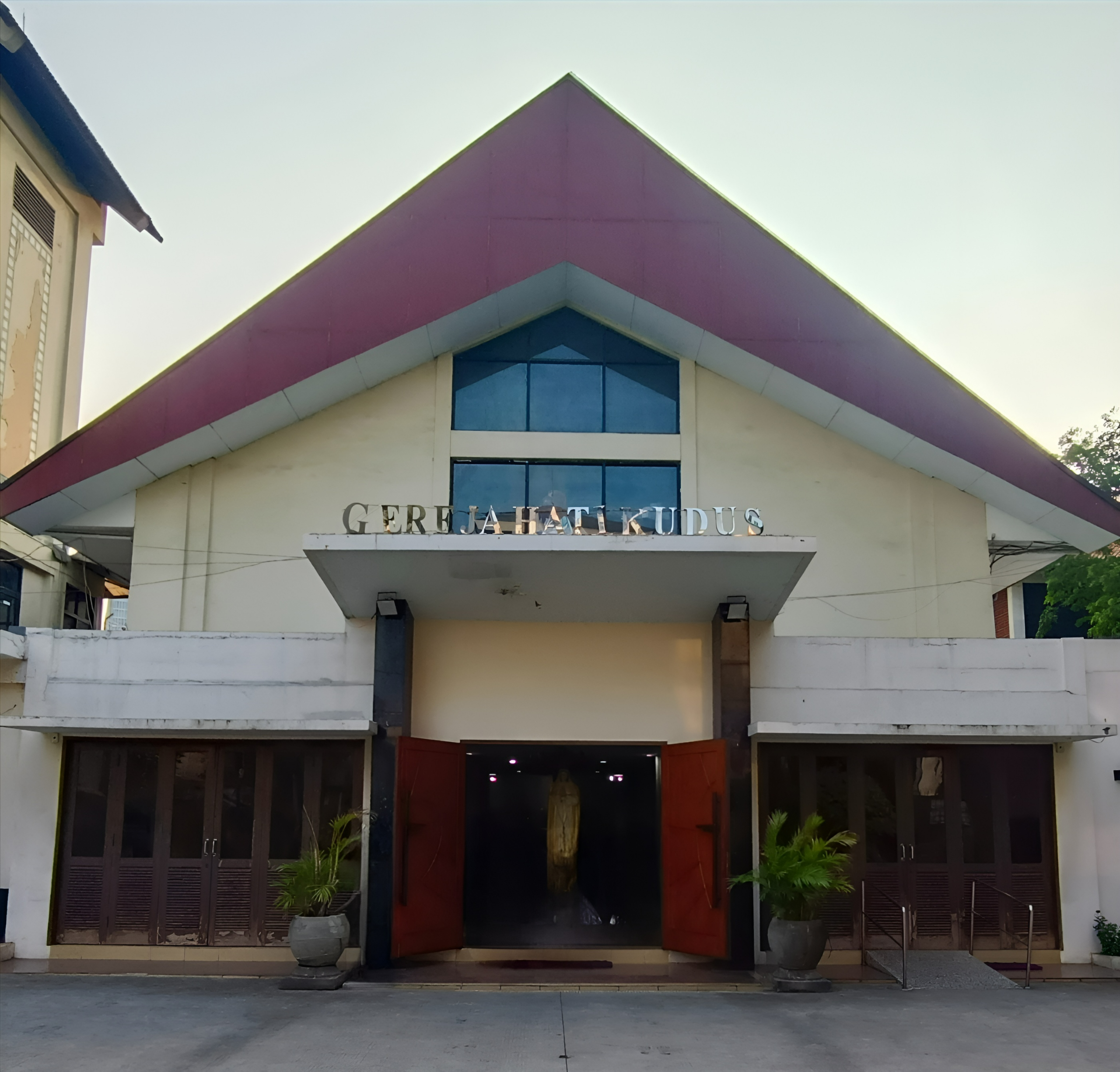
Church of the Sacred Heart (Kramat)

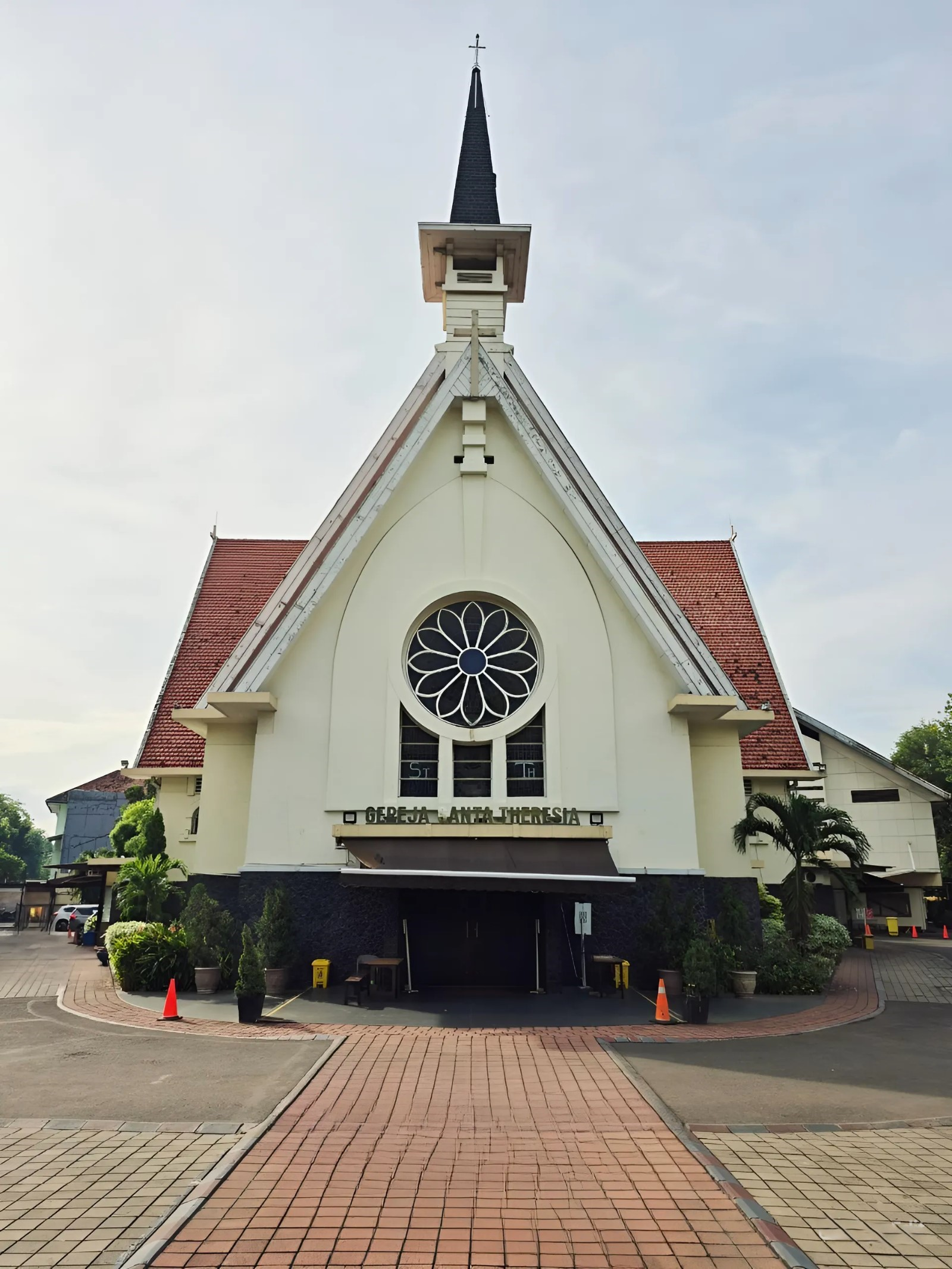
Church of Saint Therese (Menteng)

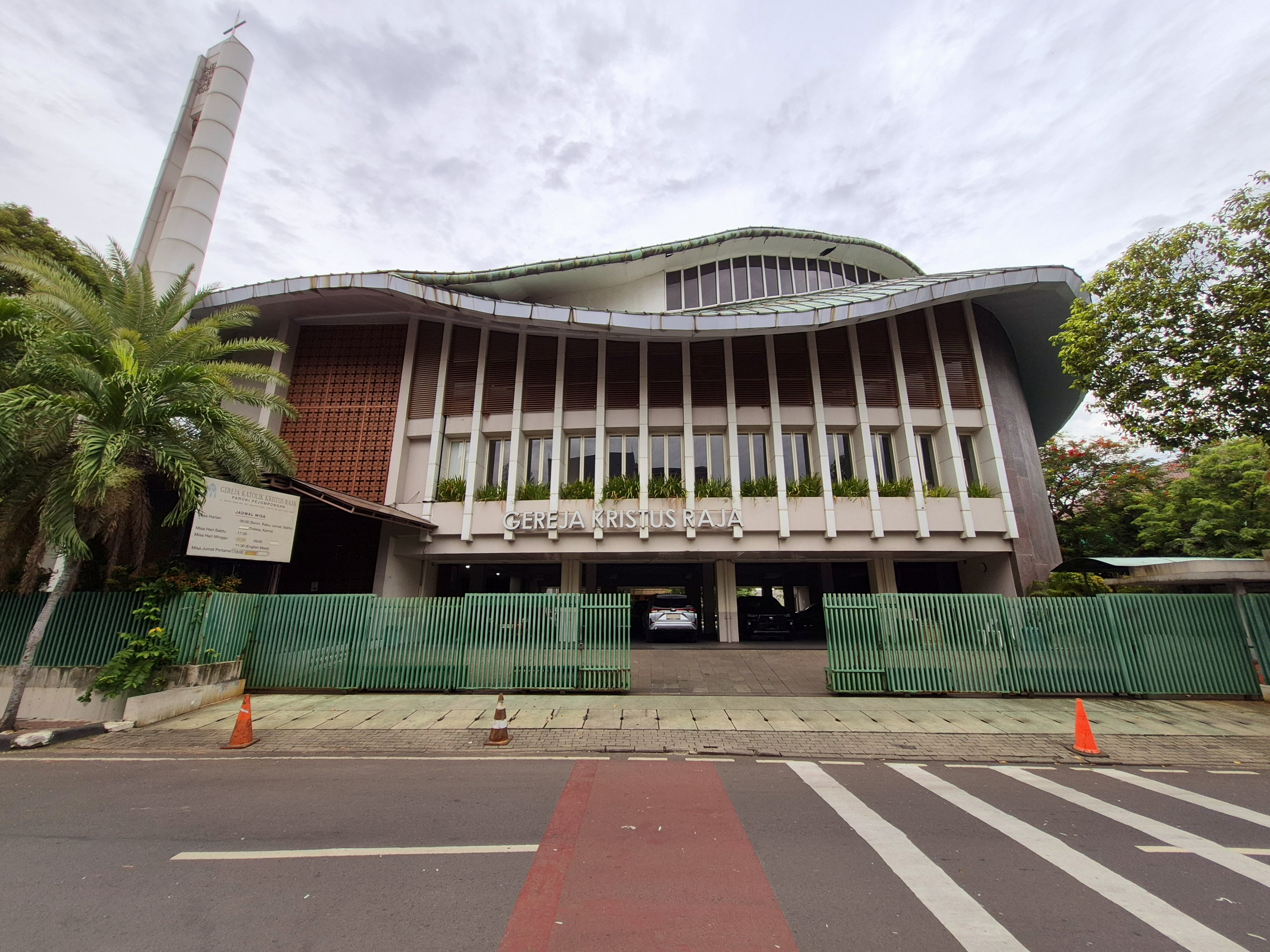
Church of Christ the King (Pejompongan)

West Deanery I

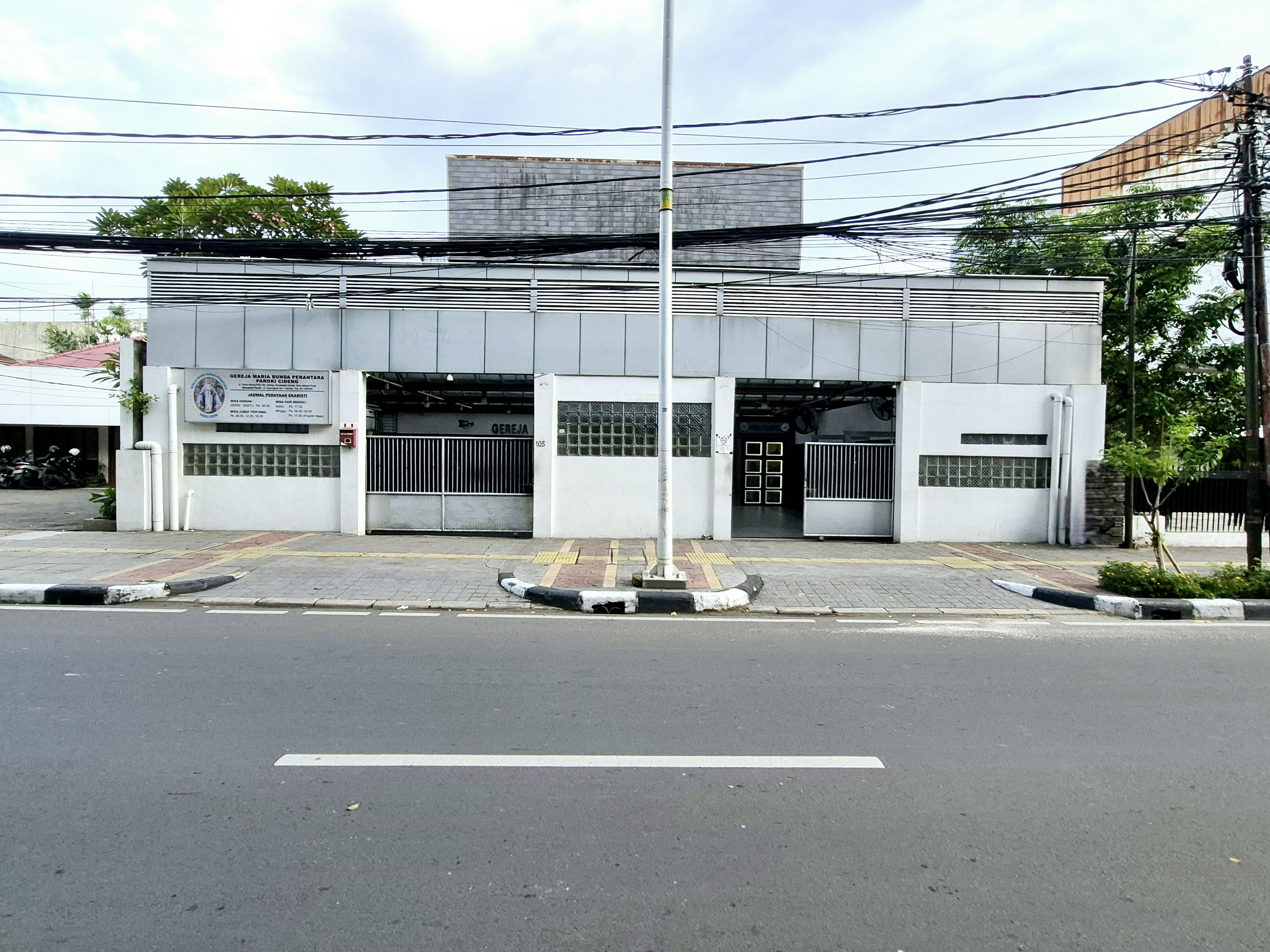
Church of Our Lady Mediatrix, Cideng

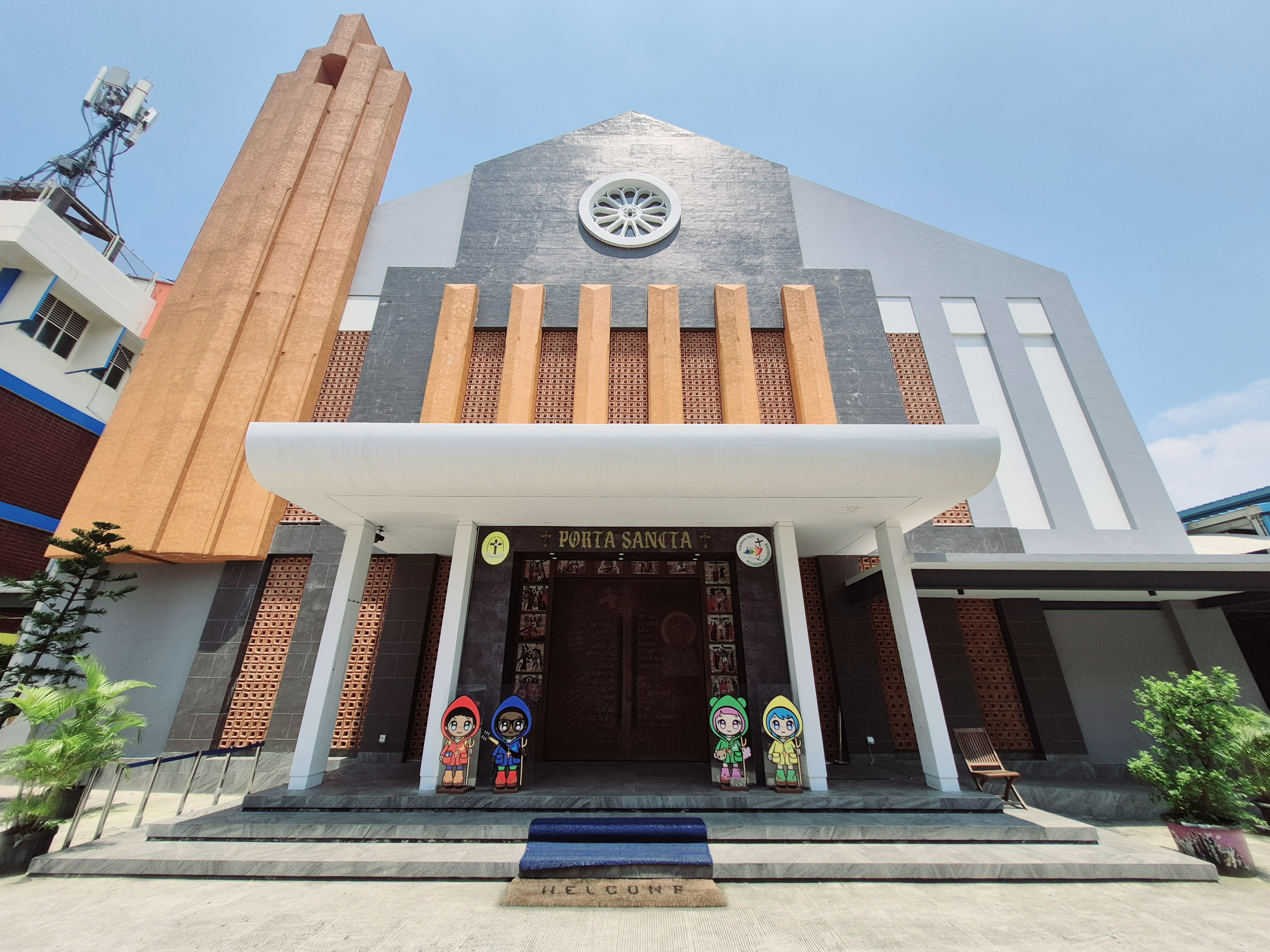
Church of Christ the Peace, Kampung Duri

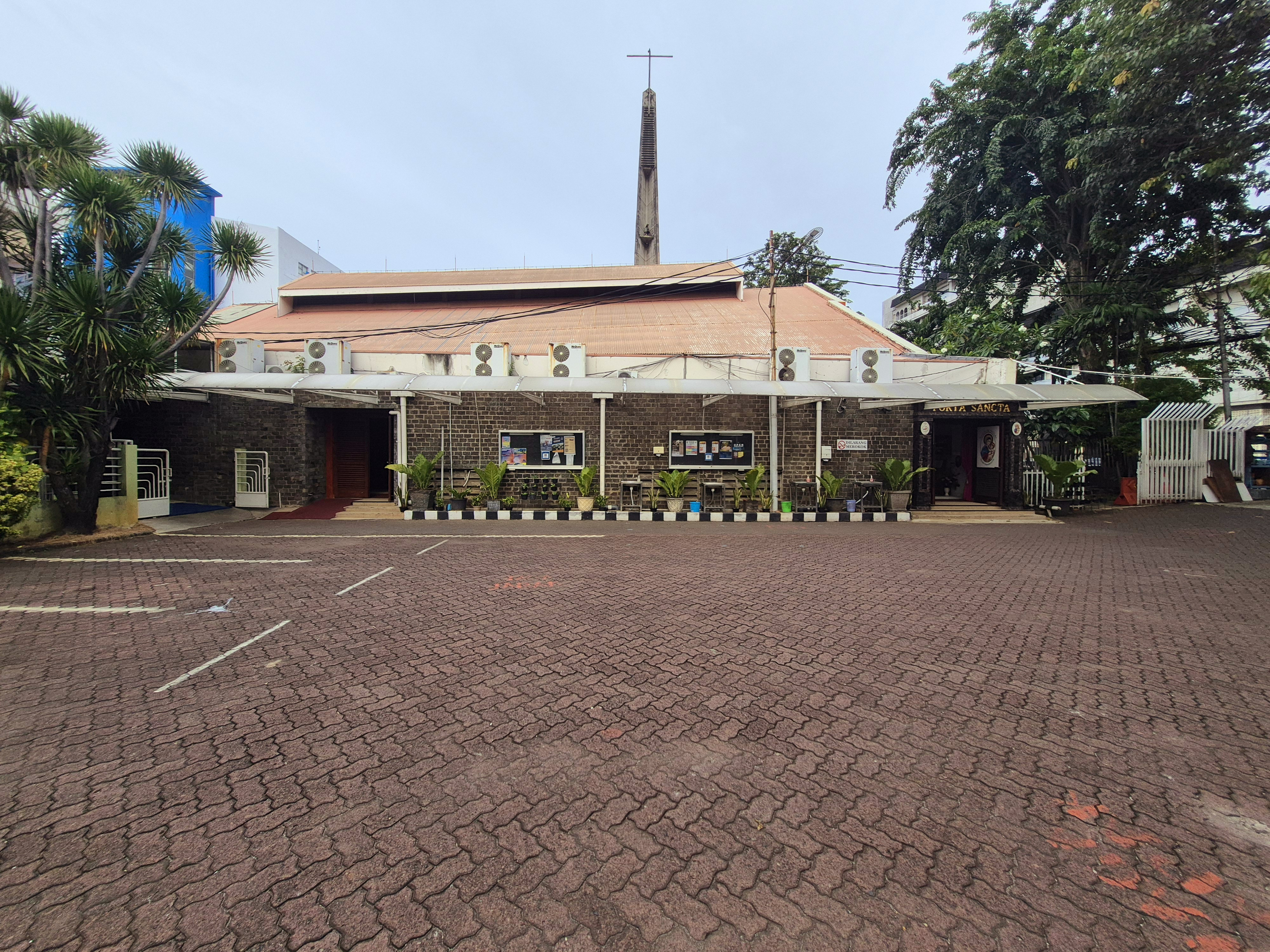
Church of Our Lady of the Sacred Heart, Kemakmuran

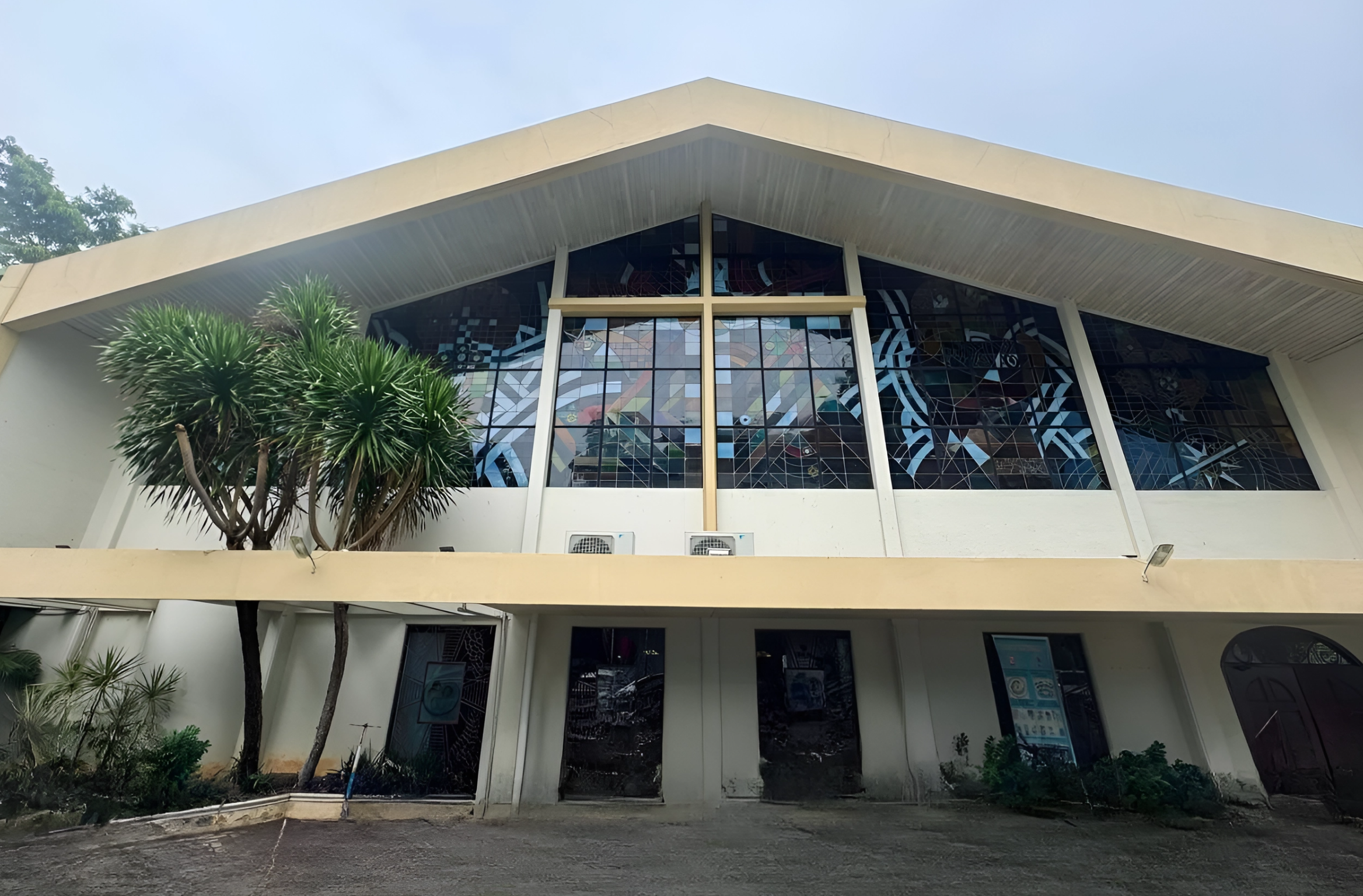
Church of Saints Peter and Paul, Mangga Besar

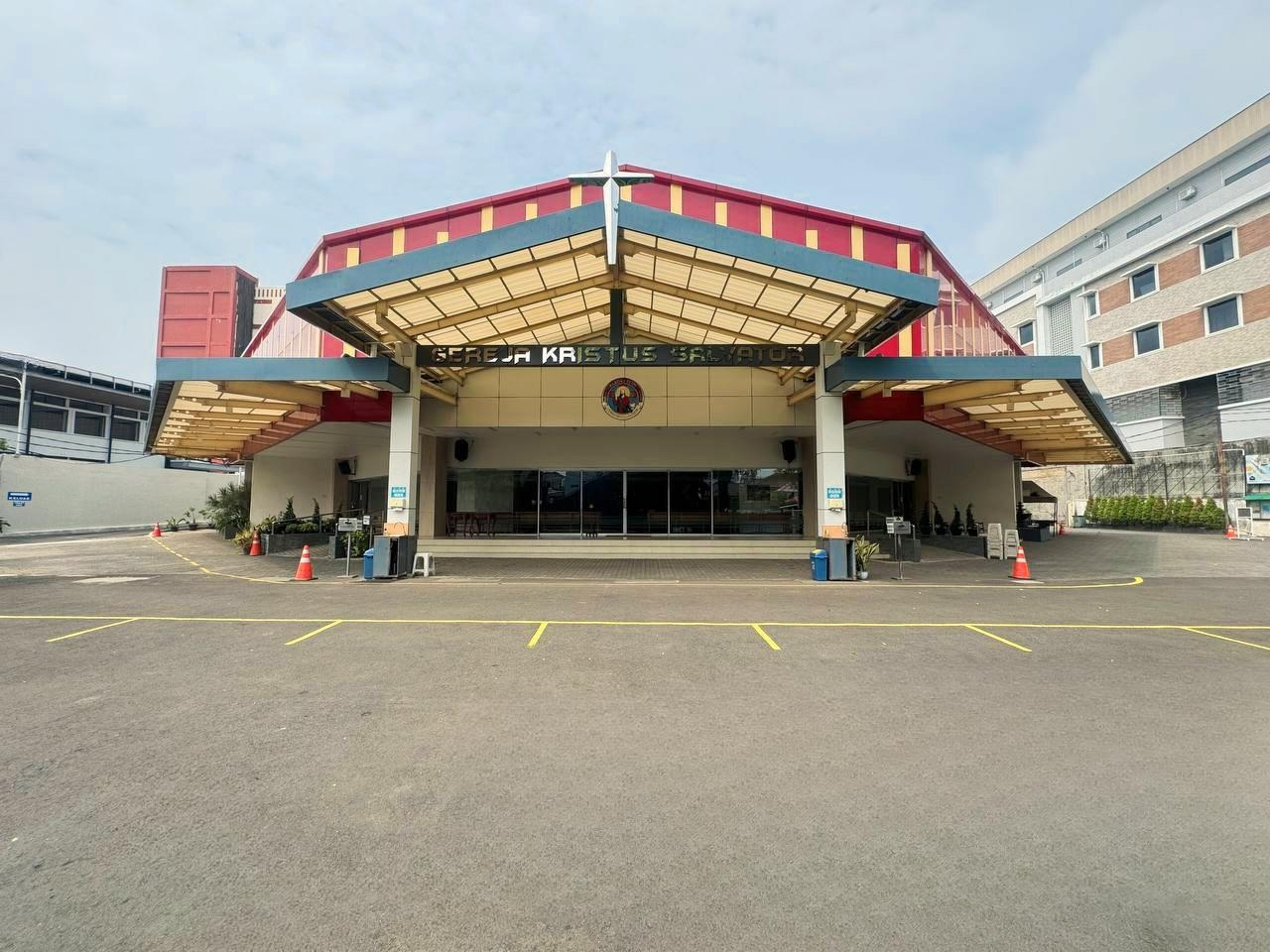
Church of Christ the Savior, Slipi

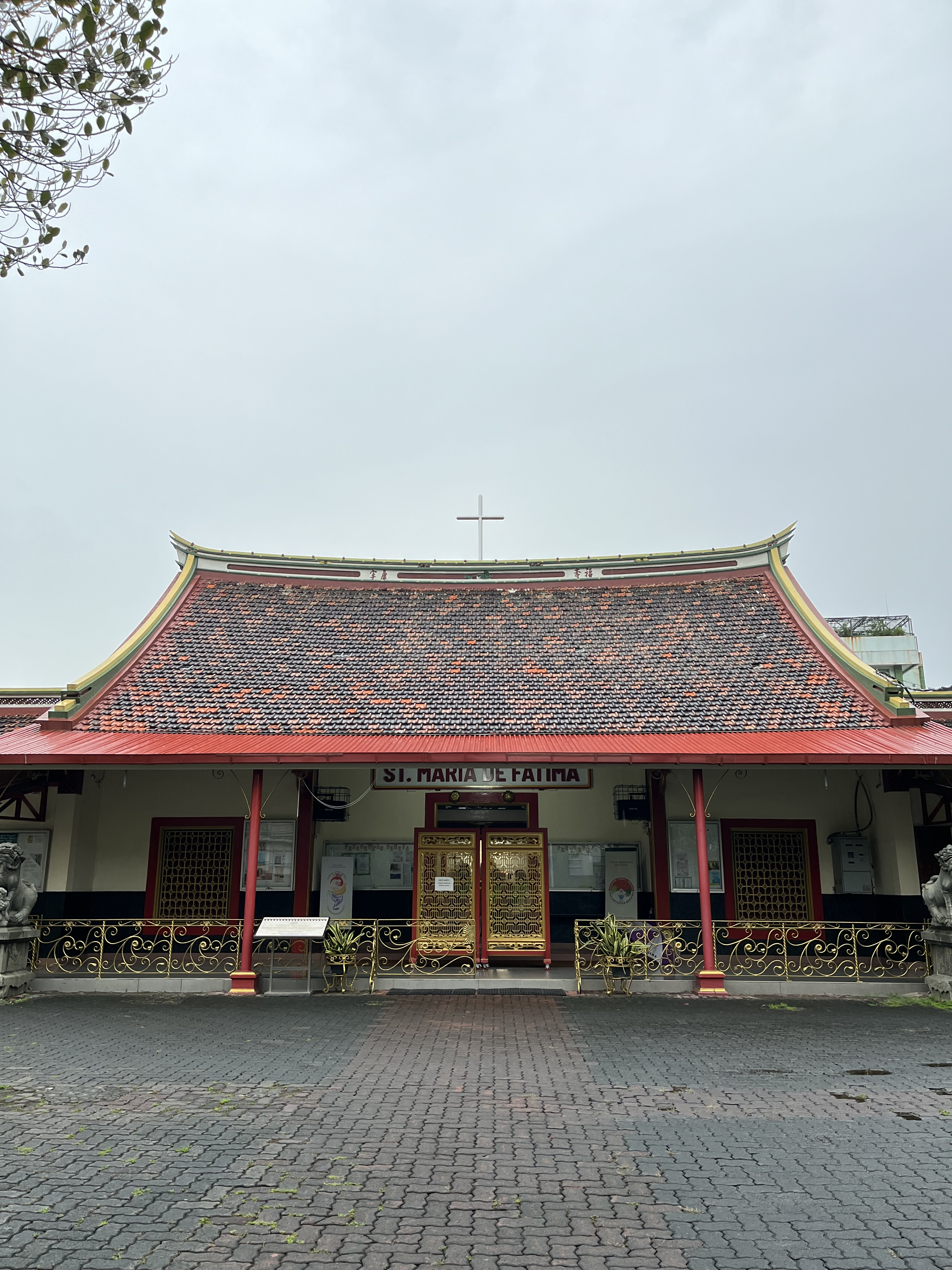
Church of Saint Mary of Fatima, Toasebio

== See also ==
- Catholic Church in Indonesia

== Sources and external links ==
- GCatholic.org with incumbent biography links
- Catholic Hierarchy
- Official website
