= Joseph Theodorus Suwatan =

Prelate of the Indonesian Catholic Church

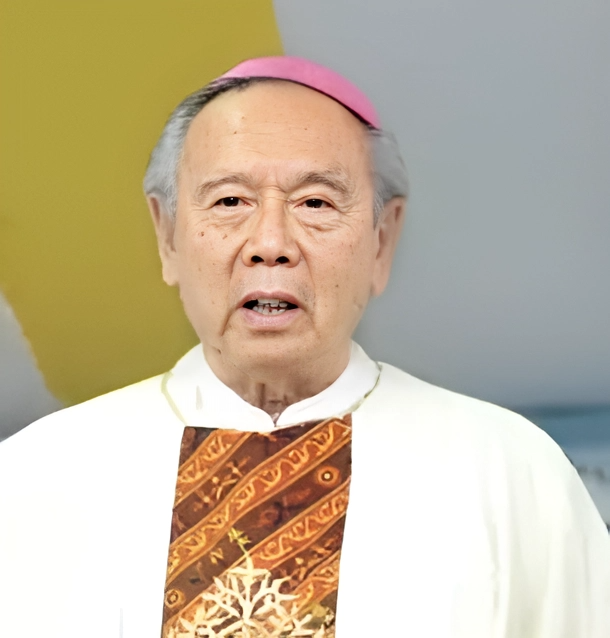
Joseph Theodorus Suwatan

Joseph Theodorus Suwatan M.S.C. (born 10 April 1940) is an Indonesian Catholic priest and from 1990 to 2017 the bishop of the diocese Manado.

== Biography ==
Suwatan was born in Tegal on 10 April 1940, was ordained a priest of the Order Missionaries of the Sacred Heart of Jesus on 8 January 1969. Consecrated bishop of Manado on 29 June 1990. From 1997 to 2000 he was head of the episcopal conference on Indonesia. He stepped down as bishop in 2017.

Bishop Suwatan had many roles in Poso riots in Poso, Central Sulawesi. In 2001 he urged the international community to prevent genocide in Poso. He also led the celebration of the Eucharist to give last respects to Father Tarcisius Dewanto, SJ, a member of the Society of Jesus Province of Indonesia, which involved a victim of violence in East Timor, in the complex Church of Nossa Senhora de Fatima, Suai on 6 or 7 September 1999.

Before that, in his capacity as chairman of KWI (Bishops' Conference of Indonesia) - and in connection with the anniversary of Indonesian independence in 1999 - he wrote a harsh statement condemning the leaders of countries that fail to serve the interests of the people, and called for an end to widespread corruption within the government.
