= List of cathedrals in Indonesia =

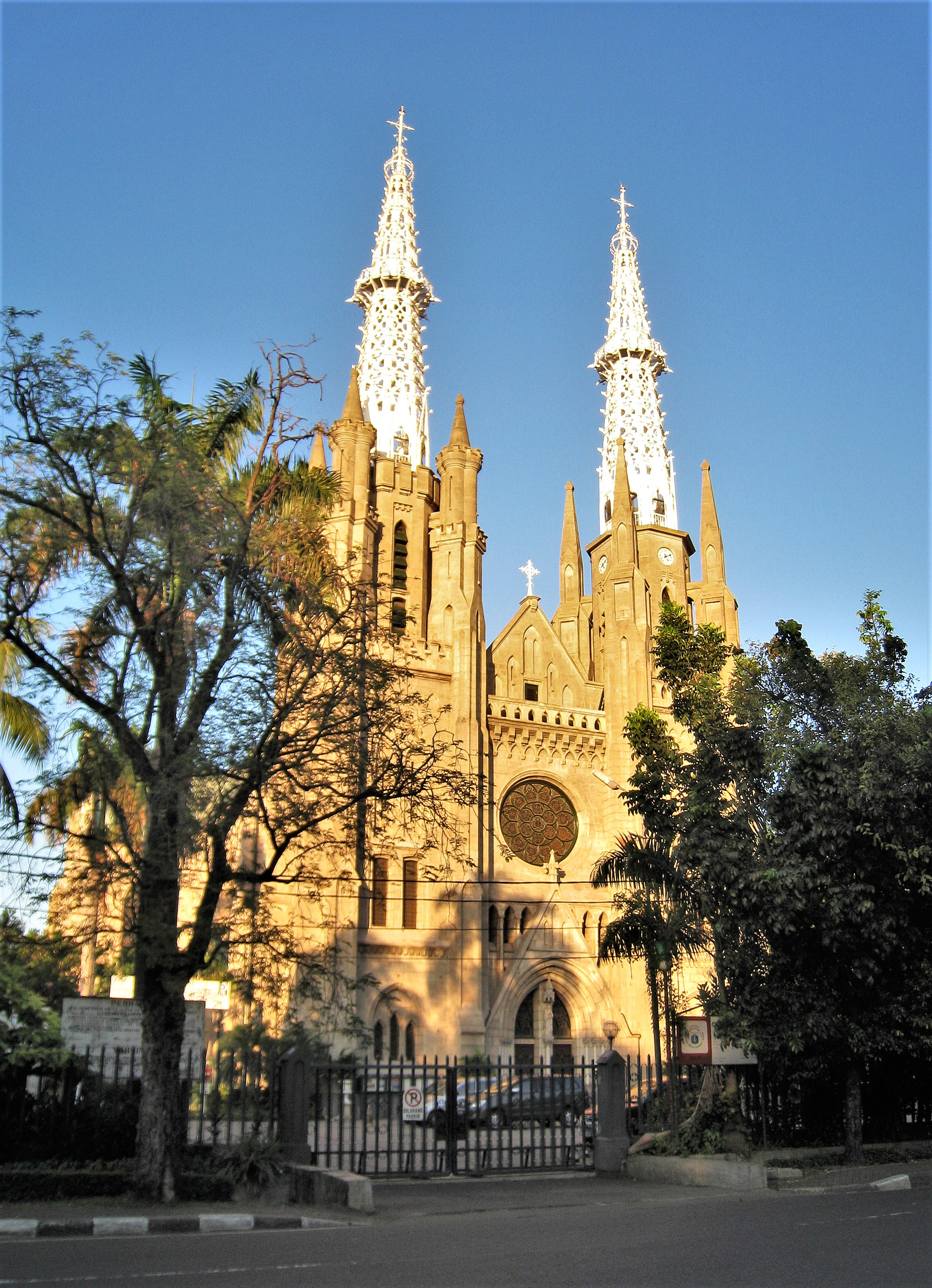
Cathedral of our Lady Assumption in Jakarta

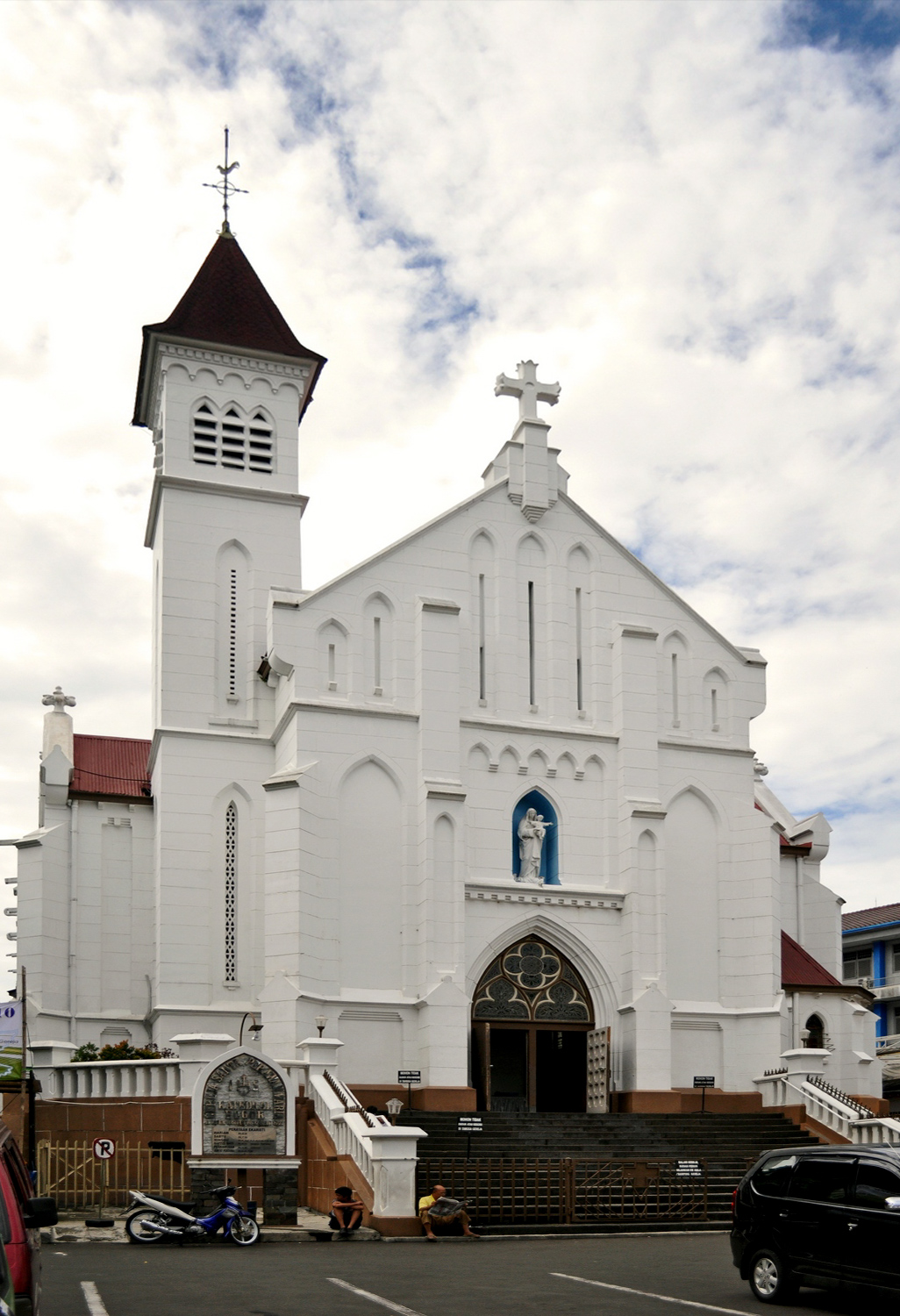
St Mary the Virgin Cathedral in Bogor

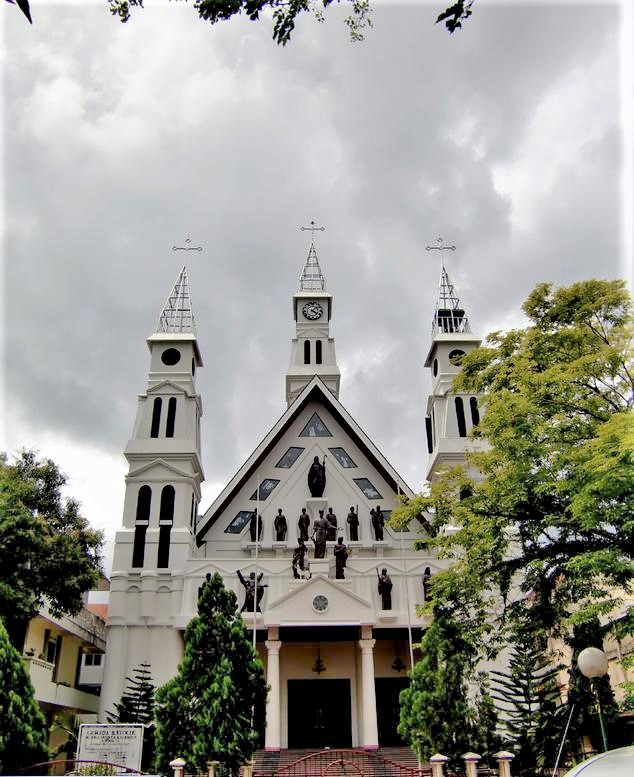
Cathedral of St. Francis Xavier of the Diocese of Amboina

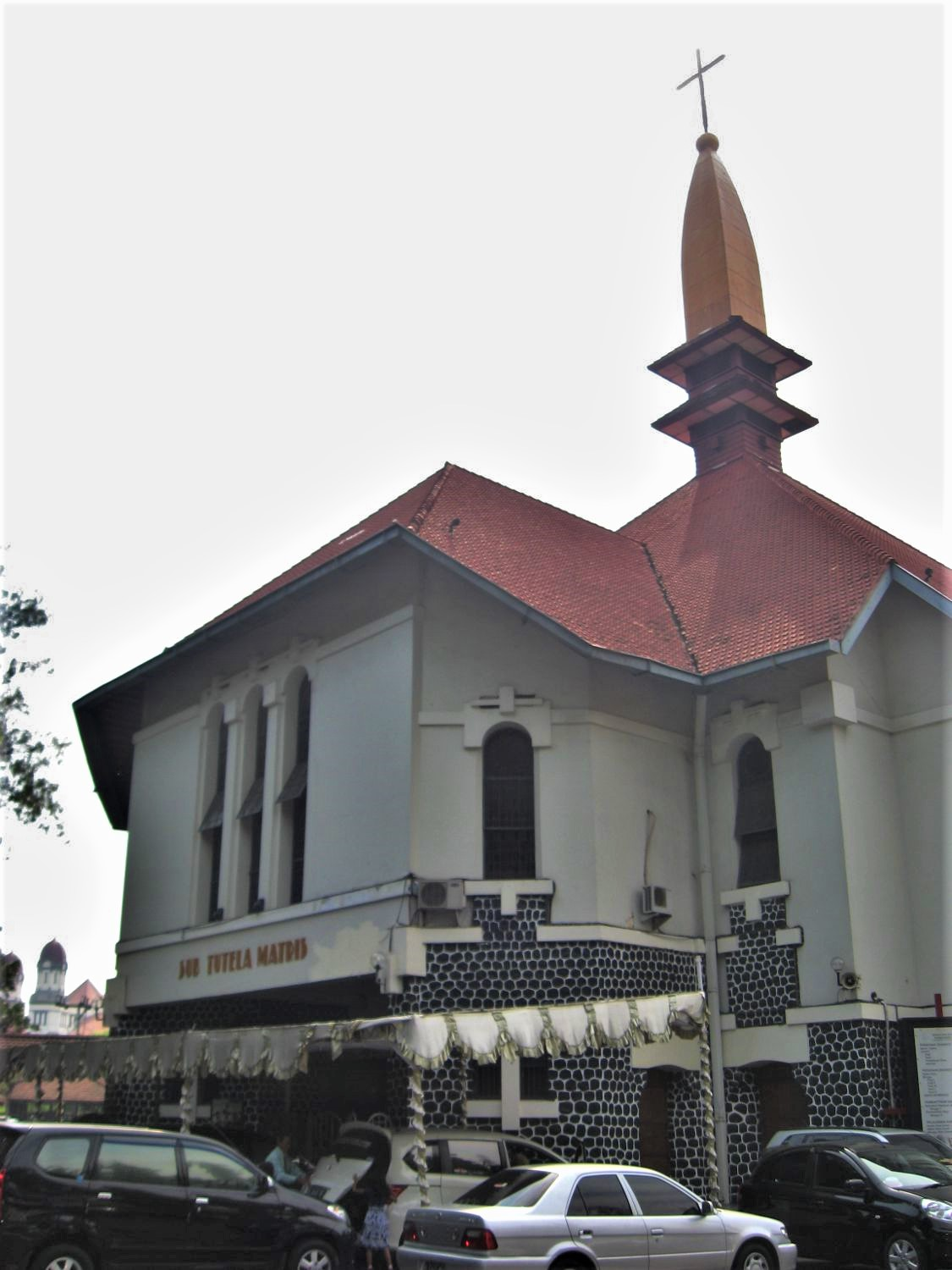
Holy Rosary Cathedral in Semarang

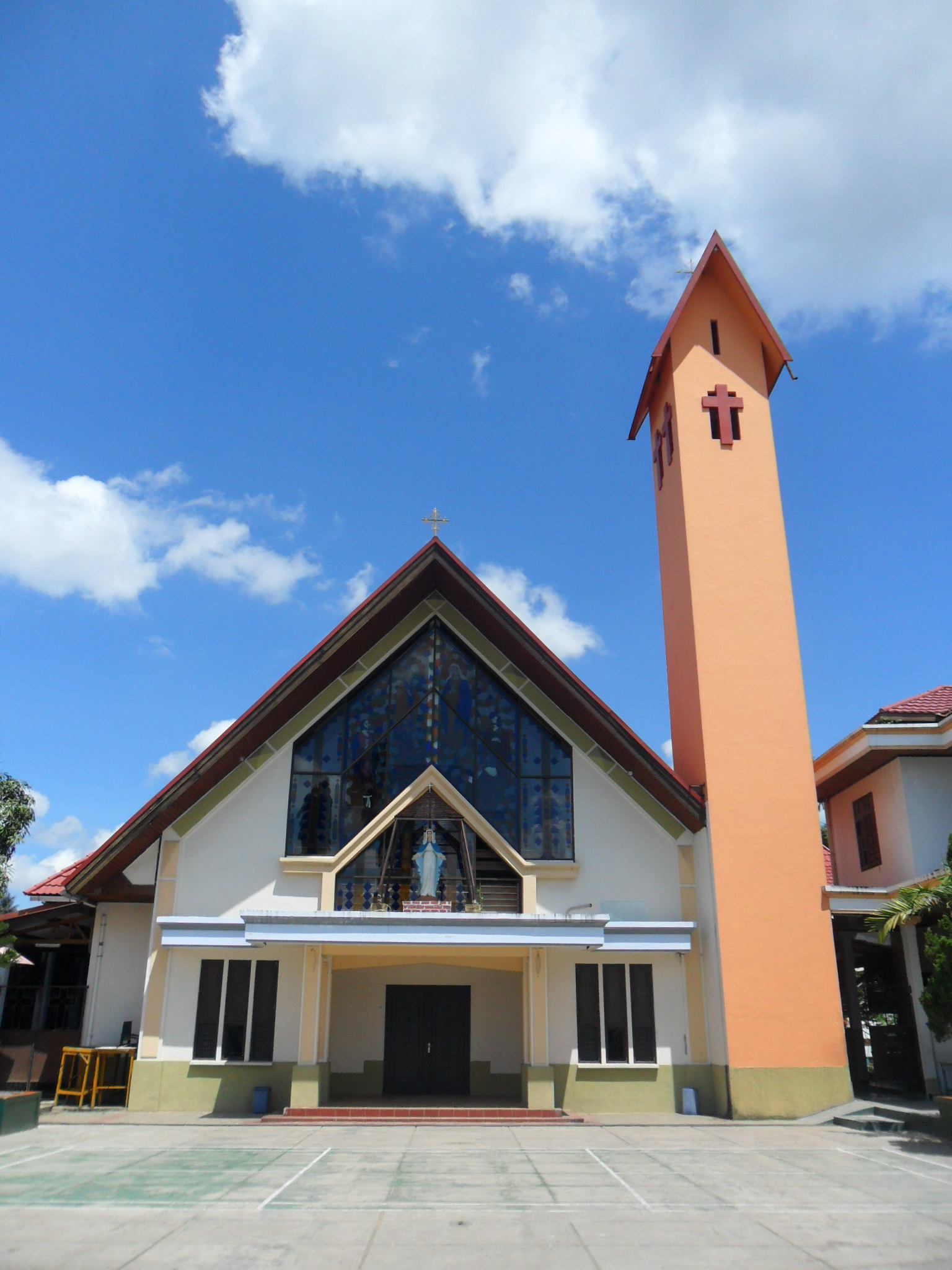
Cathedral of St. Mary, Samarinda

This is the list of cathedrals in Indonesia.

== Roman Catholic ==
Cathedrals of the Roman Catholic Church in Indonesia:

=== Ecclesiastical Province of Ende ===
- Christ the King Cathedral of the Archdiocese of Ende
- Holy Spirit Cathedral of the Diocese of Denpasar
- Cathedral of the Queen of the Rosary of the Diocese of Larantuka
- Cathedral of St. Joseph of the Diocese of Maumere
- Cathedral of St. Joseph and St. Mary of the Assumption of the Diocese of Ruteng

=== Ecclesiastical Province of Jakarta ===
- Cathedral of St. Mary of the Assumption of the Archdiocese of Jakarta
- St. Peter’s Cathedral of the Diocese of Bandung
- Cathedral of the Blessed Virgin Mary of the Diocese of Bogor

=== Ecclesiastical Province of Kupang ===
- Christ the King Cathedral of the Archdiocese of Kupang
- Cathedral of St. Mary Immaculate of the Diocese of Atambua
- Holy Spirit Cathedral of the Diocese of Weetebula

=== Ecclesiastical Province of Makassar ===
- Cathedral of the Sacred Heart of Jesus of the Archdiocese of Makassar
- Cathedral of St. Francis Xavier of the Diocese of Amboina
- Cathedral of the Most Sacred Heart of Mary of the Diocese of Manado

=== Ecclesiastical Province of Medan ===
- Cathedral of St. Mary of the Archdiocese of Medan
- Cathedral of St. Theresia of the Diocese of Padang
- Cathedral of St. Therese of the Diocese of Sibolga

=== Ecclesiastical Province of Merauke ===
- Cathedral of St. Francis Xavier of the Archdiocese of Merauke
- Cathedral of the Holy Cross of the Diocese of Agats
- Christ the King Cathedral of the Diocese of Jayapura
- Cathedral of St. Augustine of the Diocese of Manokwari-Sorong
- Cathedral of the Three Kings of the Diocese of Timika

=== Ecclesiastical Province of Palembang ===
- Cathedral of St. Mary of the Archdiocese of Palembang
- Cathedral of St. Joseph of the Diocese of Pangkal-Pinang
- Cathedral of Christ the King of the Diocese of Tanjungkarang

=== Ecclesiastical Province of Pontianak ===
- Cathedral of St. Joseph of the Archdiocese of Pontianak
- Cathedral of St. Gemma Galgani of the Diocese of Ketapang
- Cathedral of the Sacred Heart of Jesus of the Diocese of Sanggau
- Cathedral of Christ the King of the Diocese of Sintang

=== Ecclesiastical Province of Samarinda ===
- Cathedral of St. Mary of the Archdiocese of Samarinda
- Cathedral of the Holy Family of the Diocese of Banjarmasin
- Cathedral of St. Mary of the Diocese of Palangkaraya
- Cathedral of Our Lady of the Assumption of the Diocese of Tanjung Selor

=== Ecclesiastical Province of Semarang ===
- Cathedral of Mary Queen of the Holy Rosary of the Archdiocese of Semarang
- Cathedral of Our Lady of Mount Carmel of the Diocese of Malang
- Christ the King Cathedral of the Diocese of Purwokerto
- Cathedral of the Sacred Heart of Jesus of the Diocese of Surabaya

== See also ==
- List of cathedrals
- List of church buildings in Indonesia
- Christianity in Indonesia
