= College Le Cocq d'Armandville =

Le Cocq d'Armandville College

Location
- Bukit Meriam; Nabire, Central Papua; Indonesia; 3.3738°S 135.5022°E

Information
- Type: Private secondary school
- Religious affiliation: Catholicism
- Denomination: Jesuit
- Established: 1987; 39 years ago
- Principal: Vincent Seno Hari Prakoso, S.J.
- Grades: X-XII
- Gender: Co-educational
- Colors: Crimson and yellow
- Mascot: Rooster

College Le Cocq d'Armandville is a private Catholic secondary school, located in Nabire, Central Papua, Indonesia. The co-educational school was founded by the Indonesian Province of the Society of Jesus in 1987. The school is the only Jesuit college in Indonesia outside the island of Java.

Asked by the Diocese of Jayapura in 2000 to manage Adhi Luhur High School, also founded in 1987, the Jesuits commenced management of this school.

== See also ==
- Catholic Church in Indonesia
- Education in Indonesia
- List of Jesuit schools
