= Bernardus Bofitwos Baru =

Indonesian Catholic bishop and prelate (born 1969)

The Most Reverend Bernardus Bofitwos Baru OSA
- Bishop of Timika
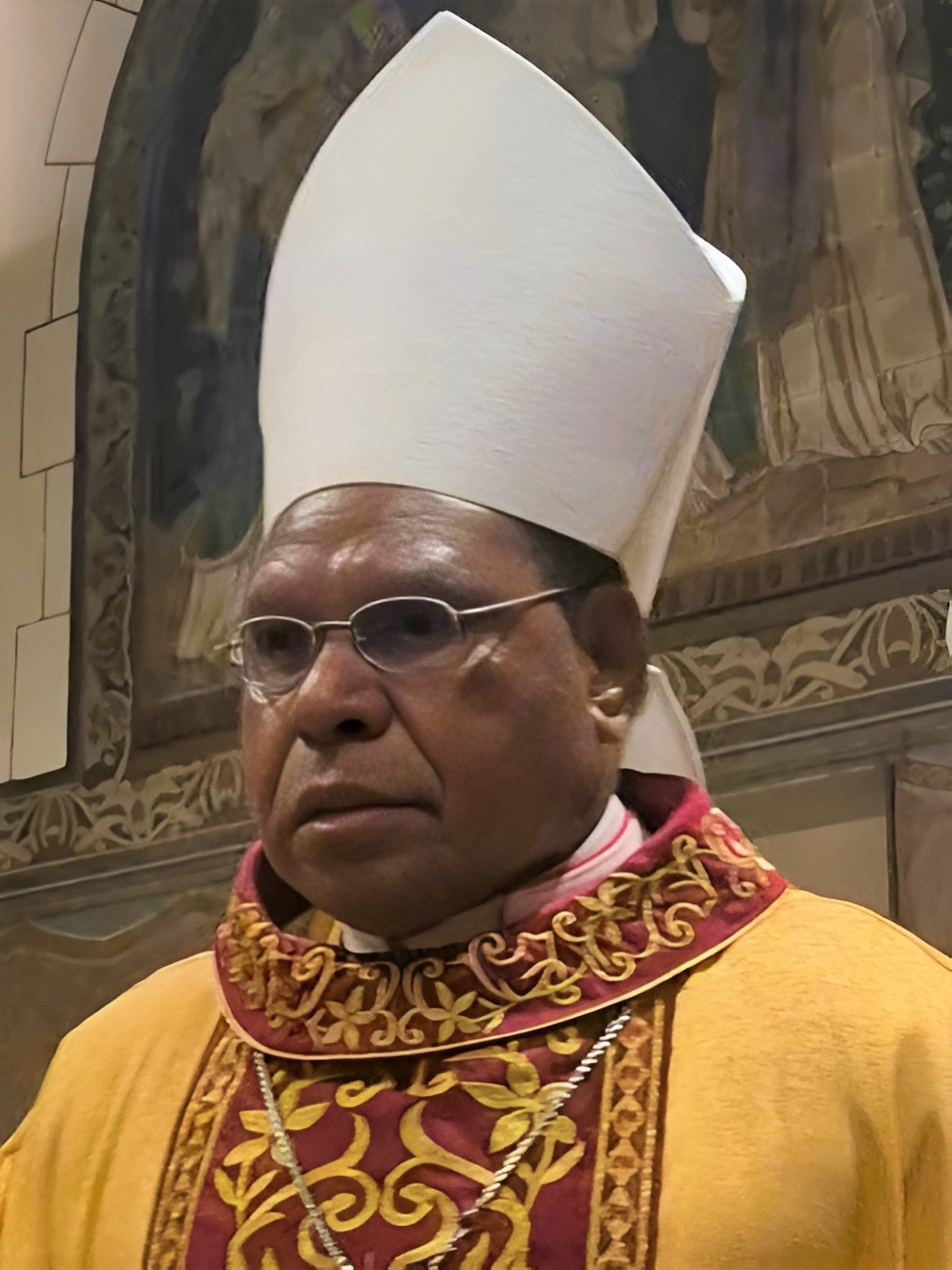
- Appointed: 08 March 2025
- Predecessor: John Philip Saklil
- Successor: Incumbent

Orders
- Ordination: 30 July 2006
- Consecration: 14 May 2025 by Piero Pioppo

Personal details
- Born: 22 August 1969 (age 57) Timika, Central Papua, Indonesia
- Denomination: Roman Catholic
- Education: Pontifical Urban University
- Motto: Ego Sum Ostium (John 10:9)
- Coat of arms

Bernardus Bofitwos Baru (born 22 August 1969) is an Indonesian Catholic prelate and missiologist. On 8 March 2025, he was appointed as the bishop of Roman Catholic Diocese of Timika, succeeding John Phillip Saklil.

== Early life ==
He was born on 22 August 1969 in Timika, Central Papua, Indonesia. He has acquired the doctoral degree in missiology from Pontifical Urban University, Rome. His Parents was Aveetaya Amos Bharoe dan Bohoato Salomina Bame. He spent his childhood in the Central Papua and his youth in West Papua.

== Priesthood ==
He has served in several pastoral and administrative roles in his diocese before becoming a bishop.

== Episcopate ==
He was appointed bishop of Timika, Central Papua, Indonesia, on 8 March 2025 by Pope Francis. His consecration as a bishop held on 14 May 2025.

Catholic Church titles
Preceded by John Philip Saklil	Bishop of Timika; 2025–present	Incumbent
