= Diocese of Palangkaraya =

Roman Catholic diocese in Kalimantan, Indonesia

Diocese of Palangkaraya Diœcesis Palangkaraiensis Keuskupan Palangkaraya

Location
- Country: Indonesia
- Ecclesiastical province: Samarinda
- Metropolitan: Samarinda

Statistics
- Area: 153,564 km^{2} (59,291 sq mi)
- Population: Total; Catholics: (as of 2004); 2,332,864; 53,585 (2.3%)

Information
- Rite: Latin Rite
- Cathedral: Cathedral of St Mary in Palangkaraya

Current leadership
- Pope: Leo XIV
- Bishop: Aloysius Maryadi Sutrisnaatmaka, M.S.F.
- Metropolitan Archbishop: Yustinus Harjosusanto

Website
- kepraya.org

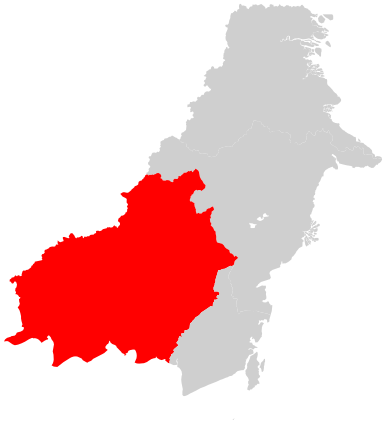
Location of the Diocese of Palangkaraya in the Ecclesiastical Province of Samarinda, Indonesia.

The Roman Catholic Diocese of Palangkaraya (Latin: Palangkaraien(sis)) is a diocese located in the city of Palangkaraya in the ecclesiastical province of Samarinda in Indonesia.

== History ==
- April 5, 1993: Established as the Diocese of Palangkaraya from the Diocese of Banjarmasin

== Leadership ==
- Bishops of Palangkaraya (Roman rite)
  - Bishop Aloysius Maryadi Sutrisnaatmaka, M.S.F. (January 23, 2001 – present)
  - Bishop Yulius Aloysius Husin, M.S.F. (April 5, 1993 – October 13, 1994)
