= Diocese of Timika =

Roman Catholic diocese on Papua, Indonesia

Coordinates: 4°33′S 136°53′E

Diocese of Timika Dioecesis Timikaënsis Keuskupan Timika
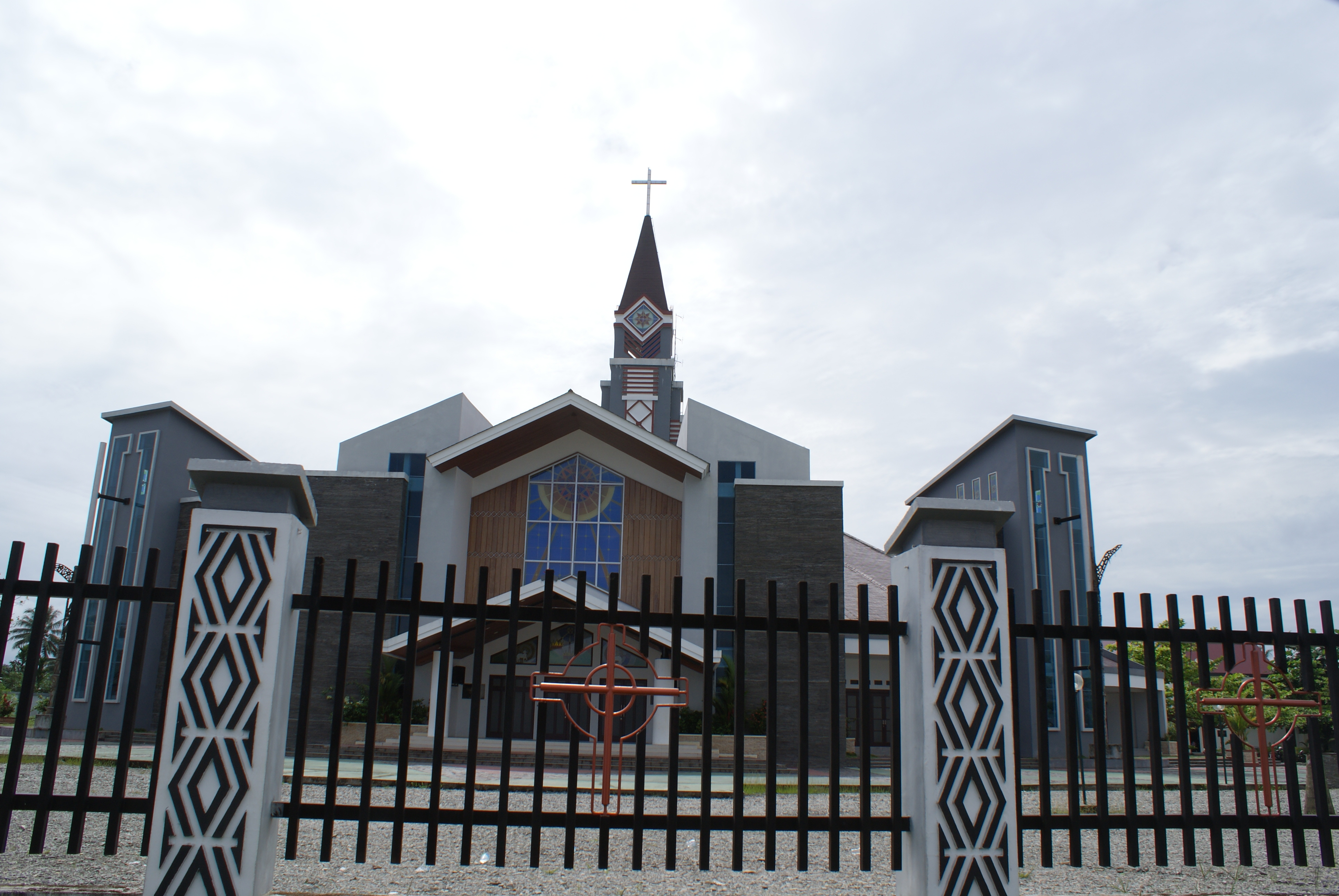
- Three Kings Cathedral in 2011

Location
- Country: Indonesia
- Ecclesiastical province: Merauke
- Metropolitan: Merauke

Statistics
- Area: 81,810 km^{2} (31,590 sq mi)
- Population: Total; Catholics: (as of 2010); 537,000; 90,144 (16.8%)

Information
- Denomination: Roman Catholic
- Rite: Latin Rite
- Established: 19 December 2003
- Cathedral: Three Kings Cathedral, Timika

Current leadership
- Pope: Leo XIV
- Bishop: Most Rev. Mons. Dr. Bernardine Bhophitevossche Bharoe, O.S.A.

Map

Website
- https://keuskupantimika.org

The Roman Catholic Diocese of Timika (Latin: Timikaën(sis)) is a diocese located in Central Papua, Indonesia under the jurisdiction of the ecclesiastical province of Merauke.The diocese encompass all regencies in Central Papua and the regency of Biak Numfor, Waropen, Yapen Islands, and Supiori in the Province of Papua. It is divided into 6 deaneries – Mimika Agimuga, Moni Puncak Jaya, Paniai, Kamuu Mapia, Teluk Cendrawasih, and Tigi. The Cathedral is located in Timika, the capital of Mimika regency.

== History ==
- December 19, 2003: Established as Diocese of Timika from the Diocese of Jayapura

== Leadership ==
- Bishops of Timika (Roman rite)
  - Bishop Most Rev. Mons. Dr. Bernardine Bhophitevossche Bharoe, O.S.A. (March 8, 2025 – present)
  - Bishop John Philip Saklil (December 19, 2003 – August 3, 2019)
