= St. Joseph's Cathedral, Pontianak =

St. Joseph's Cathedral
- Katedral Santo Yosef
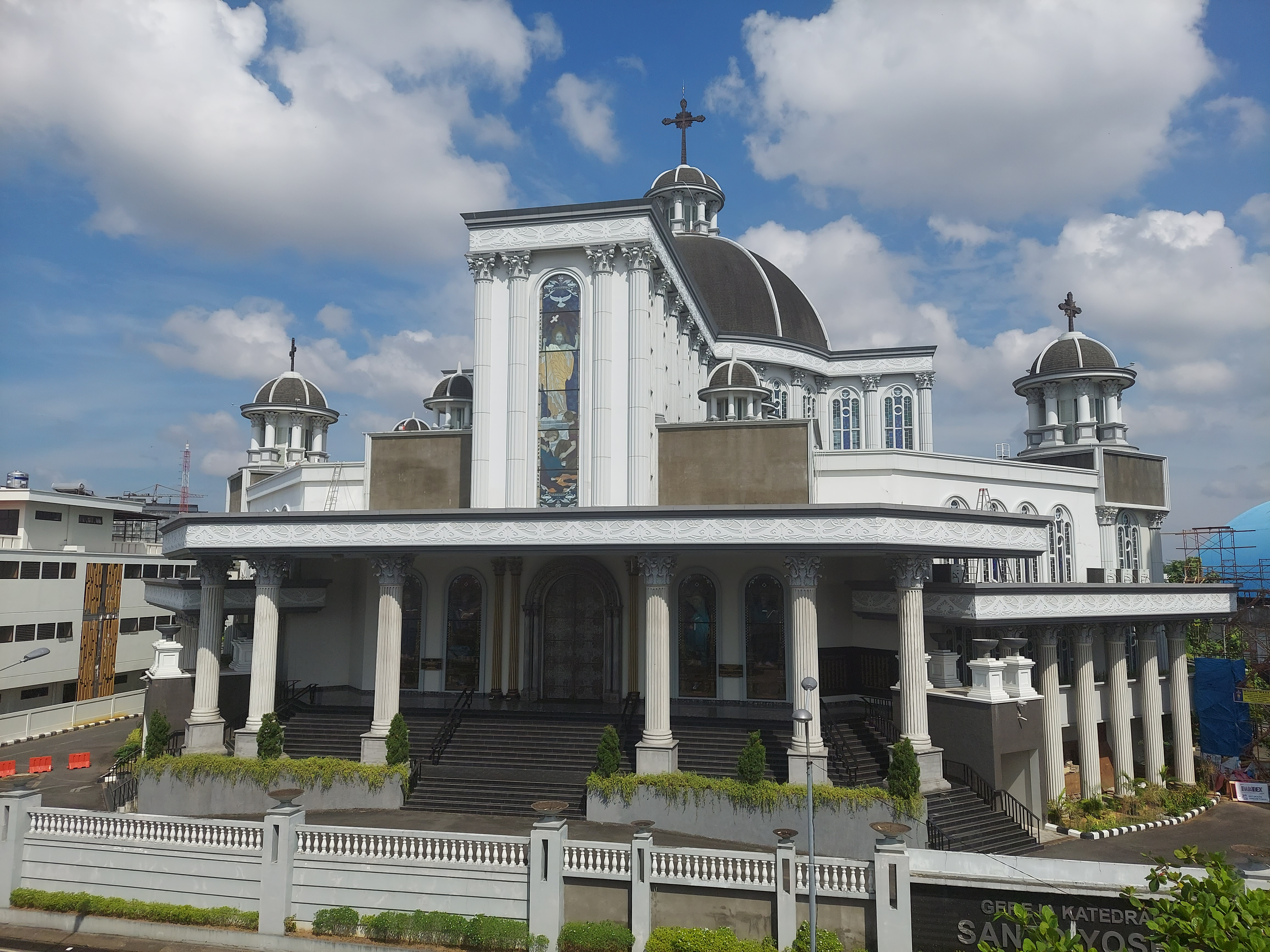
- Exterior of the church
- St. Joseph's Cathedral
- Location: Pontianak
- Country: Indonesia
- Denomination: Roman Catholic Church

Architecture
- Years built: 9 December 1909; 116 years ago

Specifications
- Capacity: 3.000

Administration
- Province: West Kalimantan
- Diocese: Roman Catholic Archdiocese of Pontianak

The Cathedral of Saint Joseph (Indonesian: Katedral Santo Yosef) or simply Pontianak Cathedral is a parish of the Roman Catholic Church in Pontianak, West Kalimantan, Borneo, Indonesia. It is the mother church and seat of the Metropolitan Archdiocese of Pontianak. It is under the pastoral responsibility of Archbishop Agustinus Agus.

An apostolic prefecture for what was then called Dutch Borneo was erected in 1905, and the Capuchins established themselves in Pontianak. The first church in the city was completed in 1908 and consecrated the following year. It was designated

By 2011 the congregation had far outgrown the original structure, which was demolished. The new cathedral church, which opened December 19, 2014, is one of the largest in the region. It was formally dedicated on 19 March 2015, the Feast of Saint Joseph. Throughout its history it has been staffed by priests of the Capuchin Order.

It was elevated to cathedral status on January 3, 1961 with the elevation of Pontianak as an archdiocese (Archidioecesis Pontianakensis or Keuskupan Agung Pontianak) through the bull Quod Christus of Pope John XXIII.

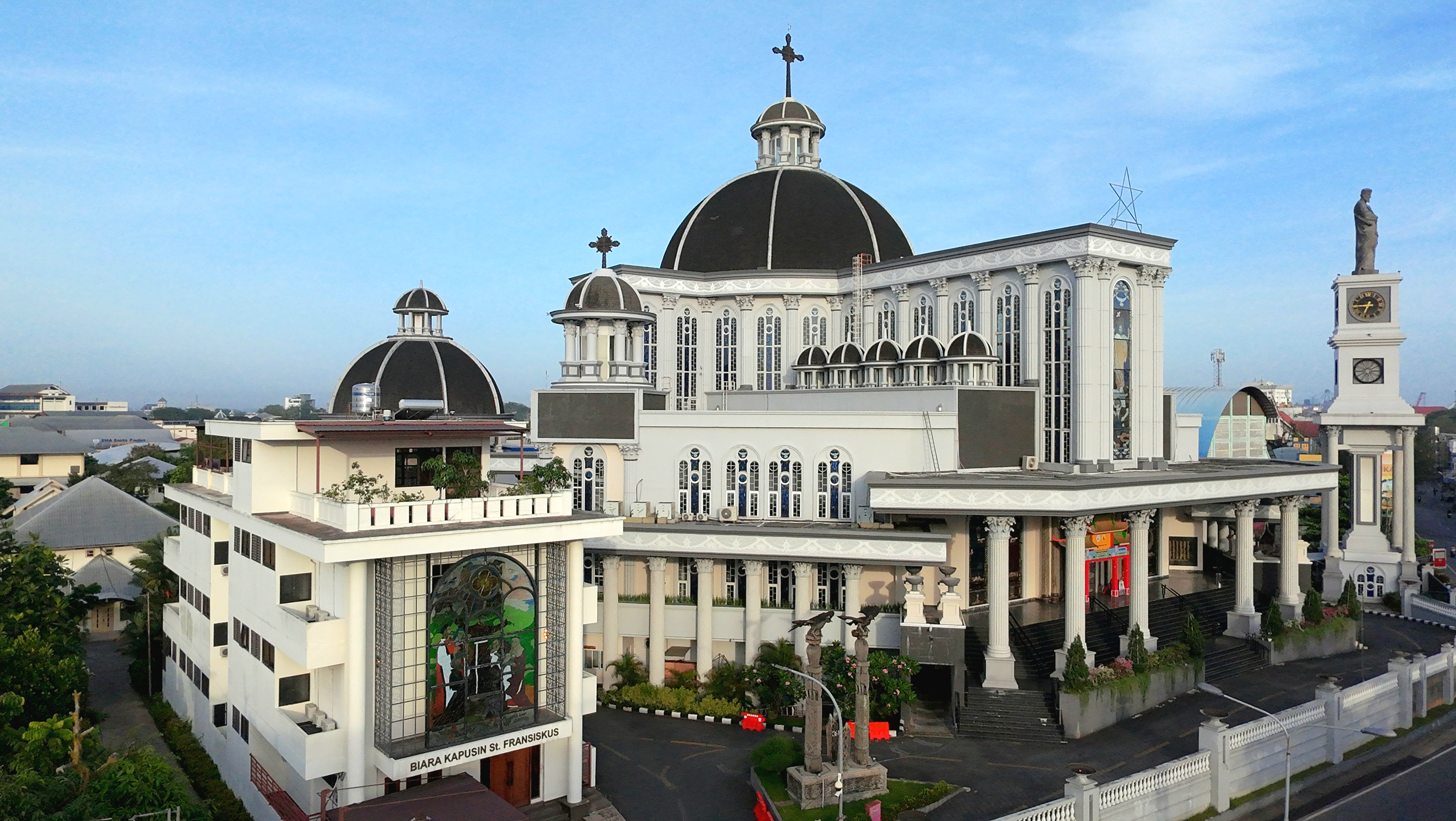
The cathedral in 2026.

== See also ==
- Catholic Church in Indonesia
- List of cathedrals in Indonesia
