= Holy Family Cathedral, Banjarmasin =

Coordinates: 3.3246°S 114.5910°E

Holy Family Cathedral
- Gereja Katedral Keluarga Kudus
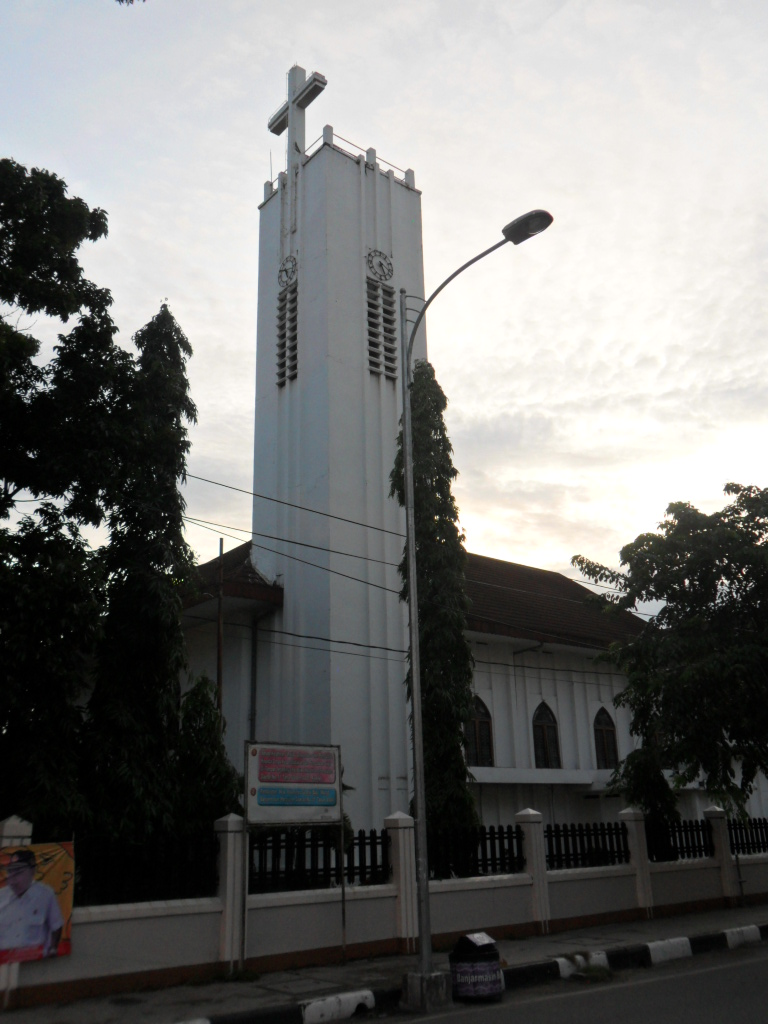
- Holy Family Cathedral
- Location: Banjarmasin
- Country: Indonesia
- Denomination: Roman Catholic Church

The Holy Family Cathedral (Indonesian: Gereja Katedral Keluarga Kudus) is a religious building of the Catholic Church in Banjarmasin in the province of South Kalimantan, Indonesia. It was designed by architect Roestenhurg in a neo-Gothic style.

The cathedral was consecrated June 28, 1931, and follows the Roman or Latin rite. It serves as the cathedral of the Diocese of Banjarmasin (Dioecesis Bangiarmasinus or Keuskupan Banjarmasin), created in 1961 by the bull Quod Christus of Pope John XXIII.

== See also ==
- Holy Family Church (disambiguation)
- List of cathedrals in Indonesia
- Roman Catholicism in Indonesia
