= Franciscus Xaverius Rocharjanta Prajasuta =

Indonesian Roman Catholic bishop

- Bishop emeritus of Diocese of Banjarmasin
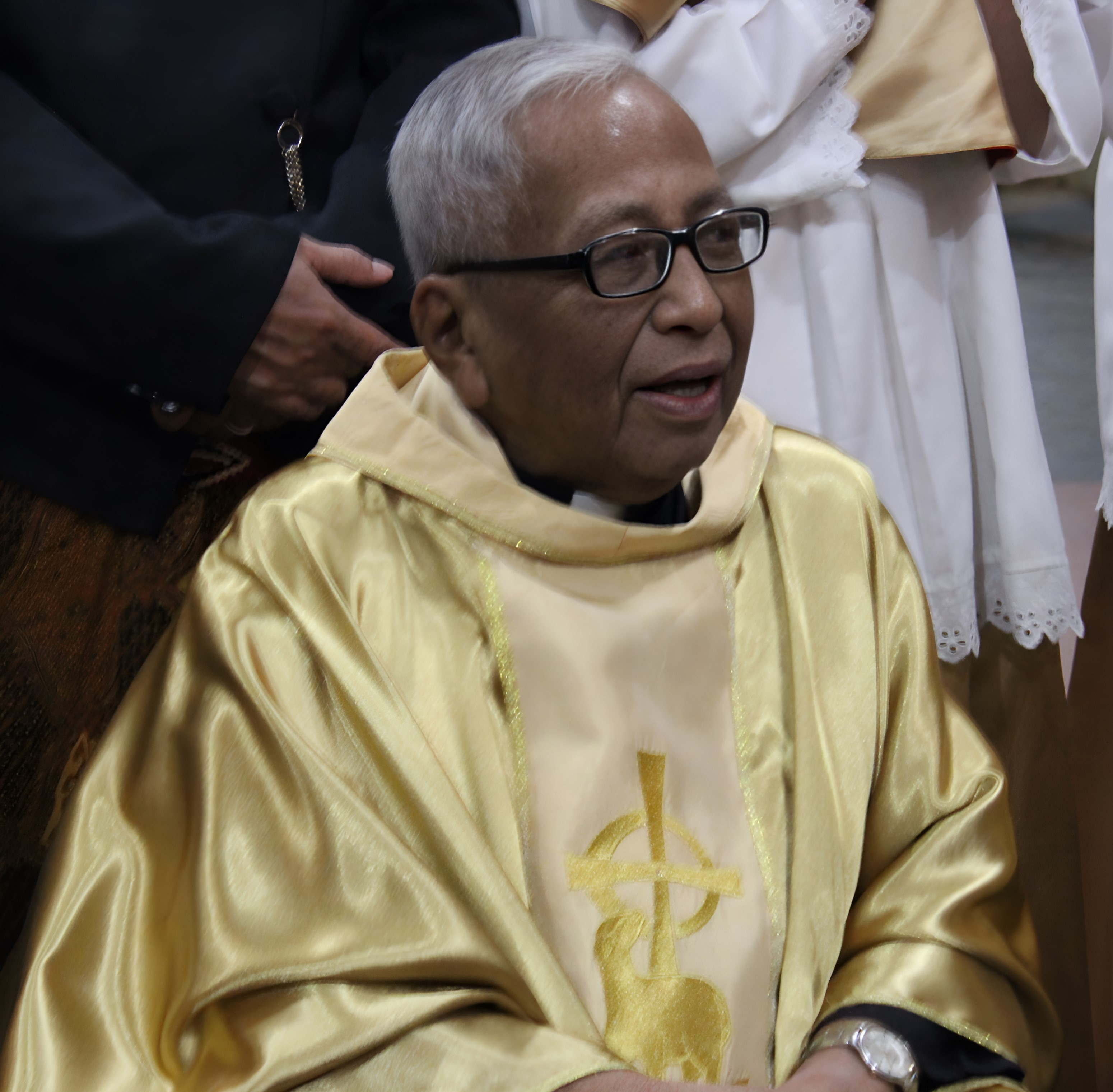
- Church: Roman Catholic Church
- See: Diocese of Banjarmasin
- In office: 1983 - 2008
- Predecessor: Wilhelmus Demarteau, M.S.F.
- Successor: Petrus Boddeng Timang

Orders
- Ordination: 27 January 1941

Personal details
- Born: 3 November 1931; Central Java, Dutch East Indies
- Died: 28 July 2015 (aged 83); Yogyakarta, Indonesia

Franciscus Xaverius Rocharjanta Prajasuta (November 3, 1931 – July 28, 2015) was an Indonesias Roman Catholic bishop and composer. He served as the Bishop of the Roman Catholic Diocese of Banjarmasin in South Kalimantan from 1983 to 2008.

Ordained to the priesthood in 1959, Prajusta was named bishop of the Roman Catholic Diocese of Banjarmasin, Indonesia, in 1983 and retired in 2008.
