= Andreas Peter Cornelius Sol =

Catholic bishop (1915–2016)

His Excellency Andreas Peter Cornelius Sol M.S.C.
- Bishop Emeritus of Amboina
- Church: Roman Catholic
- See: Amboina
- In office: 1965–1994
- Predecessor: Jacques Grent
- Successor: Petrus Canisius Mandagi
- Previous post: Coadjutor Bishop of Amboina (1963-1965)

Orders
- Ordination: 10 August 1940
- Consecration: 25 February 1964 by Jacques Grent
- Rank: Bishop

Personal details
- Born: 19 October 1915 Sloten, Amsterdam, Netherlands
- Died: 26 March 2016 (aged 100)

Andreas Peter Cornelius Sol, M.S.C. (19 October 1915 – 26 March 2016) was a Dutch prelate of the Roman Catholic Church. At the age of 100, he was one of the oldest Catholic bishops. Until his death, he lived in Ambon, Maluku, on one of the Moluccan islands in Indonesia.

Sol was born in Sloten, what used to be a farming village close to Amsterdam, the Netherlands, and ordained a priest on 10 August 1940 from the Roman Catholic order Missionaries of the Sacred Heart of Jesus. Andreas was appointed to the Amboina Diocese in Indonesia on 10 December 1963, and succeeded then-bishop Jacques Grent as Bishop of the diocese on 15 January 1965. He remained bishop of the Roman Catholic Diocese of Amboina until his retirement on 10 June 1994. He consecrated his successor P.C. Mandagi MSC. Sol was Titular bishop of Regiana from 1963 to 1965.
