= Herman Ferdinandus Maria Münninghoff =

Dutch Roman Catholic bishop (1921–2018)

His Excellency Herman Ferdinandus Maria Münninghoff O.F.M.
- Bishop Emeritus of Jayapura
- Church: Roman Catholic Church
- See: Diocese of Jayapura
- Appointed: 6 May 1972
- Term ended: 29 August 1997
- Predecessor: Rudolf Joseph Manfred Staverman, O.F.M.
- Successor: Leo Laba Ladjar, O.F.M.

Orders
- Ordination: 15 March 1953
- Consecration: 10 September 1972 by Justinus Darmojuwono

Personal details
- Born: 30 November 1921 Woerden, Netherlands
- Died: 7 February 2018 (aged 96) Wijchen, Netherlands

Herman Ferdinandus Maria Münninghoff (30 November 1921 – 7 February 2018) was a Dutch prelate of the Roman Catholic Church. He was the oldest Dutch Roman Catholic bishop.

Münninghoff was born in Woerden, Netherlands and was ordained a priest on 15 March 1953 from the Order of Friars Minor. Münninghoff was appointed bishop of the Diocese of Djajapura on 6 May 1972 and was ordained bishop on 10 September 1972 to the newly renamed Diocese of Jayapura. Münninghoff served until his retirement on 29 August 1997.
