= Diocese of Sanggau =

Roman Catholic diocese in West Kalimantan, Indonesia

Diocese of Sanggau Dioecesis Sanggauensis Keuskupan Sanggau

Location
- Country: Indonesia
- Ecclesiastical province: Pontianak
- Metropolitan: Pontianak

Statistics
- Area: 18,302 km^{2} (7,066 sq mi)
- Population: Total; Catholics: (as of 2024); 519,958; 368,170 (60.7%)

Information
- Rite: Latin Rite
- Cathedral: Cathedral of the Sacred Heart of Jesus in Sanggau Regency

Current leadership
- Pope: Leo XIV
- Bishop: Valentinus Saeng, C.P.
- Metropolitan Archbishop: sede vacante
- Bishops emeritus: Domenico Luca Spinosi; Giulio Mencuccini, C.P.

The Roman Catholic Diocese of Sanggau (Latin: Sanggauen(sis)) is a diocese located in the city of Sanggau in the ecclesiastical province of Pontianak in Indonesia.

== History ==
- 9 April 1968: Established as the Apostolic Prefecture of Sekadau from the Metropolitan Archdiocese of Pontianak and Diocese of Ketapang
- 8 June 1982: Promoted as Diocese of Sanggau

== Leadership ==
- Bishops of Sanggau (Roman rite)
  - Bishop Valentinus Saeng, C.P. (18 June 2022 – present)
  - Bishop Giulio Mencuccini, C.P. (22 January 1990 – 18 June 2022)
- Prefects Apostolic of Sekadau (Roman Rite)
  - Fr. Domenico Luca Spinosi, C.P. (1 September 1972 – 1982)
  - Fr. Michael Di Simone, C.P. (31 July 1968 – 1972)
