= John Philip Saklil =

Indonesian Catholic bishop

- Bishop of the Diocese of Timika
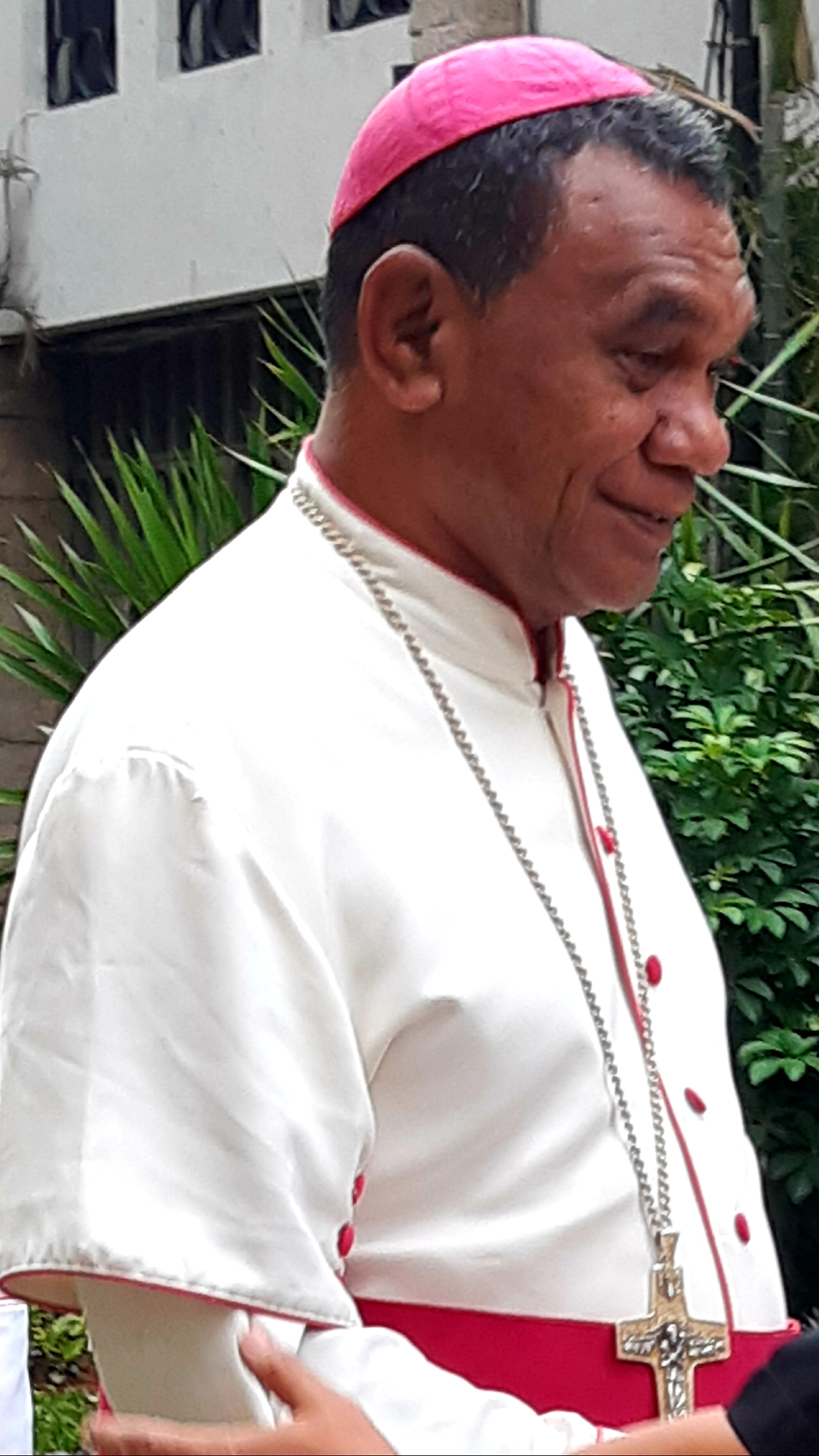
- Saklil in 2018
- Church: Roman Catholic Church
- See: Diocese of Timika
- In office: 2004–2019
- Previous post: Priest

Orders
- Ordination: 23 October 1988
- Consecration: 18 April 2004 by Leo Laba Ladjar
- Rank: Bishop

Personal details
- Born: 20 March 1960 Kokonao, Netherlands New Guinea
- Died: 3 August 2019 (aged 59) Timika, Papua

John Philip Saklil (20 March 1960 – 3 August 2019) was an Indonesian prelate of the Catholic Church who was Bishop of Timika from 2004 until his death in 2019.

Saklil was born in Kokonao, Netherlands New Guinea to Moluccan transmigrant parents from the Kei Islands on 20 March 1960. He studied in Indonesia and the Philippines before being ordained a priest of the Diocese of Jayapura on 23 October 1988. He fulfilled pastoral assignments until 1993 and then studied for three years at the East Asian Pastoral Institute in Manila. Returning to Jayapura, he was vicar general from 1996 to 1999 and then episcopal vicar for the western part of the diocese, based in Timika, from 2000 to 2004.

On 10 January 2004, Pope John Paul II appointed him the first Bishop of newly established Diocese of Timika. He received his episcopal consecration on 18 April.

He died on 3 August 2019.
