= Hieronymus Herculanus Bumbun =

Indonesian Roman Catholic archbishop (1937–2024)

His Excellency, The Most Reverend Hieronymus Herculanus Bumbun OFM Cap
- Archbishop Emeritus of Pontianak
- Appointed: 26 February 1977
- Term ended: 3 June 2014
- Predecessor: Herculanus Joannes Maria van der Burgt
- Successor: Agustinus Agus
- Previous post: Auxiliary Bishop of Pontianak (1975‍–‍1977)

Orders
- Ordination: 27 July 1967 by Herculanus Joannes Maria van der Burgt
- Consecration: 27 May 1976 by Justinus Darmojuwono

Personal details
- Born: 5 August 1937 Menawai, Dutch East Indies
- Died: 30 September 2024 (aged 87) Pontianak, Indonesia
- Motto: Amor non Amatur (Latin for 'Love is not loved')

Hieronymus Herculanus Bumbun OFM Cap (5 August 1937 – 30 September 2024) was an Indonesian Catholic prelate who served as Archbishop of Pontianak from 1977 until his retirement in 2014. Before this, he served as Auxiliary Bishop of Pontianak from 1975 to 1977. He died on 30 September 2024 at the age of 87.

Catholic Church titles
| Preceded by Herculanus Joannes Maria van der Burgt | Archbishop of Pontianak; 1977–2014 | Succeeded by Agustinus Agus |
| Preceded by José Floriberto Cornelis | Titular Bishop of Capra; 1975–1977 | Succeeded by Anatole Milandou |
