= St. Mary Assumpta Cathedral, Tanjung Selor =

St. Mary Assumpta Cathedral
- Katedral St. Maria Assumpta
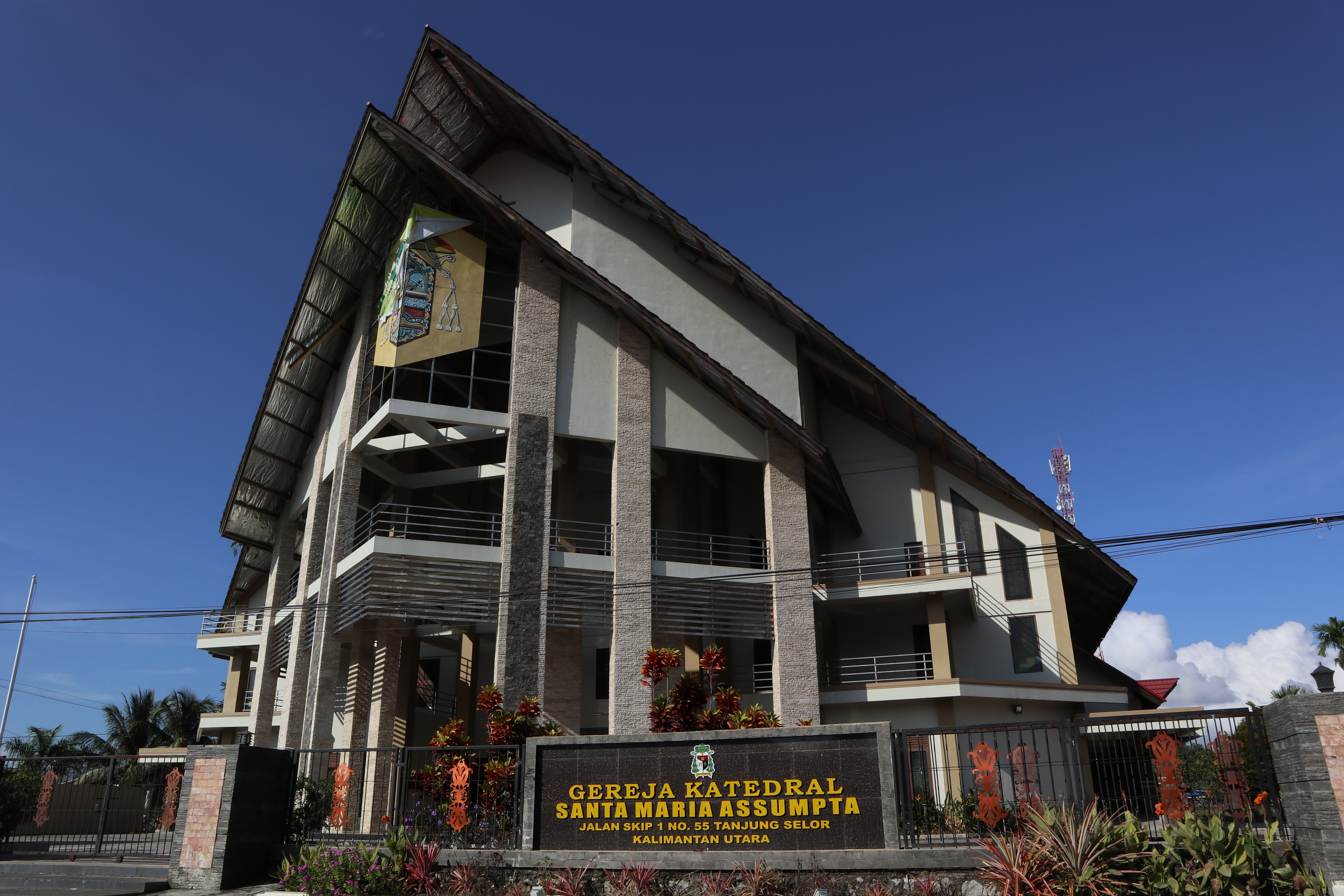
- St. Mary Assumpta Cathedral
- Location: Tanjung Selor
- Country: Indonesia
- Denomination: Catholic Church

Administration
- Diocese: Tanjung Selor

St. Mary Assumpta Cathedral (Indonesian: Katedral St. Maria Assumpta), also known simply as Tanjung Selor Cathedral, is the cathedral of the Roman Catholic Diocese of Tanjung Selor in Tanjung Selor, Bulungan, Kalimantan, on the island of Borneo in Indonesia.

The parish was created in 1996, and elevated to cathedral with the erection of the diocese in 2001 via the bull Ad aptius Consulendum of Pope John Paul II. The church, dedicated to the Assumption of the Virgin Mary, was blessed by the representative of the Holy See, the apostolic nuncio Monsignor Antonio Guido Filipazzi, on February 5, 2012.

== See also ==
- List of cathedrals in Indonesia
- Catholic Church in Indonesia
