= Diocese of Banjarmasin =

Roman Catholic diocese in South Kalimantan, Indonesia

Coordinates: 3.3244°S 114.5900°E

Diocese of Banjarmasin Dioecesis Bangiarmasina Keuskupan Banjarmasin
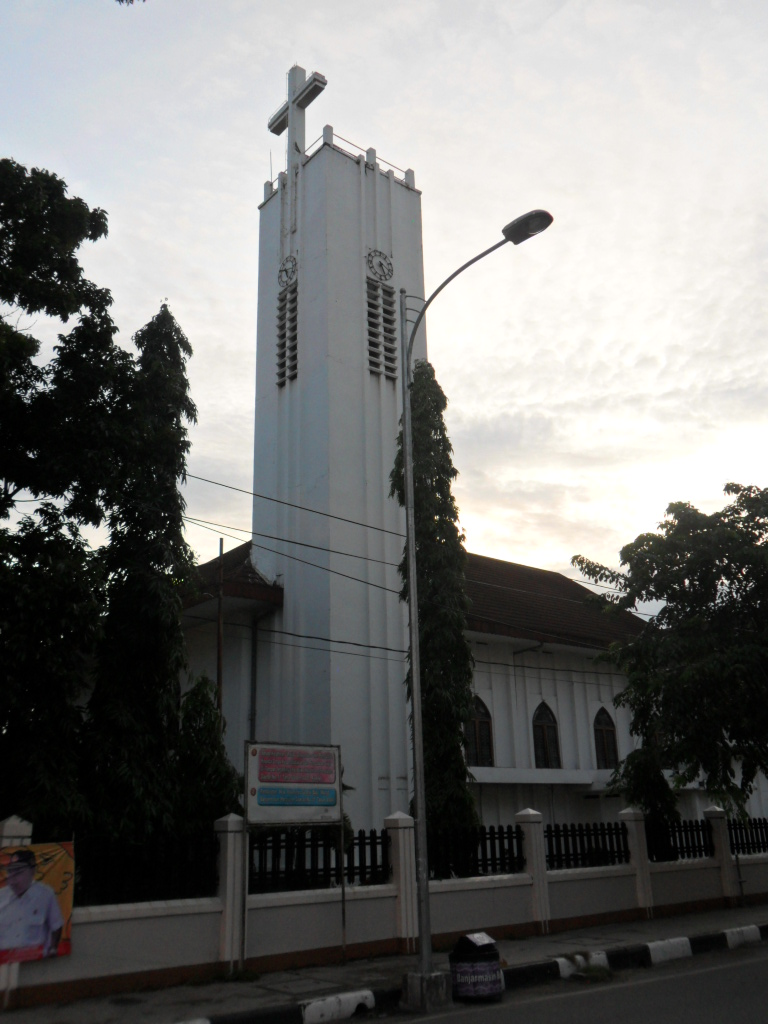
- Banjarmasin Cathedral Church

Location
- Country: Indonesia
- Ecclesiastical province: Samarinda
- Metropolitan: Samarinda

Statistics
- Area: 37,530 km^{2} (14,490 sq mi)
- Population: Total; Catholics: (as of 2012); 3,680,000; 17,051 (0.5%)
- Parishes: 9

Information
- Rite: Latin Rite
- Cathedral: Holy Family Cathedral, Banjarmasin

Current leadership
- Pope: Leo XIV
- Bishop: Victorius Dwiardy, OFMCap
- Metropolitan Archbishop: Yustinus Harjosusanto MSF
- Bishops emeritus: Petrus Boddeng Timang

Website
- Blog of the Diocese

The Roman Catholic Diocese of Banjarmasin (Latin: Bangiarmasin(a)) is a diocese located in the city of Banjarmasin in the ecclesiastical province of Samarinda in Indonesia.

== History ==
- May 21, 1938: Established as Apostolic Prefecture of Bandjarmasin from the Apostolic Vicariate of Dutch Borneo
- March 10, 1949: Promoted as Apostolic Vicariate of Bandjarmasin
- January 3, 1961: Promoted as Diocese of Bandjarmasin
- August 22, 1973: Renamed as Diocese of Banjarmasin

== Leadership ==
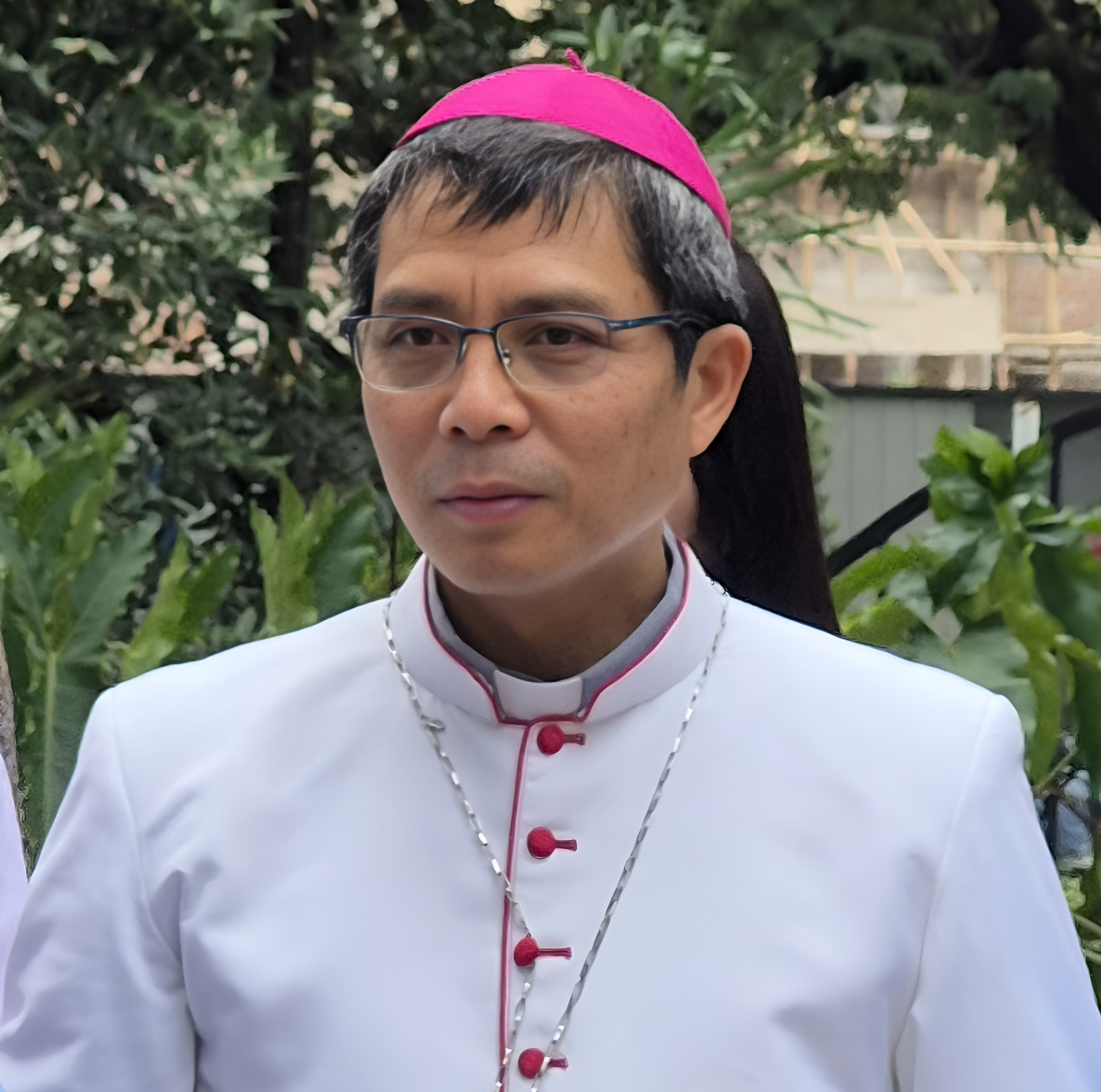
Bishop of Banjarmasin, Victorius Dwiardy

- Bishops of Banjarmasin (Roman rite)
  - Victorius Dwiardy, OFMCap (July 8, 2023 – present)
  - Petrus Boddeng Timang (June 14, 2008 – July 8, 2023)
  - Franciscus Xaverius Rocharjanta Prajasuta, MSF (June 6, 1983 – June 14, 2008)
  - Wilhelmus Demarteau, MSF (January 3, 1961 – June 6, 1983)
- Vicars Apostolic of Bandjarmasin (Roman Rite)
  - Bishop Wilhelmus Demarteau, MSF (January 6, 1954 – January 3, 1961)
  - Bishop Giovanni Groen, MSF (March 10, 1949 – April 18, 1953)
- Prefects Apostolic of Bandjarmasin (Roman Rite)
  - Giacomo Giovanni M. Kusters, MSF (May 21, 1938 – 1949)
