= Wilhelmus Demarteau =

Wilhelmus Demarteau, M.S.F.
- Bishop emeritus of Diocese of Banjarmasin
- Church: Roman Catholic Church
- See: Diocese of Banjarmasin
- In office: 1961 - 1983
- Predecessor: Giovanni Groen
- Successor: Franciscus Xaverius Rocharjanta Prajasuta
- Previous post: Bishop

Orders
- Ordination: 27 January 1941

Personal details
- Born: 24 January 1917 Horn, Netherlands
- Died: 5 December 2012 (aged 95)

Wilhelmus Demarteau, M.S.F. (24 January 1917 – 5 December 2012) was a Dutch prelate of the Roman Catholic Church. He was one of the oldest Roman Catholic bishops and Dutch bishops.

Demarteau was born in Horn, Netherlands and ordained a priest on 27 July 1941 for the Congregation of Missionaries of the Holy Family. Demarteau was appointed Vicar Apostolic of the Diocese of Banjarmasin on 6 January 1954 along with Titular Bishop of Arsinoë in Cypro and was consecrated bishop on 5 May 1954. He was appointed bishop of the Diocese of Banjarmasin and served until his resignation on 6 June 1983. Demarteau died on 5 December 2012 in Suaka Insan Hospital (Rumah Sakit Suaka Insan:Indonesian)

== See also ==
- Diocese of Banjarmasin
