= Archdiocese of Samarinda =

Roman Catholic archdiocese in Kalimantan, Indonesia

Archdiocese of Samarinda Archidioecesis Samarindaënsis Keuskupan Agung Samarinda
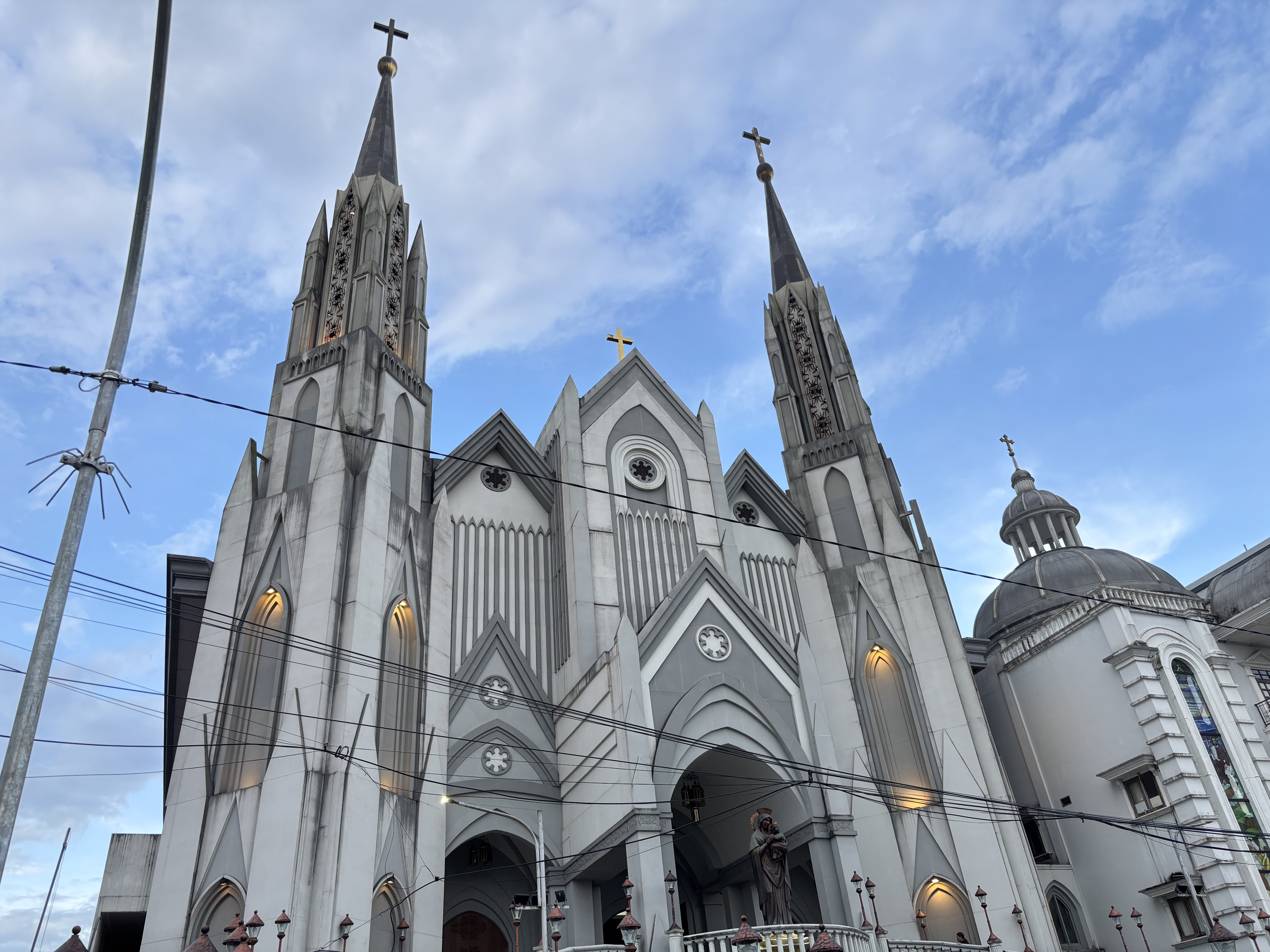
- Samarinda Cathedral

Location
- Country: Indonesia
- Ecclesiastical province: Samarinda

Statistics
- Area: 114,810 km^{2} (44,330 sq mi)
- Population: Total; Catholics: (as of 2010); 2,567,000; 97,171 (3.8%)

Information
- Rite: Latin Rite
- Cathedral: Cathedral of St Mary in Samarinda

Current leadership
- Pope: Leo XIV
- Metropolitan Archbishop: Mgr Yustinus Harjosusanto, MSF

The Roman Catholic Archdiocese of Samarinda (Latin: Samarindaën(sis)) is an archdiocese located in the city of Samarinda in Indonesia.

In addition to the cathedral, St. Mary's in Samarinda, there are two other parishes serving the faithful: St. Luke's in Temindung (Paroki Santo Lukas Temindung) and the Church of the Sacred Heart of Jesus in Seberang (Paroki Hati Kudus Yesus).

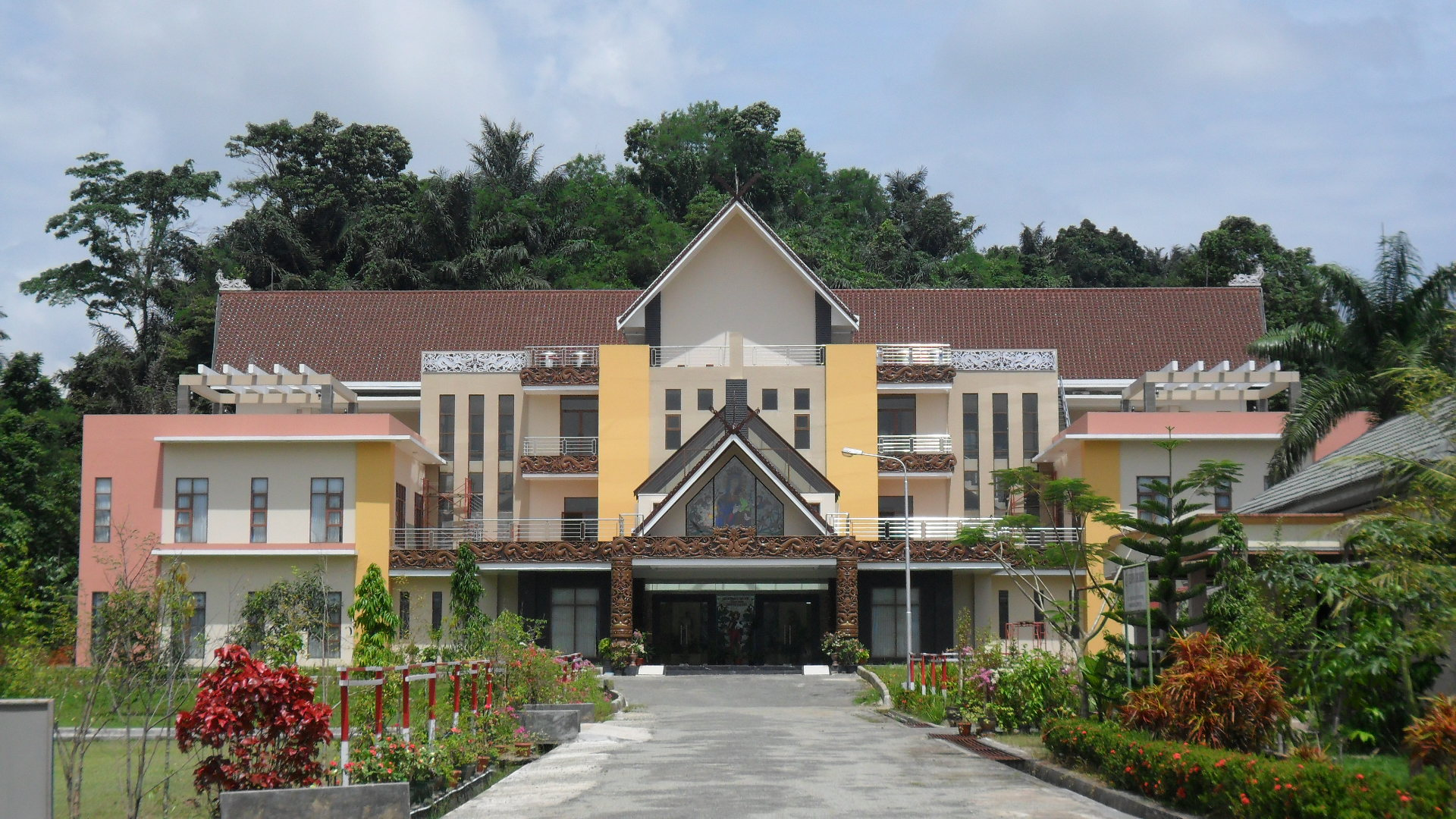
Archdiocese of Samarinda building.

== History ==
- February 21, 1955: Established as Apostolic Vicariate of Samarinda from the Apostolic Vicariate of Bandjarmasin
- January 3, 1961: Promoted as Diocese of Samarinda
- January 29, 2003: Promoted as Metropolitan Archdiocese of Samarinda

== Leadership ==
- Archbishops of Samarinda (Roman rite)
  - Archbishop Yustinus Harjosusanto, M.S.F. (February 15, 2015 – )
  - Archbishop Florentinus Sului Hajang Hau, M.S.F. (January 29, 2003 – July 18, 2013)
- Bishops of Samarinda (Roman Rite)
  - Bishop Florentinus Sului Hajang Hau, M.S.F. (later Archbishop) (April 5, 1993 – January 29, 2003)
  - Bishop Michael Cornelis C. Coomans, M.S.F. (November 30, 1987 – May 6, 1992)
  - Bishop Jacques Henri Romeijn, M.S.F. (January 3, 1961 – February 11, 1975)
- Vicars Apostolic of Samarinda (Roman Rite)
  - Bishop Jacques Henri Romeijn, M.S.F. (July 10, 1955 – January 3, 1961)

== Suffragan dioceses ==
- Banjarmasin
- Palangkaraya
- Tanjung Selor

== Sources ==
- GCatholic.org
- Catholic Hierarchy
