= St. Gemma Galgani Cathedral, Ketapang =

St. Gemma Galgani Cathedral
- Katedral Santa Gemma
- St. Gemma Galgani Cathedral
- 1°50′59″S 109°58′25″E
- Location: Ketapang
- Country: Indonesia
- Denomination: Roman Catholic Church

The Cathedral of St. Gemma Galgani (Indonesian: Katedral Santa Gemma ) is the seat of the Roman Catholic Diocese of Ketapang. Also known as Ketapang Cathedral, it is located just at the mouth of the Pawan River in the city of Ketapang, in the regency of the same name in the province of West Kalimantan, Borneo, Indonesia. It is under the pastoral responsibility of Bishop Pius Riana Prapdi.

The patron of the church is the religious and mystical Italian Passionist Saint Gemma Galgani. In addition to the local priest, the brothers of the Congregation of the Blessed Virgin Mary of the Immaculate Conception operate a shelter. There are also two congregations of nuns who administer a bedroom that include the Augustinian sisters.

The parish is the mother church of the area, which was designated an apostolic prefecture in 1954. It was elevated to cathedral status when the prefecture was erected as a diocese in 1961 by the bull "Quod Christus" of Pope John XXIII.

== See also ==
- Catholic Church in Indonesia
- List of cathedrals in Indonesia
