= St. Francis Xavier Cathedral, Ambon =

St. Francis Xavier Cathedral
- Katedral Santo Fransiskus Xaverius
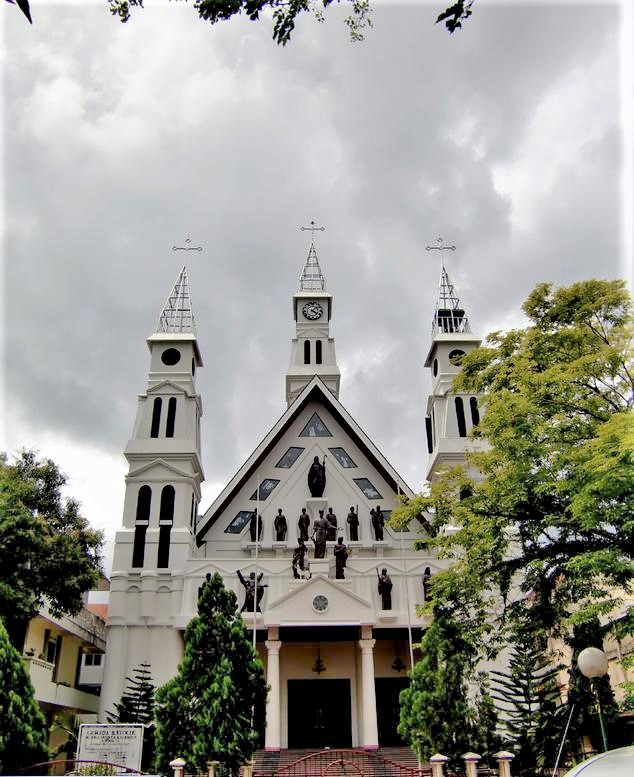
- St. Francis Xavier Cathedral
- Location: Ambon
- Country: Indonesia
- Denomination: Catholic Church

St. Francis Xavier Cathedral (Indonesian: Katedral Santo Fransiskus Xaverius ), also called Ambon Cathedral, is the cathedral of the Roman Catholic Diocese of Amboina (Dioecesis Amboinaënsis or Keuskupan Amboina) in Ambon, Maluku, Indonesia.

It is the mother church of the diocese, which began as an apostolic prefecture in 1902 and was elevated to its current status in 1961 by the bull "Quod Christus" of Pope John XXIII.

It is under the pastoral responsibility of Bishop Seno Ngutra, who succeeded Petrus Canisius Mandagi.

The church's patron is the Spanish priest St. Francis Xavier, who spread Christianity to the Moluccas.

== See also ==
- Catholic Church in Indonesia
