= Aloysius Maryadi Sutrisnaatmaka =

21st-century Indonesian Catholic bishop

Aloysius Maryadi Sutrisnaatmaka M.S.F.
- Bishop of the Diocese of Palangkaraya
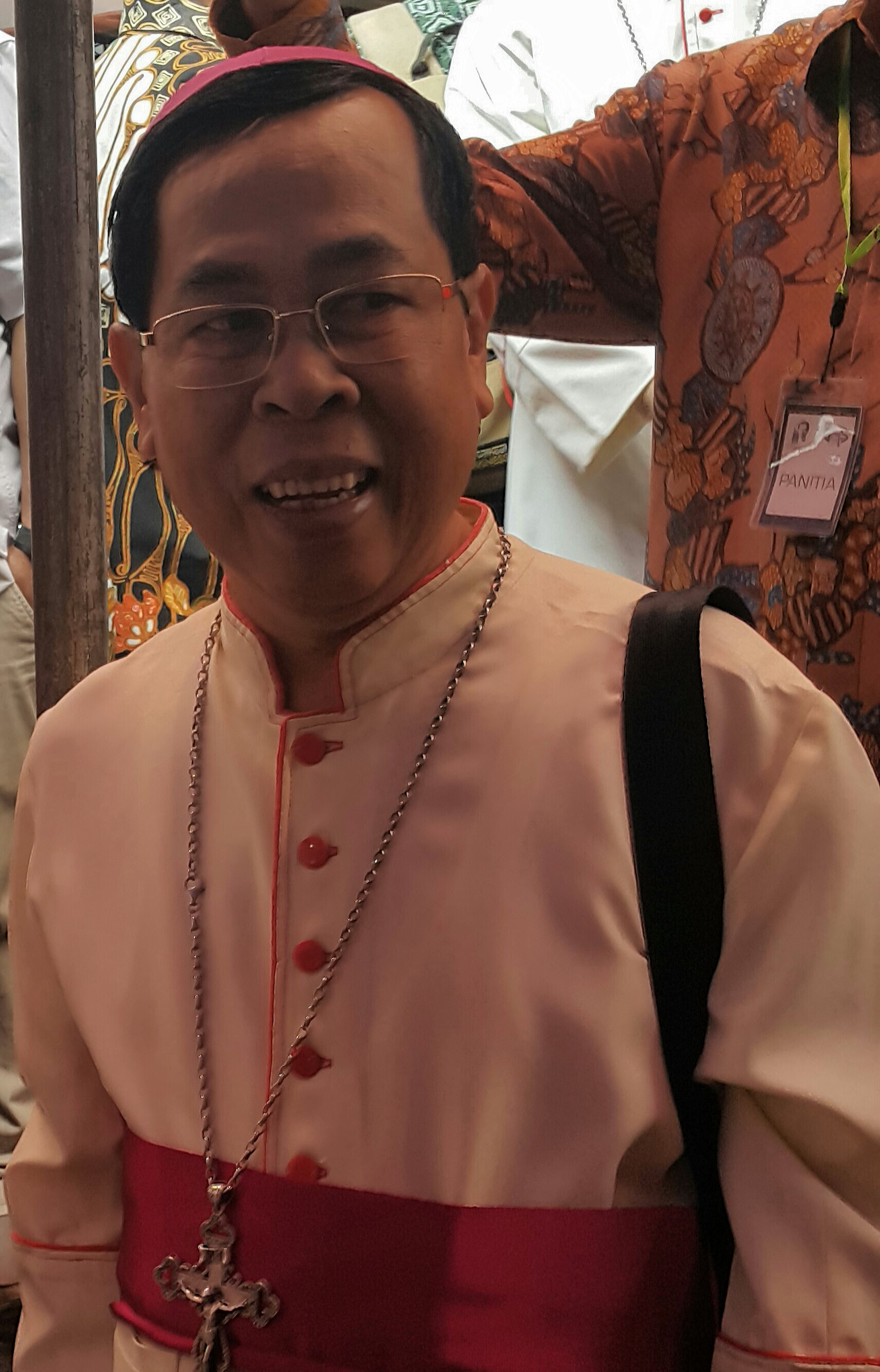
- Sutrisnaatmaka in 2017
- Church: Roman Catholic Church
- Diocese: Diocese of Palangkaraya
- In office: 2001–
- Predecessor: Yulius Aloysius Husin, M.S.F.
- Previous post: Priest

Orders
- Ordination: 6 January 1981
- Consecration: 7 May 2001
- Rank: Bishop

Personal details
- Born: 18 May 1953 (age 73) Wedi, Klaten Regency, Central Java, Indonesia

Aloysius Maryadi Sutrisnaatmaka M.S.F. (born 18 May 1953) is an Indonesian Roman Catholic bishop.

On 6 January 1981 Harjosusanto was ordained a priest of the congregation of the Missionaries of the Holy Family. On 23 January 2001, Sutrisnaatmaka was nominated as the bishop of the Roman Catholic Diocese of Palangkaraya, and on 7 May 2001 he was ordained bishop by Julius Darmaatmadja.
