= Florentinus Sului Hajang Hau =

Indonesian Roman Catholic archbishop

Florentinus Sului Hajang Hau M.S.F.
- Archbishop of Samarinda
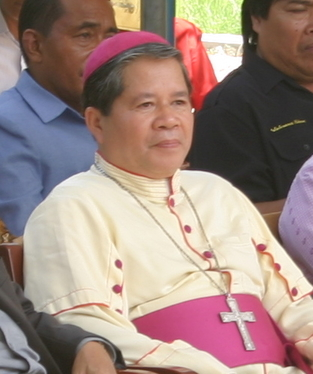
- Florentinus Sului Hajang Hau in 2005
- Church: Catholic Church
- Archdiocese: Archdiocese of Samarinda
- In office: 5 April 1993 – 18 July 2013
- Predecessor: Michael Cornelis C. Coomans
- Successor: Yustinus Harjosusanto

Orders
- Ordination: 16 February 1976
- Consecration: 21 November 1993 by Yulius Aloysius Husin

Personal details
- Born: 11 December 1948 Tering, East Borneo Region, United States of Indonesia
- Died: 18 July 2013 (aged 64)

Florentius Sului Hajang Hau (11 December 1948 − 18 July 2013) was an Indonesian Roman Catholic archbishop.

Ordained to the priesthood in 1973, Sului Hajang Hau was named bishop of the Roman Catholic Diocese of Samarinda, Indonesia in 1993. In 2003, he was appointed Archbishop of the Roman Catholic Archdiocese of Samarinda and died in 2013 while still in office.
