= Diocese of Tanjung Selor =

Roman Catholic diocese in Borneo, Indonesia

Diocese of Tanjung Selor Dioecesis Tanjungselorensis Keuskupan Tanjung Selor
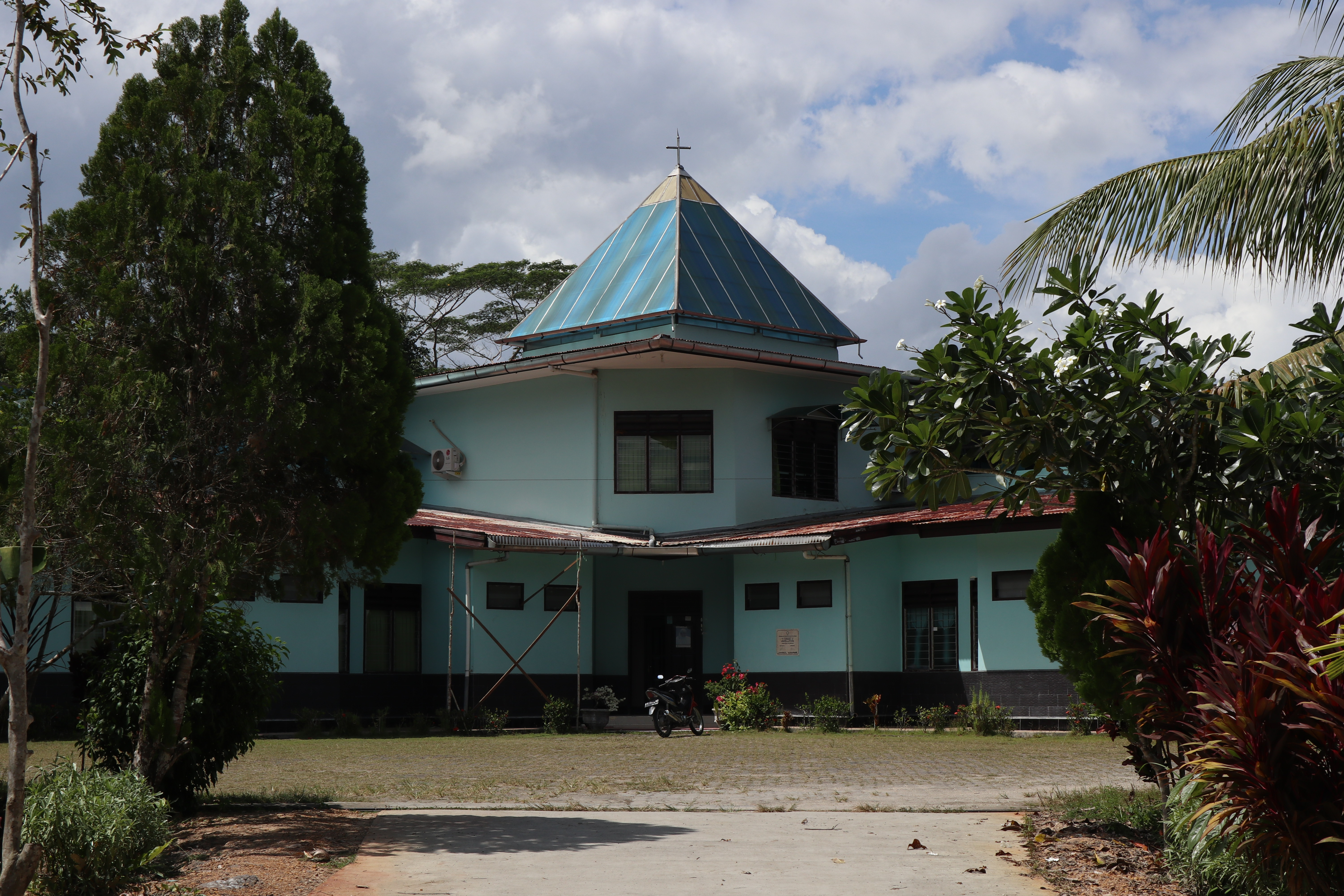
- Catholic church in Tanjung Selor

Location
- Country: Indonesia
- Ecclesiastical province: Samarinda
- Metropolitan: Samarinda

Statistics
- Area: 96,630 km^{2} (37,310 sq mi)
- Population: Total; Catholics: (as of 2004); 482,000; 40,772 (8.5%)

Information
- Rite: Latin Rite
- Cathedral: Cathedral of the Assumption in Tanjung Selor

Current leadership
- Pope: Leo XIV
- Bishop: Mgr Paulinus Yan Olla, M.S.F.
- Metropolitan Archbishop: Justinus Harjosusanto, M.S.F.

The Roman Catholic Diocese of Tanjung Selor (Latin: Tanjungseloren(sis)) is a diocese located in the city of Tanjung Selor in the ecclesiastical province of Samarinda in Indonesia.

== History ==
- January 9, 2002: Established as the Diocese of Tanjung Selor from the Diocese of Samarinda

== Leadership ==
- Bishops of Tanjung Selor (Roman rite)
  - Bishop Justinus Tarmana Harjosusanto, M.S.F. (January 9, 2002 – February 16, 2015)
  - Bishop Paulinus Yan Olla, M.S.F. (May 5, 2018–present)
