= Seno Ngutra =

21st-century Indonesian Catholic bishop (born 1970)

- Bishop of Amboina
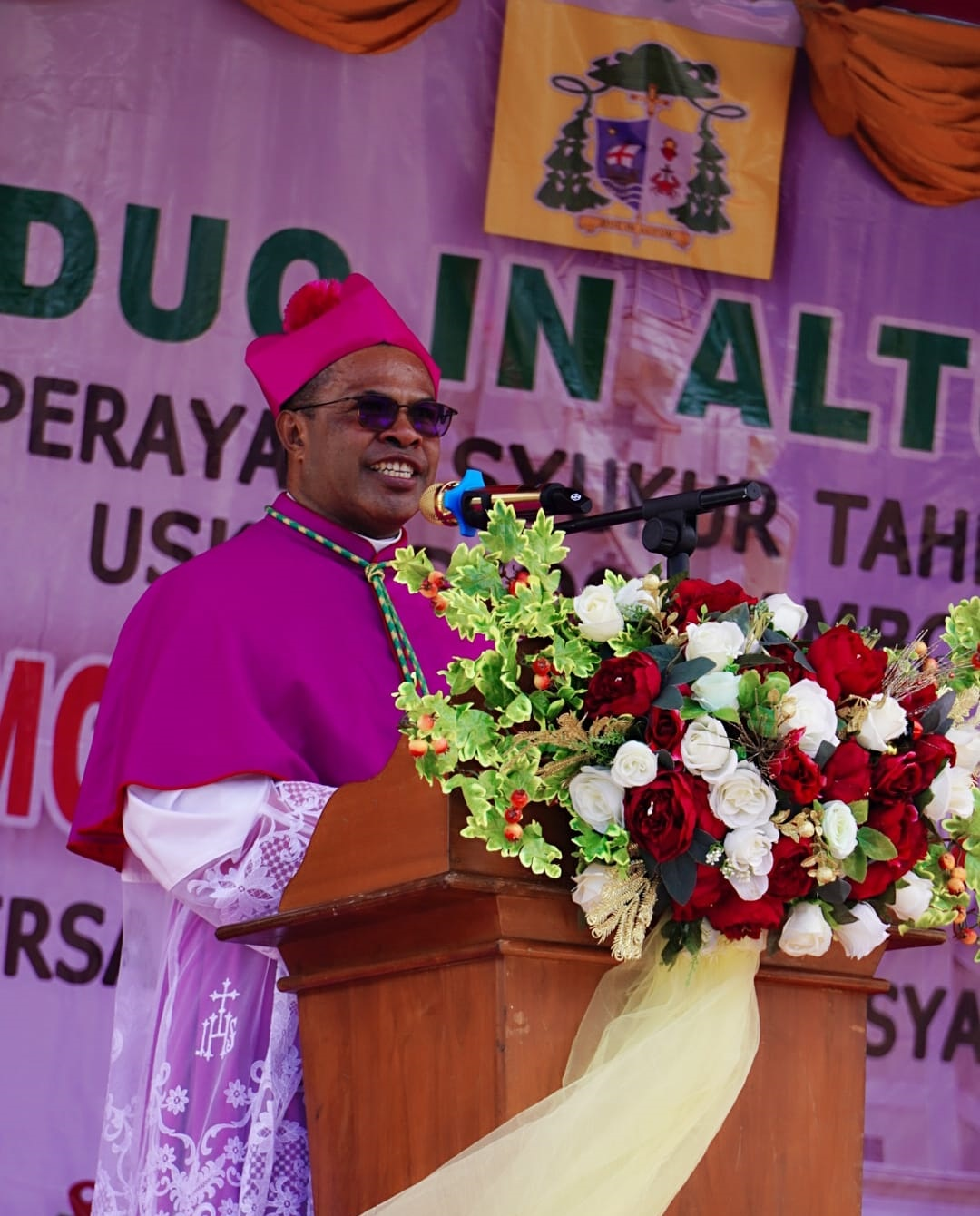
- Church: Roman Catholic Church
- Diocese: Diocese of Amboina
- Predecessor: Petrus Canisius Mandagi

Orders
- Ordination: 6 October 2001 by Petrus Canisius Mandagi
- Consecration: 23 April 2022 by Piero Pioppo

Personal details
- Born: 7 November 1970 (age 55) Waur, Southeast Maluku Regency, Maluku, Indonesia
- Denomination: Roman Catholic
- Motto: Duc in altum (Luke 5:4)
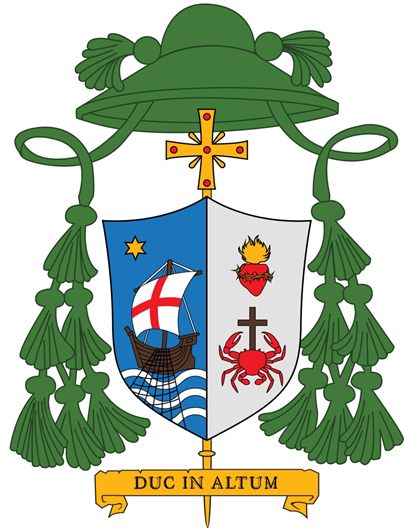
- Coat of arms

Seno "Inno" Ngutra (born 7 November 1970) is the Indonesian Roman Catholic bishop of Diocese of Amboina, being appointed in 2021.

Born in the town of Waur in Maluku, after high school Ngutra entered the St. Yudas Tadeus Minor Seminary in Langgur and he studied Philosophy and Theology in the interdiocesan Major Seminary of Pineleng in Manado. He was ordained a priest on 6 October 2001 for the diocese of Amboina.

In December 2021, it was announced that Ngutra had been appointed as the fourth Bishop of Amboina, succeeding Petrus Canisius Mandagi, M.S.C. Prior to becoming Bishop of Amboina, he was Secretary of the Diocese of Amboina as well as a Lecturer in Law at St. Francis Xavier's Higher Seminary Church, Poka Rumah Tiga, Ambon. He also worked as a parish priest and a canon law lawyer.
