= Archdiocese of Pontianak =

Roman Catholic archdiocese in West Kalimantan, Indonesia

Coordinates: 0.0000°N 109.3330°E

Archdiocese of Pontianak Archidioecesis Pontianakensis Keuskupan Agung Pontianak
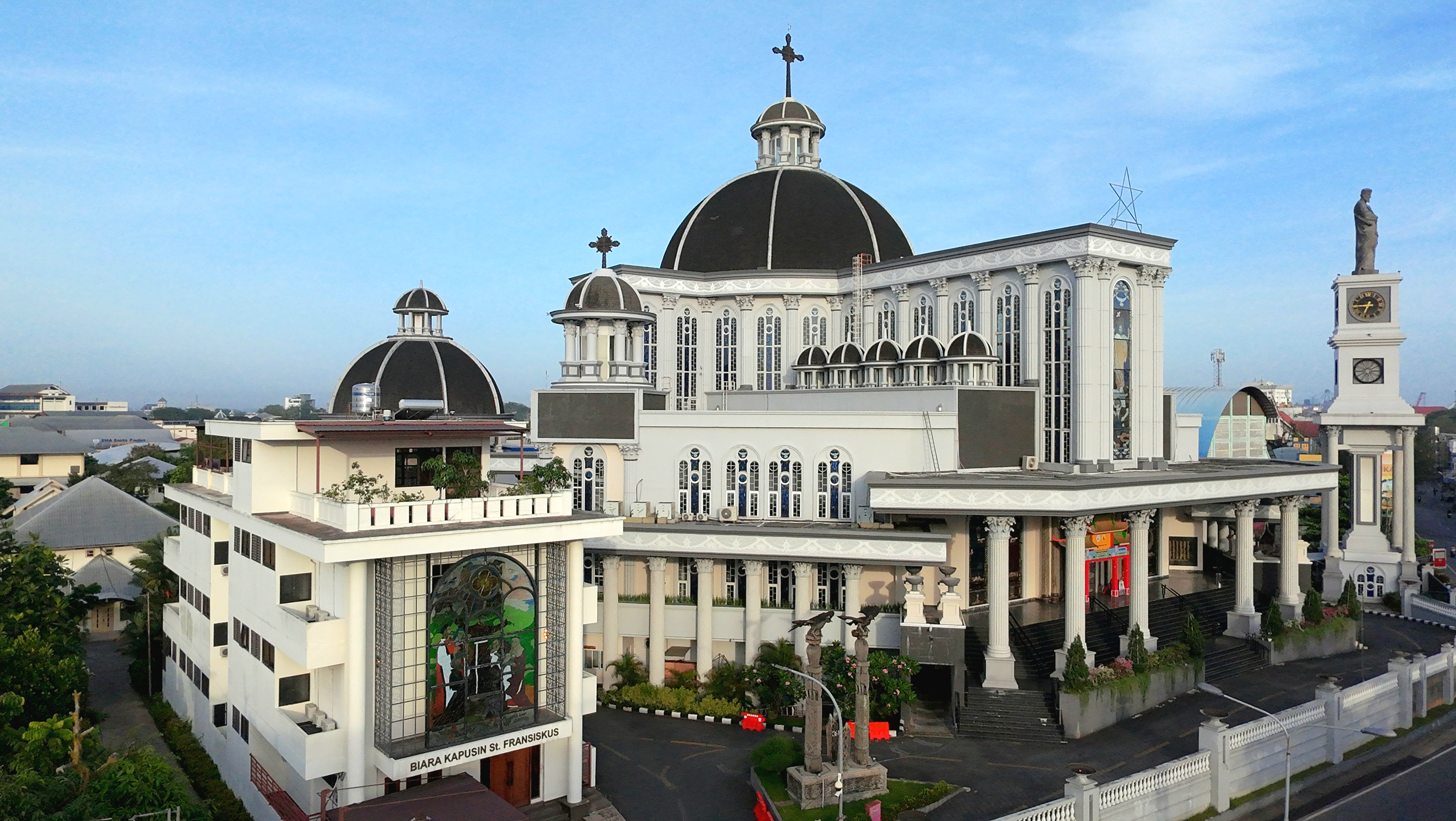
- Pontianak Cathedral in 2026

Location
- Country: Indonesia
- Ecclesiastical province: Pontianak

Statistics
- Area: 39,840 km^{2} (15,380 sq mi)
- Population: Total; Catholics: (as of 2023); 3,301,000; 738,000 (22.4%)
- Parishes: 29

Information
- Denomination: Catholic Church
- Sui iuris church: Latin Church
- Rite: Roman Rite
- Established: 11 February 1905; 121 years ago
- Cathedral: St. Joseph's Cathedral in Pontianak, Indonesia
- Secular priests: 110 (18 Diocesan, 92 Religious Orders)

Current leadership
- Pope: Leo XIV
- Metropolitan Archbishop: sede vacante
- Apostolic Administrator: Samuel Oton Sidin, O.F.M.Cap
- Bishops emeritus: Agustinus Agus

Map

The Roman Catholic Archdiocese of Pontianak (Latin: Pontianaken[sis]) is an archdiocese located in the city of Pontianak in West Kalimantan in Indonesia.

== History ==
- 11 February 1905: Established as the Apostolic Prefecture of Dutch Borneo from the Apostolic Vicariate of Batavia
- 13 March 1918: Promoted as Apostolic Vicariate of Dutch Borneo
- 21 May 1938: Renamed as Apostolic Vicariate of Pontianak
- 3 January 1961: Promoted as Metropolitan Archdiocese of Pontianak

== Leadership ==
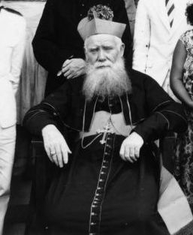
Bishop Jan Pacificus Bos OFMCap

=== Prefect of Dutch Borneo (Roman Rite) ===
- Jan Pacificus Bos, O.F.M.Cap (10 April 1905 – 14 March 1918 see below)

=== Vicars Apostolic of Dutch Borneo (Roman Rite) ===
- Jan Pacificus Bos, O.F.M.Cap (see above 14 March 1918 – 1933), resigned
- Tarcisius van Valenberg, O.F.M.Cap (10 December 1934 – 21 May 1938 see below)

=== Vicars Apostolic of Pontianak (Roman Rite) ===
- Tarcisius van Valenberg, O.F.M.Cap (see above 21 May 1938 – 13 July 1957), resigned
- Herculanus Joannes Maria van der Burgt, O.F.M.Cap (13 July 1957 – 3 January 1961 see below)

=== Archbishops of Pontianak (Roman rite) ===
- Herculanus Joannes Maria van der Burgt, O.F.M.Cap (see above 3 January 1961 – 2 July 1976)
- Hieronymus Herculanus Bumbun, O.F.M.Cap (26 February 1977 – 3 June 2014), retired
- Agustinus Agus, O.P. (3 June 2014 – 30 August 2025), retired
  - Apostolic Administrator Samuel Oton Sidin, O.F.M.Cap (30 August 2025 – Present), Bishop of Sintang

=== Auxiliary Bishops ===
- Hieronymus Herculanus Bumbun, O.F.M.Cap (1975-1977), Titular Bishop of Capra

== Suffragan dioceses ==
- Ketapang
- Sanggau
- Sintang

== See also ==
Catholic Church in Indonesia
