= Yustinus Harjosusanto =

21st-century Indonesian Catholic bishop

Yustinus Harjosusanto M.S.F.
- Archbishop of the Archdiocese of Samarinda
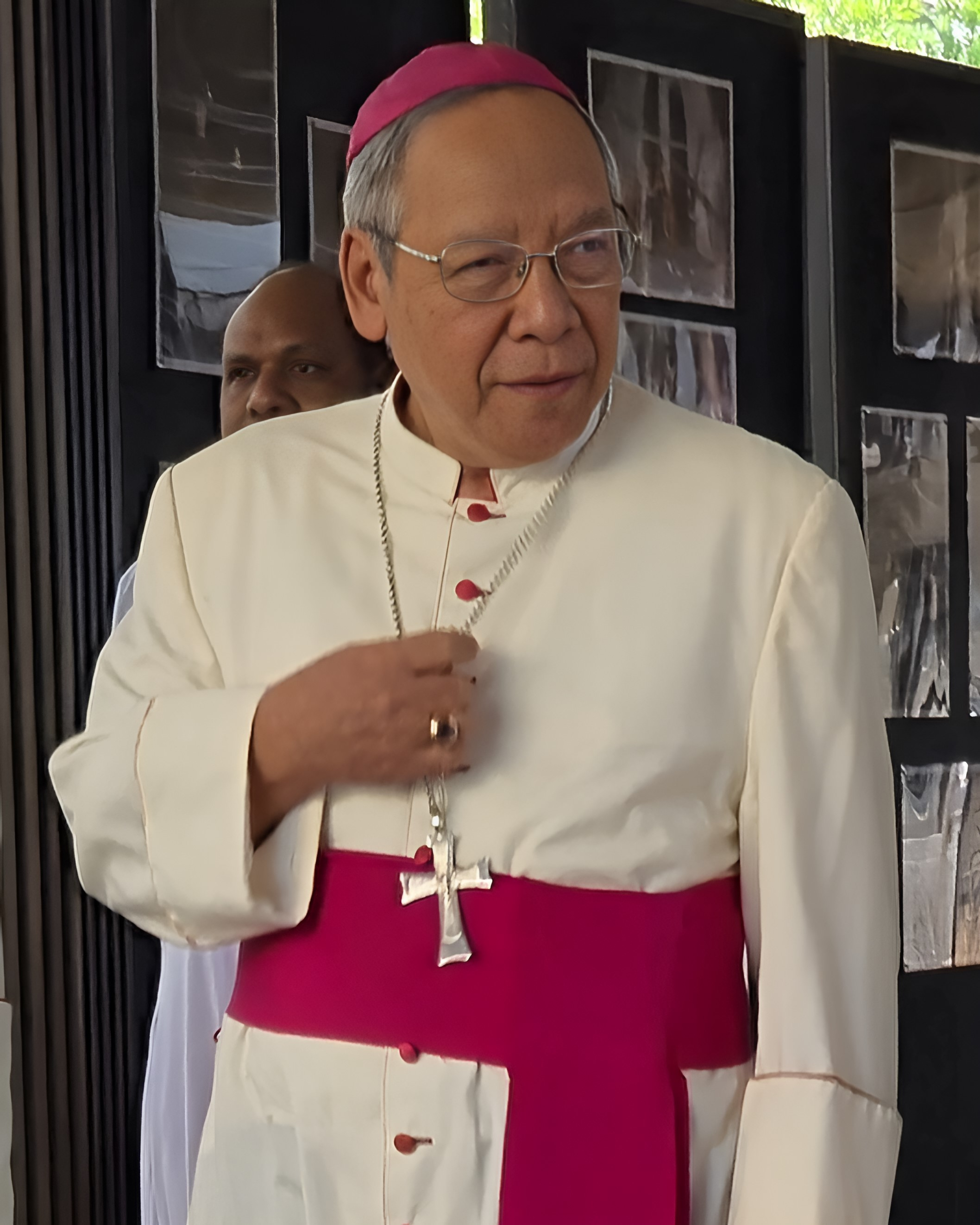
- Harjosusanto in 2017
- Church: Roman Catholic Church
- Archdiocese: Archdiocese of Samarinda
- In office: 2015–
- Predecessor: Florentinus Sului Hajang Hau
- Previous post: Bishop of the Diocese of Tanjung Selor

Orders
- Ordination: 6 January 1982
- Consecration: 14 April 2002
- Rank: Bishop

Personal details
- Born: 5 September 1953 (age 72) Srumbung, Magelang Regency, Central Java, Indonesia

Yustinus Harjosusanto M.S.F. (born 5 September 1953) is an Indonesian Roman Catholic archbishop.

== Biography ==
On 6 January 1982 Harjosusanto was ordained a priest of the congregation of the Missionaries of the Holy Family. On 9 January 2002, Harjosusanto was nominated as the bishop of the recently formed Roman Catholic Diocese of Tanjung Selor, and on 14 April 2002 he was ordained bishop in Saint Mary's Church, Tarakan.

On 15 February 2015 Harjosusanto was chosen by Pope Francis to be archbishop of the Roman Catholic Archdiocese of Samarinda, succeeding the deceased Florentinus Sului Hajang Hau.
