= Diocese of Amboina =

Roman Catholic diocese in Maluku, Indonesia

Coordinates: 3.7000°S 128.1670°E

Diocese of Amboina Diœcesis Amboinaënsis Keuskupan Amboina
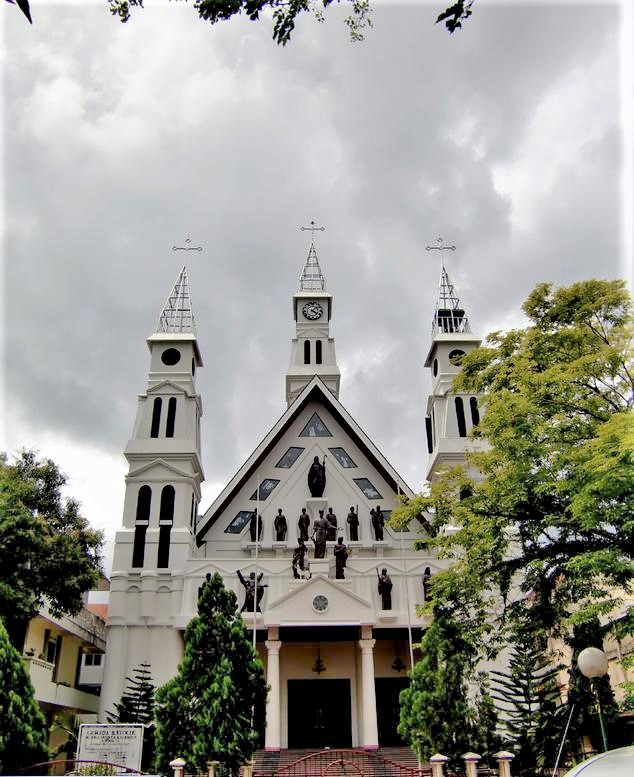
- St Francis Xavier Cathedral in Ambon

Location
- Country: Indonesia
- Territory: Maluku; North Maluku
- Ecclesiastical province: Makassar
- Metropolitan: Makassar
- Deaneries: Ambon; Aru Islands; Great Kai; Little Kai; Tanimbar Islands; North Maluku; Seram–Buru

Statistics
- Area: 83,777 km^{2} (32,346 sq mi)
- Population: Total; Catholics: (as of 2012); 2,311,000; 127,609 (5.5%)

Information
- Denomination: Catholic Church
- Sui iuris church: Latin Church
- Rite: Latin rite
- Established: 1534 as diocese of Amboina re-established 22 December 1902
- Cathedral: St Francis Xavier Cathedral
- Secular priests: 127
- Language: Latin; Indonesian

Current leadership
- Pope: Leo XIV
- Bishop: Seno Ngutra
- Vicar General: Antonius Kawole
- Judicial Vicar: Paul Kalkoy

The Roman Catholic Diocese of Amboina (Latin: Amboinaën(sis)) is a diocese located in the city of Amboina in the ecclesiastical province of Makassar in Indonesia.

== History ==
- It was founded as the Diocese of Amboina in 1534 under Spanish rule and as the seat of St. Francis Xavier.
- As part of the mission of the Diocese of Manila in 1595.
- December 22, 1902: Established as the Apostolic Prefecture of Dutch New Guinea from the Apostolic Vicariate of Batavia
- August 29, 1920: Promoted as the Apostolic Vicariate of Dutch New Guinea
- May 12, 1949: Renamed as Apostolic Vicariate of Amboina
- January 3, 1961: Promoted as Diocese of Amboina

== Leadership ==
- Bishops of Amboina (Roman rite)
  - Bishop Seno Ngutra (8 December 2021 – present)
  - Bishop Petrus Canisius Mandagi, M.S.C. (10 June 1994 – 11 November 2020)
  - Bishop Andreas Peter Cornelius Sol, M.S.C. (15 January 1965 – 10 June 1994)
  - Bishop Jacques Grent, M.S.C. (3 January 1961 – 15 January 1965)
- Vicars Apostolic of Amboina (Roman Rite)
  - Bishop Jacques Grent, M.S.C. (12 May 1949 – 3 January 1961)
- Vicars Apostolic of Dutch New Guinea (Roman Rite)
  - Bishop Jacques Grent, M.S.C. (10 July 1947 – 12 May 1949)
  - Bishop Giovanni Aerts, M.S.C. (28 August 1920 – 1942. Death execution)
- Prefects Apostolic of Dutch New Guinea (Roman Rite)
  - Fr. Hendrik Nollen, M.S.C. (1915 – 1920)
  - Fr. Matthijs Neyens, M.S.C. (1902 – 1915. Dismissed)

== Bibliography ==
- Steenbrink, Karel (2007), Catholics in Indonesia, 1903-1942 : A Documented History, vol. 2, Brill, ISBN 978-90-67-18260-7
