= Diocese of Ketapang =

Roman Catholic diocese in West Kalimantan, Indonesia

Coordinates: 1.8531°S 109.9706°E

Diocese of Ketapang Dioecesis Ketapangensis Keuskupan Ketapang

Location
- Country: Indonesia
- Ecclesiastical province: Pontianak
- Metropolitan: Pontianak

Statistics
- Area: 35,809 km^{2} (13,826 sq mi)
- Population: Total; Catholics: (as of 2023); 616,800; 136,800 (22.2%)

Information
- Rite: Latin Rite
- Cathedral: St. Gemma Galgani Cathedral in Ketapang

Current leadership
- Pope: Leo XIV
- Bishop: Pius Riana Prapdi
- Metropolitan Archbishop: sede vacante
- Bishops emeritus: Blasius Pujoraharja Bishop Emeritus (1979-2012)

Website
- Website of the Diocese

Roman Catholic Diocese of Ketapang (Latin: Ketapangen(sis)) is a diocese located in the district of Ketapang in the ecclesiastical province of Pontianak in Indonesia.

== History ==
- 14 June 1954: Established as the Apostolic Prefecture of Ketapang from the Apostolic Vicariate of Pontianak
- 3 January 1961: Promoted as Diocese of Ketapang

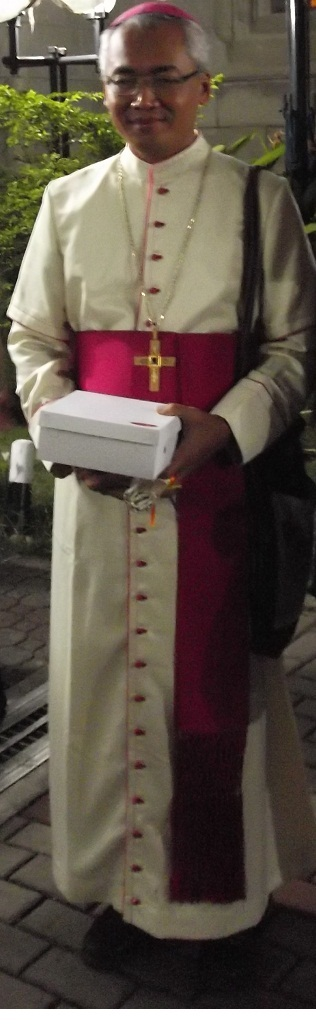
Bishop Pius Riana Prapdi

== Leadership ==
- Bishops of Ketapang (Roman rite)
  - Bishop Pius Riana Prapdi (9 September 2012 – present)
  - Bishop Blasius Pujoraharja (15 March 1979 – 25 June 2012)
  - Bishop Gabriel W. Sillekens, C.P. (3 January 1961 – 15 March 1979)
- Prefects Apostolic of Ketapang (Roman Rite)
  - Fr. Gabriel W. Sillekens, C.P. (later Bishop) (25 August 1954 – 3 January 1961)
