= St. Mary's Cathedral, Samarinda =

St. Mary's Cathedral
- Katedral Santa Maria
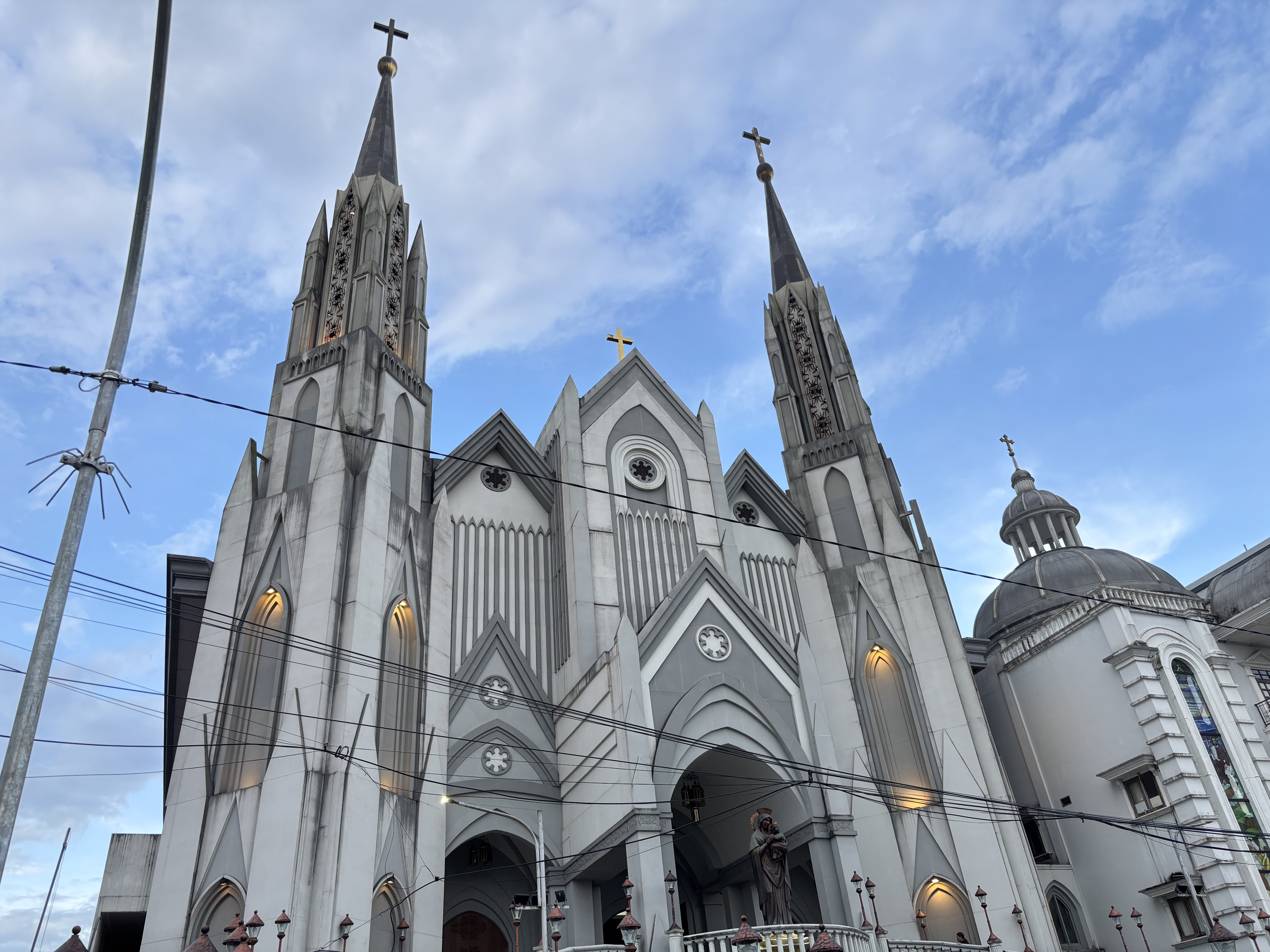
- St. Mary's Cathedral
- Location: Samarinda
- Country: Indonesia
- Denomination: Roman Catholic Church

The Cathedral of Saint Mary the Eternal Helper (Indonesian: Katedral Santa Maria Penolong Abadi), also called Samarinda Cathedral or Paroki Katedral Samarinda, is a parish of the Roman Catholic Church in Samarinda, East Kalimantan, Borneo, Indonesia. It is the mother church and seat of the Metropolitan Archdiocese of Samarinda (Archidioecesis Samarindaënsis or Keuskupan Agung Samarinda), under the pastoral responsibility of Archbishop Justinus Harjosusanto.

It was designated the cathedral with the elevation of the diocese to an archdiocese by the Bull "Cum Ecclesia" of Pope John Paul II, proclaimed in 2003.

The cathedral has a chapel dedicated to Saints Peter and Paul (Kapel St.Petrus-Paulus).

== See also ==
- Catholic Church in Indonesia
