= Three Kings Cathedral, Timika =

Three Kings Cathedral
- Katedral Tiga Raja
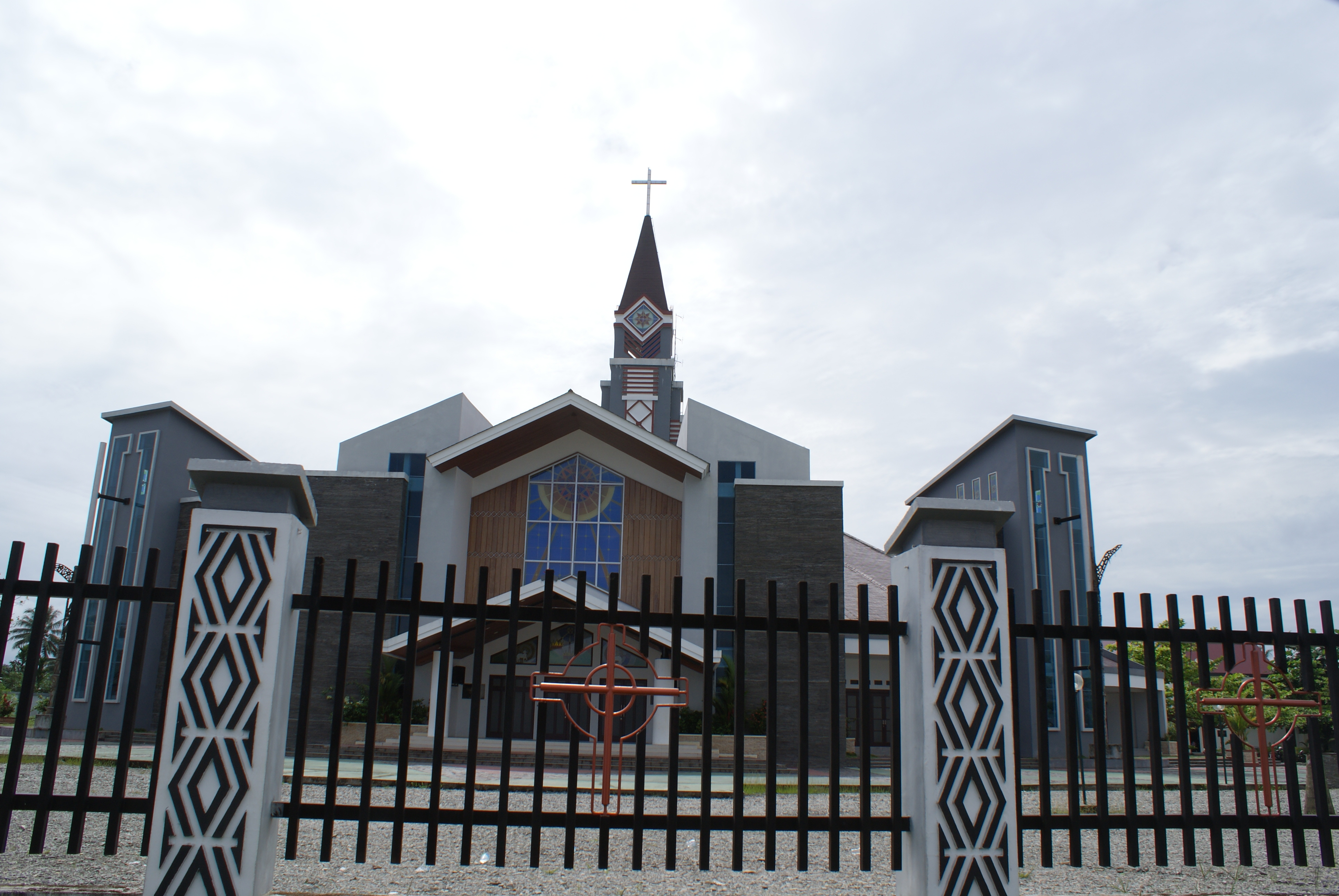
- Three Kings Cathedral
- 4.5430°S 136.8903°E
- Location: Timika
- Country: Indonesia
- Denomination: Roman Catholic Church

The Three Kings Cathedral (Indonesian: Katedral Tiga Raja) also called Timika Cathedral is a religious building belonging to the Catholic Church, located in the town of Timika, in Mimika Regency, Central Papua, Indonesia.

The temple follows the Roman or Latin rite and functions as the main or mother church of the Diocese of Timika (Dioecesis Timikaënsis or Keuskupan Timika) which was created in 2003 by bull "Supernum evangelizationis" of Pope John Paul II.

The building was built between 2004 and 2005 and was formally enshrined in the 2010 with the presence of the apostolic nuncio (Vatican ambassador in Indonesia) Leopoldo Girelli. The structure can receive 2 thousand parishioners and reaches a maximum height in the tower of 55 meters.

In 2015 the cathedral suffered an attack by Indonesian soldiers in which 2 people died.

== See also ==
- Roman Catholicism in Indonesia
- Three Kings
