= Diocese of Jayapura =

Roman Catholic diocese in Papua, Indonesia

Coordinates: 2°31′S 140°43′E

Diocese of Jayapura Dioecesis Iayapuraensis Keuskupan Jayapura

Location
- Country: Indonesia
- Ecclesiastical province: Merauke
- Metropolitan: Merauke

Statistics
- Area: 115,349 km^{2} (44,536 sq mi)
- Population: Total; Catholics: (as of 2006); 858,000; 65,180 (7.6%)

Information
- Rite: Latin Rite
- Cathedral: Cathedral of Christ the King in Jayapura

Current leadership
- Pope: Leo XIV
- Bishop: Yanuarius Theofilus Matopai You
- Metropolitan Archbishop: Petrus Kanisius Mandagi M.S.C.
- Bishops emeritus: Leo Laba Ladjar O.F.M.

The Roman Catholic Diocese of Jayapura (Latin: Iayapuraen(sis)) is a diocese located in the city of Jayapura in the ecclesiastical province of Merauke in Indonesia.

== History ==
- May 12, 1949: Established as the Apostolic Prefecture of Hollandia from the Apostolic Vicariate of Dutch New Guinea
- June 14, 1954: Promoted as the Apostolic Vicariate of Hollandia
- June 28, 1963: Renamed as Apostolic Vicariate of Kota Baru
- June 12, 1964: Renamed as Apostolic Vicariate of Sukarnapura
- November 15, 1966: Promoted as Diocese of Sukarnapura
- April 25, 1969: Renamed as Diocese of Djajapura
- August 22, 1973: Renamed as Diocese of Jayapura

== Leadership ==
- Bishops of Jayapura (Roman rite)
  - Yanuarius Teofilus Matopai You (October 29, 2022 – present)
  - Bishop Leo Laba Ladjar, O.F.M. (August 29, 1997 – October 29, 2022)
  - Bishop Herman Ferdinandus Maria Münninghoff, O.F.M. (August 22, 1973 – August 29, 1997)
- Bishops of Djajapura (Roman Rite)
  - Bishop Herman Ferdinandus Maria Münninghoff, O.F.M. (May 6, 1972 – August 22, 1973)
  - Bishop Rudolf Joseph Manfred Staverman, O.F.M. (April 25, 1969 – May 6, 1972)
- Bishops of Sukarnapura (Roman Rite)
  - Bishop Rudolf Joseph Manfred Staverman, O.F.M. (November 15, 1966 – April 25, 1969)
- Vicars Apostolic of Sukarnapura (Roman Rite)
  - Bishop Rudolf Joseph Manfred Staverman, O.F.M. (June 12, 1964 – November 15, 1966)
- Vicars Apostolic of Kota Baru (Roman Rite)
  - Bishop Rudolf Joseph Manfred Staverman, O.F.M. (June 28, 1963 – June 12, 1964)
- Vicars Apostolic of Hollandia (Roman Rite)
  - Bishop Rudolf Joseph Manfred Staverman, O.F.M. (April 29, 1956 – June 28, 1963)
- Prefects Apostolic of Hollandia (Roman Rite)
  - Fr. Oscar Cremers, O.F.M. (June 3, 1949 – 1954)
