= Vincentius Sutikno Wisaksono =

Indonesian bishop (1953–2023)

The Most Reverend Mgr Vincentius Sutikno Wicaksono
- Bishop of Surabaya
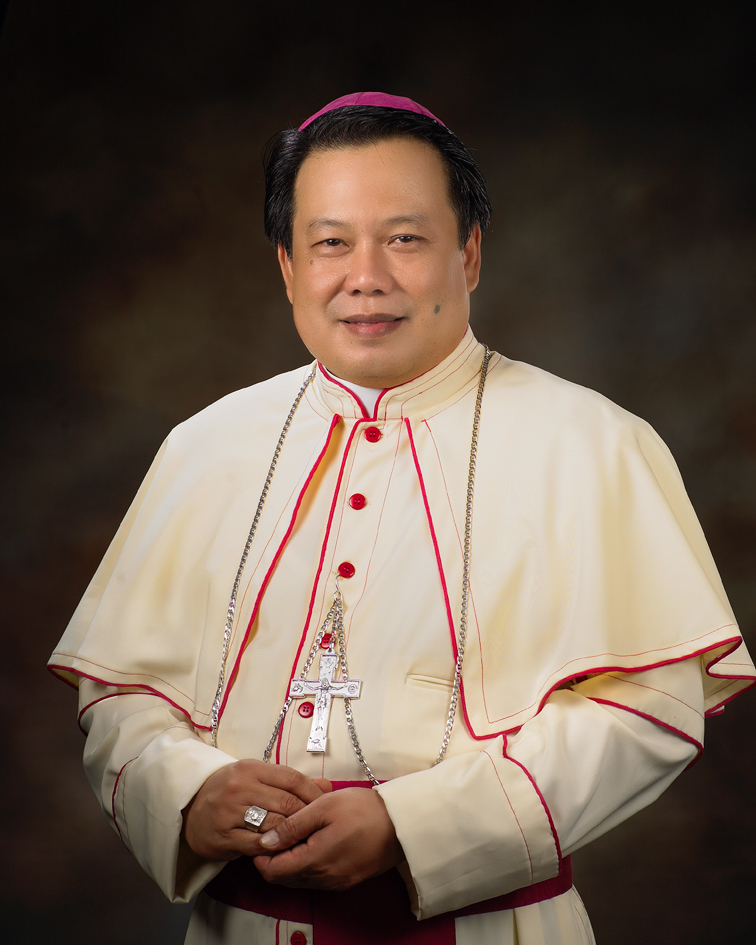
- Official Portrait
- Church: Catholic Church
- Province: Semarang
- See: Surabaya
- Installed: 3 April 2007
- Term ended: 10 August 2023
- Predecessor: Johannes Sudiarna Hadiwikarta
- Successor: Agustinus Tri Budi Utomo

Orders
- Ordination: 21 January 1982 by Jan Antonius Klooster, C.M.
- Consecration: 29 June 2007 by Julius Cardinal Darmaatmadja, S.J.

Personal details
- Born: Oei Tik Haw; 26 September 1953 Surabaya, East Java, Indonesia
- Died: 10 August 2023 (aged 69) Surabaya, East Java, Indonesia
- Buried: Pohsarang Pieta Mausoleum; Kediri, Indonesia
- Denomination: Roman Catholic
- Residence: Cathedral of the Sacred Heart of Jesus, Surabaya, Indonesia
- Education: St. Paul Kentungan Major Seminary; Yogyakarta S.R.
- Motto: Ego veni ut vitam habeant et abundantius habeant (John 10:10); I have come that they may have life, and that they may have it more abundantly.

Monsignor Vincent Sutikno Wisaksono, born Oei Tik Hauw, (26 September 1953 – 10 August 2023) was an Indonesian Roman Catholic bishop. He served as the Bishop of Surabaya until his death in 2023. He held the position from 29 June 2007, replacing John Sudiarna Hadiwikarta who died on 13 December 2003, creating a vacancy. His motto as a bishop was "Ego veni ut vitam habeant, et abundantius habeant." (John 10:10), which means "I have come that they may have life and have it in all its abundance".

== Biography ==
Vincentius Sutikno Wisaksono was born as Oei Tik Hauw, the second child of three brothers. His father was Stephanus Oei Kok Tjia (Wisaksono) and his mother Ursula Mady Kwa Siok.

Wisaksono received his early education at Saint Michael's SDK Surabaya, then at SMPK Angelus Custos. He attended Garum Seminary, then followed his theological studies at Saint Paul Major Seminary, Faculty of Theology Wedabhakti, Yogyakarta.

Wisaksono was ordained a priest on 21 January 1982 at the age of 28 years, by Mgr. Klooster CM in the Church of the Sacred Heart of Jesus Surabaya. He first served in the Parish of St. Joseph, Kediri, East Java.

On 3 April 2007, at the Mass acceptance confirmation at the Cathedral of the Sacred Heart of Jesus in Surabaya, the Apostolic Nuncio for Indonesia and East Timor, Mgr. Leopoldo Girelli, announced the appointment of Mgr. Vincent Sutikno Wisaksono as Bishop of Surabaya, following the declaration by Pope Benedict XVI. Acting as President is Archbishop of Jakarta, Bishop Julius Cardinal Darmaatmadja, who is assisted by the Archbishop of Semarang, Bishop Ignatius Suharyo and the Bishop of Malang, Bishop Herman Joseph Sahadat Pandoyoputro.

As bishop, he forbade the holding of Mass in the framework of the special Chinese New Year celebration in the Diocese of Surabaya, despite having Chinese descent.

== Death and Succession ==
Vincentius Sutikno Wisaksono died on 10 August 2023, at St Vincent de Paul Hospital. His death was attributed to prostate cancer. The bishop also had a history of illnesses, which are: diabetes, chronic liver and chronic stomach. He was 69 at the time of his death.

Immediately after he died, the Diocese of Surabaya was without a bishop and enters the sede vacante period. Within this period, the vicar general and episcopal vicars cease to exercise their powers

The requiem mass was held on 11 August 2023 at the Surabaya Cathedral with the main celebrant being the Bishop of Bandung concurrent as President of the Bishops' Conference of Indonesia, Antonius Subianto Bunjamin. Also in the mass as concelebrant was the Apostolic Nuncio to Indonesia, Piero Pioppo; Archbishop of Samarinda, Yustinus Harjosusanto; Archbishop of Kupang, Peter Turang; Archbishop of Medan, Kornelius Sipayung; Archbishop Emeritus of Palembang, Aloysius Sudarso; Bishop Emeritus of Banjarmasin, Petrus Boddeng Timang; Bishop of Pangkal-Pinang, Adrianus Sunarko; Bishop of Bogor, Paskalis Bruno Syukur; Bishop of Purwokerto, Christophorus Tri Harsono; as well as envoy from the Diocese of Tanjungkarang, Diocese of Padang and others.

The Apostolic Nuncio to Indonesia, Piero Pioppo addressed the masses with an Apostolic Letter from Pope Francis to which they felt grave sadness to hear the passing of Mgr. Wicaksono and asked them to lead by his teachings.

Under the authority of Piero Pioppo as Apostolic Nuncio, the administrative function of the Diocese of Surabaya was to be led by a Diocesan administrator, which will be chosen by the College of Consultors on 14 August 2023. The diocesan administrator shall remain in charge until a new bishop takes possession of the see or until he presents his resignation to the college of consultors.

== Sources ==
- UCAN Diocese profile

Catholic Church titles
| Preceded by Johannes Sudiarna Hadiwikarta | Bishop of Surabaya; 2007–2023 | Succeeded by Agustinus Tri Budi Utomo |
