= Vincentius Setiawan Triatmojo =

21st-century Indonesian Catholic bishop

Mgr Vincentius Setiawan Triatmojo
- Bishop of Tanjung Karang
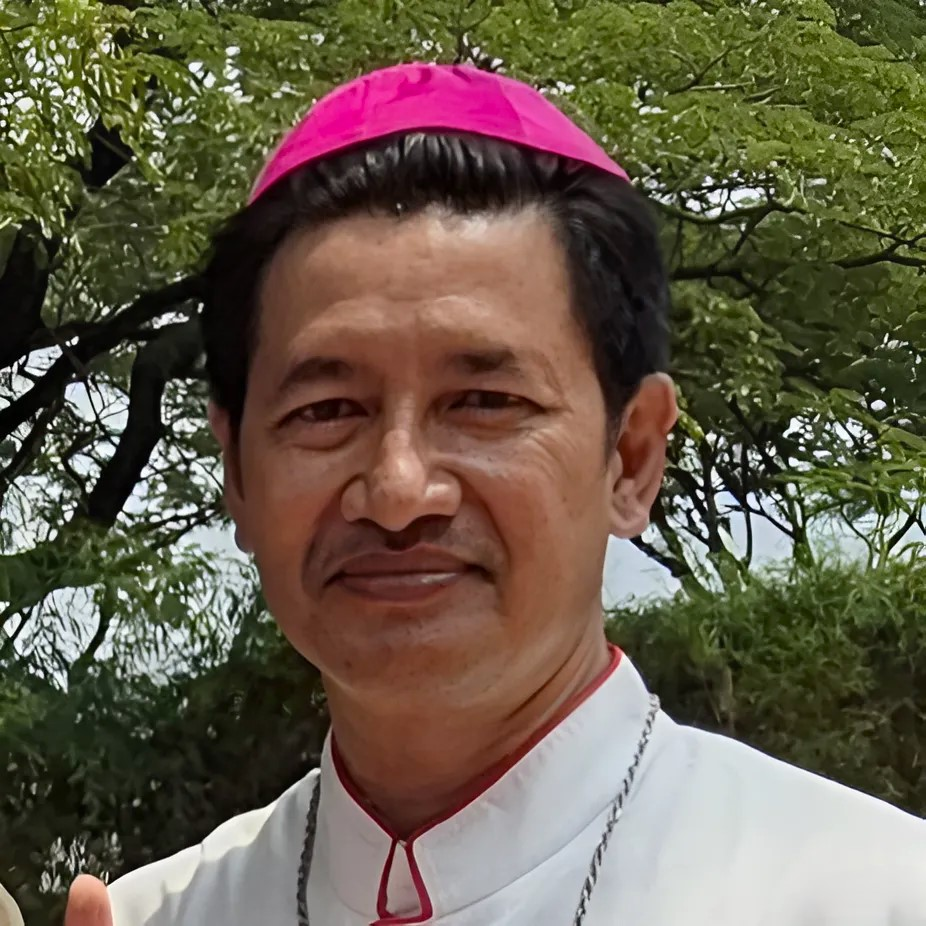
- Church: Roman Catholic Church
- Diocese: Diocese of Tanjungkarang

Orders
- Ordination: 25 January 2000 by Aloysius Sudarso
- Consecration: 1 May 2023 (3 years, 163 days) by Yohanes Harun Yuwono

Personal details
- Born: 5 April 1971 (age 55) Sindangjati, Tugumulyo, Bengkulu, Indonesia
- Denomination: Roman Catholic
- Education: Institut Catholique de Paris
- Motto: IN VERBO TUO LAXABO RETE (But at Thy word I will let down the net)

Mgr. Vinsensius Setiawan Triatmojo, Lic., S.Th. (born 5 April 1971) is an Indonesian Roman Catholic bishop. He has been appointed as the bishop of Tanjung Karang on December 17, 2022. He is a diocesan priest from the Roman Catholic Archdiocese of Palembang. He is a head of the commission of liturgy, catechetics, and Bible.

== Biography ==
He was born on April 5, 1971, in Sindangjati, Tugumulyo, Palembang, South Sumatra, Indonesia. He studied theology and philosophy at seminary in Pematang Siantar, North Sumatra, where he obtained his bachelor's degree. At the Institut Catholique de Paris he earned his postgraduate degree in theology in 2009. He was ordained as a priest in the Metropolitan Archdiocese of Palembang on January 25, 2000. After his priestly ordination, he became vicar of The Holy Trinity parish (2000-2001) and was then a parish priest in Plaju (2001-2006); in 2006 he transferred to Palembang. There he was director of youth commission from 2003 to 2009. On December 17, 2022 Pope Francis appointed him as bishop of Tanjungkarang.
