= Utomo (surname) =

Utomo is an Indonesian language surname. Notable people with the surname include:

- Hadi Utomo (1945–2017), Indonesian politician
- Donny Utomo (born 1979), Indonesian swimmer
- Risqki Putra Utomo (born 1998), Indonesian footballer
- Agustinus Tri Budi Utomo (born 1968), Indonesian Roman Catholic clergyman, bishop
- Ryuji Utomo (born 1995), Indonesian footballer
