= Agustinus Tri Budi Utomo =

Catholic bishop (born 1968)

The Most Reverend Mgr Agustinus Tri Budi Utomo
- Bishop of Surabaya
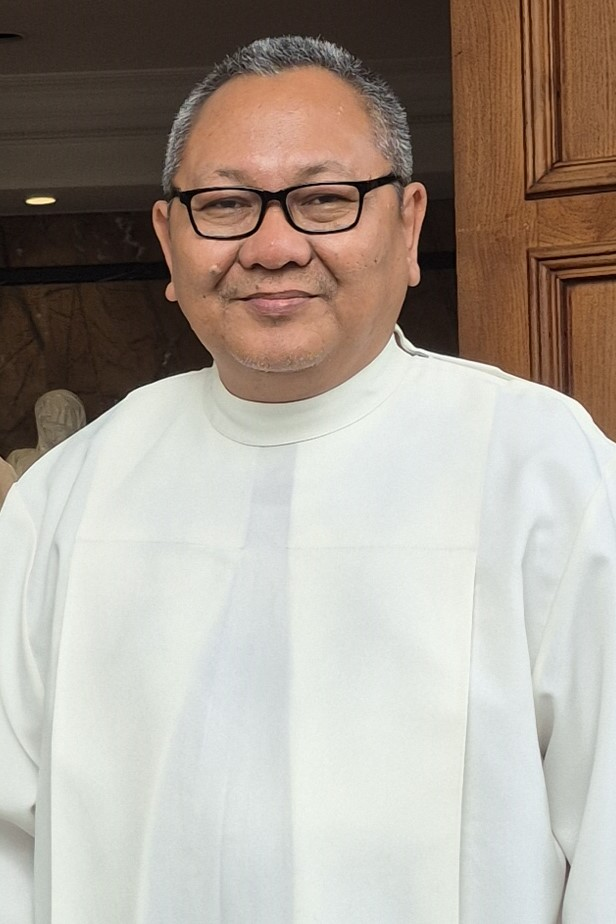
- Utomo in 2024
- Province: Semarang
- See: Surabaya
- Appointed: October 29, 2024
- Installed: January 22, 2025
- Predecessor: Vincentius Sutikno Wisaksono
- Previous posts: Vicar General of Surabaya (2011–2017); Episcopal Vicar of Surabaya (2017–2024)

Orders
- Ordination: August 27, 1996 by Johannes Sudiarna Hadiwikarta
- Consecration: January 22, 2025 by Piero Pioppo, Henricus Gunawan (co-consecrator), Pius Prapdi (co-consecrator)

Personal details
- Born: April 12, 1968 (age 58) Pandansari, Ngawi, Indonesia
- Education: Widya Sasana Philosophical and Theological College (S.Fil, MPhil)
- Motto: Diligere sicut Christus dilexit (Love as Christ Loves)

Styles of Agustinus Tri Budi Utomo
- Reference style: The Most Reverend
- Spoken style: Your Excellency
- Religious style: Bishop

Agustinus Tri Budi Utomo (born April 12, 1968) is a clergyman of the Roman Catholic Church in Indonesia. On October 29, 2024, he was named by the Holy See as Bishop of Surabaya to succeed Vincentius Wisaksono after his death in August 2023. Before his appointment as Bishop, he was the Episcopal Vicar of Surabaya.

== Biography ==
Tri Budi Utomo, often referred to as Didik, was born on April 12, 1968, in Pandansari, Sine, Ngawi. From 1987–1988, he studied at St Vincentius de Paulo Secondary Seminary in Garum, Blitar. He then continued his education at San Giovanni XXIII Malang Interdiocesan Seminary from 1989 to 1996 and obtained his Bachelor of Philosophical Divinity and Master of Philosophy from Widya Sasana Philosophical and Theological College in 1994 and 1996 respectively.

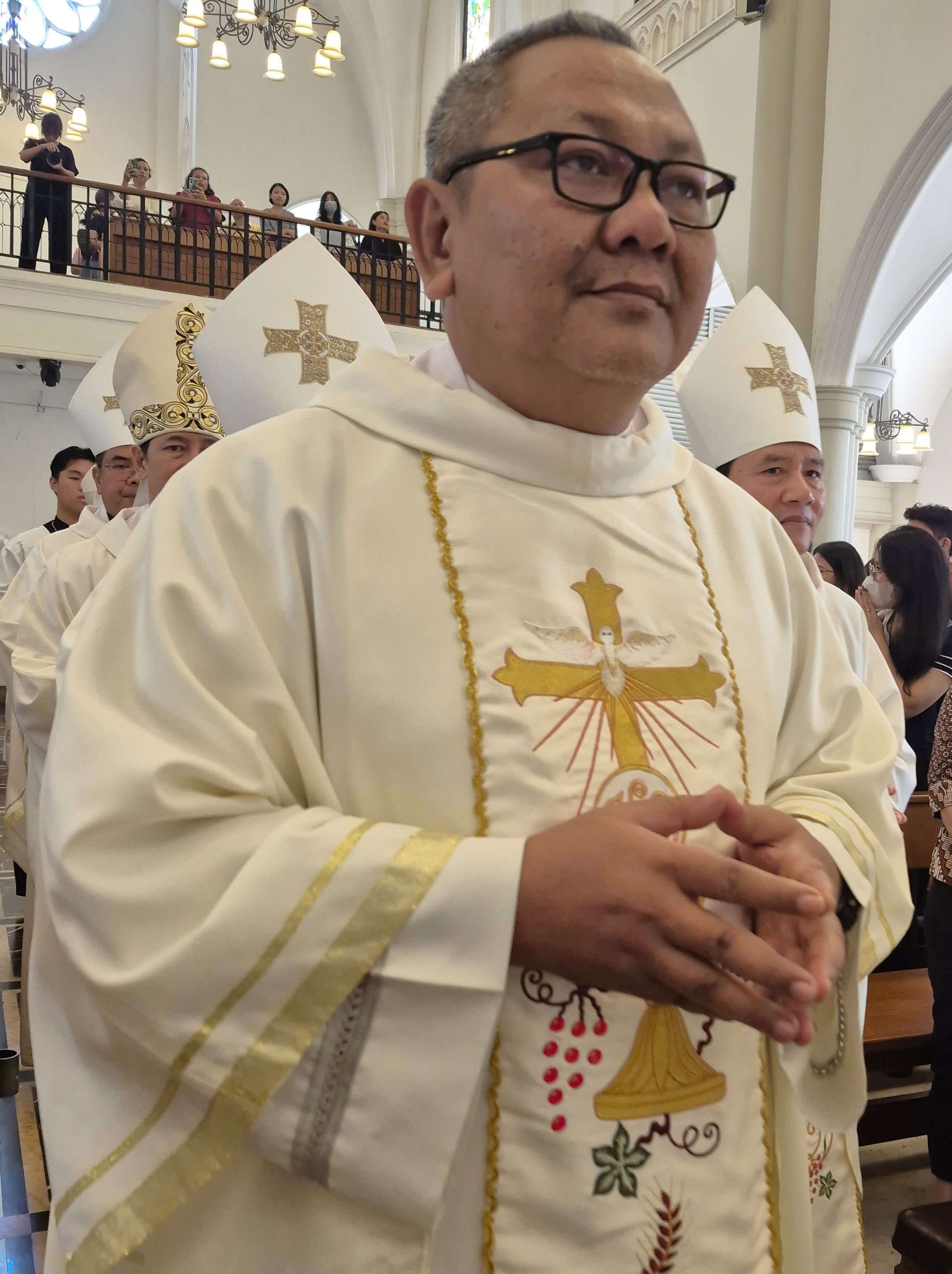
Utomo in 2024

Utomo was ordained a diocesan priest on August 27, 1996 by the then bishop of Surabaya, Johannes Sudiarna Hadiwikarta, with the ordination taking place at the Go Skate Building in the city. The sacrament of priesthood was given to 15 ordained priests, consisting of 7 diocesan priests of the Diocese of Surabaya, 7 priests of the Congregation of the Mission, and 1 priest of the Society of the Divine Word. His first assignment was as an associate pastor at the Parish of Santa Maria Annuntiata, Sidoarjo, which he held from 1996 to 2000. He also served as student pastor for the Surabaya Diocese. In 2000, he was appointed head pastor of the parish and carried out that duty until 2001.

In 2001, Utomo became a domestic missionary serving in the Diocese of Ketapang. At the beginning of his arrival, he became an associate pastor at Jesus' Child Church, Marau, Ketapang. Two years later in 2003, he was appointed head pastor of the Parish of St Carolus Borromeus in Tembelina.

Upon his return from Ketapang, he served as head pastor at St Pius X Church in Blora Regency. A year later, in 2007, he continued his ministry as an associate pastor in the same parish and was appointed as episcopal vicar of Region IV. In 2008, he served as Vicar of Cepu as well as an associate pastor at St Willibrordus Parish, Cepu. He served this role until 2011, where he was appointed vicar general of Surabaya. He held the position for six years until April 2017.

=== Bishop of Surabaya ===
On October 29, 2024, the diocesan administrator of the Diocese of Surabaya, R.D. Yosef Eko Budi Susilo, announced the appointment of Utomo as Bishop of Surabaya by the Holy See. He succeeded Vincentius Wisaksono, who died on August 10, 2023, where the diocese has remained in sede vacante ever since.

The episcopal ordination took place on January 22, 2025 at the Widya Mandala Hall, located within the Widya Mandala Catholic University complex. In the afternoon before the ordination, a vesper service was celebrated at the Cathedral of the Sacred Heart of Jesus in Surabaya. On January 23, 2025, Utomo lead the first Pontifical Mass at Surabaya Cathedral. The motto chosen by Utomo is Diligere sicut Christus dilexit which means "To love as Christ loves".
