= Cathedral of Our Lady of Mount Carmel, Malang =

Catholic church in Indonesia

Coordinates: 7.9684°S 112.6235°E

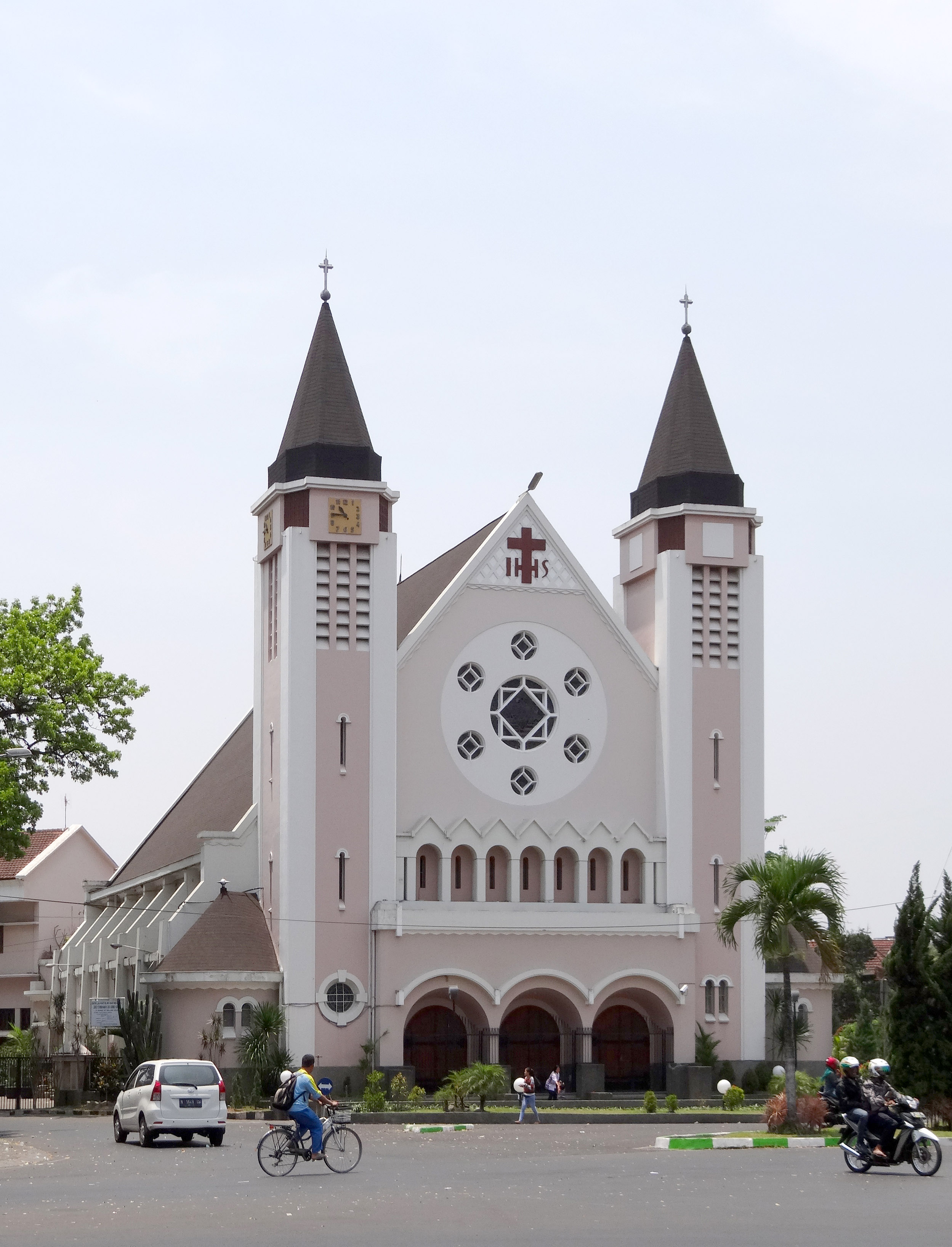
The Cathedral in 2015

The Cathedral of Our Lady of Mount Carmel (Katedral Santa Maria Bunda Karmel) is a Roman Catholic cathedral in Malang, East Java, Indonesia, and seat of the Roman Catholic Diocese of Malang.

The cathedral was built in 1934 in the Art Deco style with some neo-gothic influence by architect H.L.J.M. Estourgie (1886–1964), and is an example of the Dutch colonial architectural heritage in the city. It was originally named for St. Theresia but was renamed in 1961.
