= Albert Hermelink Gentiaras =

Albert Hermelink Gentiaras S.C.I.
- Bishop of Tanjungkarang
- Church: Catholic Church
- Diocese: Diocese of Tanjungkarang
- In office: 27 June 1952 – 18 April 1979
- Predecessor: Prefecture established
- Successor: Andreas Henrisusanta

Orders
- Ordination: 19 July 1925
- Consecration: 29 October 1961 by Gregorio Pietro Agagianian

Personal details
- Born: 5 August 1898 Barger-Compascuum, Drenthe, Netherlands
- Died: 25 February 1983 (aged 84) Jakarta, Indonesia

Albert Hermelink Gentiaras (5 August 1898 – 25 February 1983) was a Dutch clergyman and bishop for the Roman Catholic Diocese of Tanjungkarang.

Gentiaras was born on 5 August 1898 in Barger-Compascuum, Netherlands. He joined the Dehonians and was ordained in 1925. On 27 June 1952, he was appointed bishop for the Roman Catholic Diocese of Tanjungkarang. Gentiaras died in Jakarta on 25 February 1983.
