= Henricus Pidyarto Gunawan =

21st-century Indonesian Catholic bishop

The Most Reverend Henricus Pidyarto Gunawan O.Carm.
- Bishop of Malang
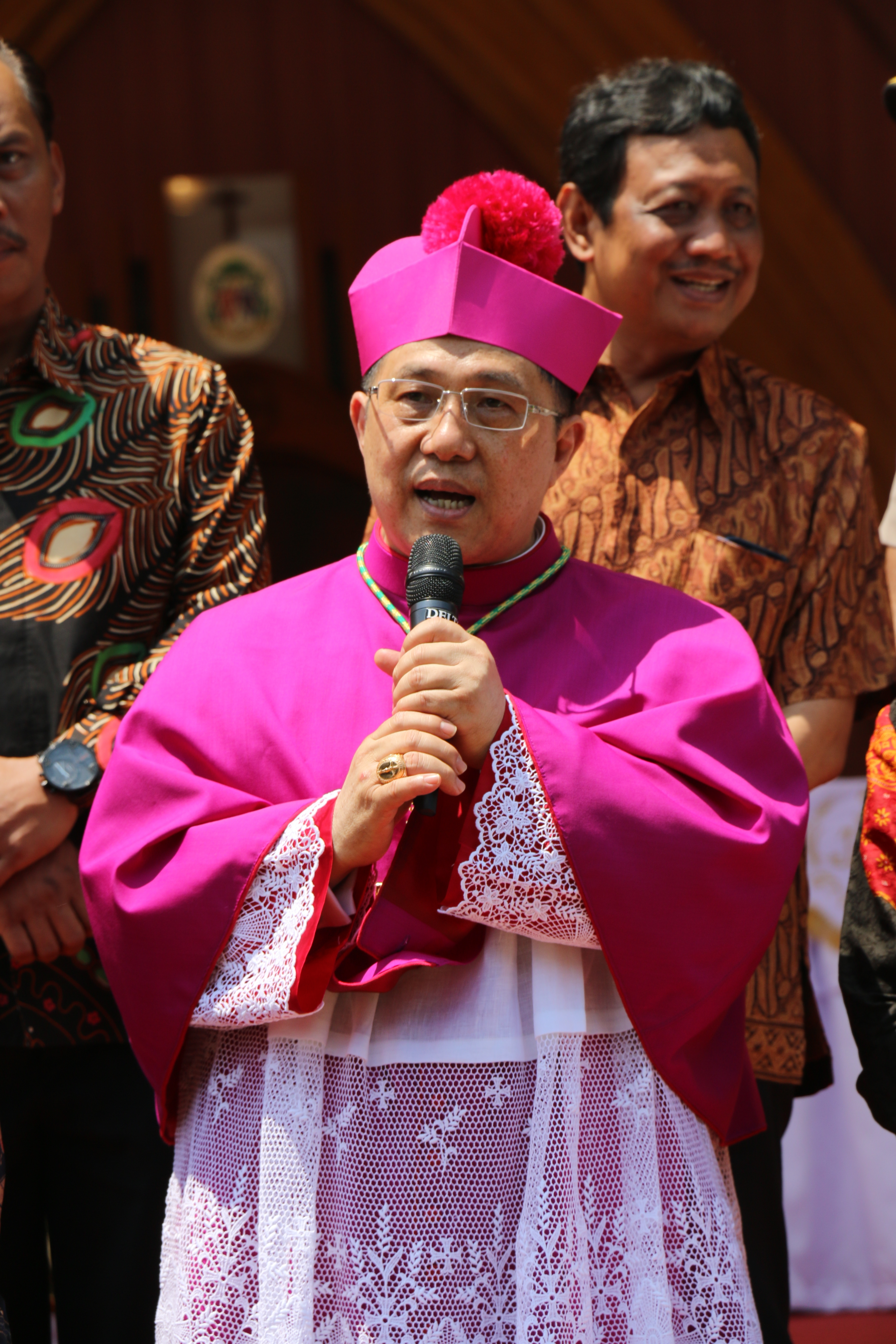
- Gunawan in 2016
- Church: Roman Catholic Church
- Archdiocese: Diocese of Malang
- In office: 2016–
- Predecessor: Herman Joseph Sahadat Pandoyoputro O.Carm.

Orders
- Ordination: 7 February 1982
- Consecration: 3 September 2016 by Ignatius Suharyo Hardjoatmodjo

Personal details
- Born: 13 July 1955 (age 70) Malang, Indonesia
- Motto: Fideliter Praedicare Evangelium Christi (Faithfully Preaching the Gospel of Christ)

Henricus Pidyarto Gunawan O.Carm. (born 13 July 1955) is an Indonesian Roman Catholic bishop.

== Biography ==
Gunawan was born on 13 July 1955 to a Chinese Indonesian family in the city of Malang. Gunawan joined the Order of Carmelites on 15 January 1976, and took his solemn vows as a member on 18 January 1981. On 7 February 1982 he was ordained a priest, by then bishop of Malang Franciscus Xaverius Sudartanta Hadisumarta. He has a brother, Antonius Maria Kristijanto Anton Gunawan, who also became a Carmelite priest. Antonius died on 2 October 2015.

Following his ordination as priest, Gunawan continued his education, studying for his master's degree in the field of Scripture at the Pontifical Bible Institute in Rome and graduated in 1986. In 1990, he completed his doctoral program in Biblical Theology at the Pontifical University of Saint Thomas Aquinas, also in Rome.

Gunawan taught New Testament theology at the Widya Sasana seminary. On March 14, 2007, at a ceremony that took place at the Surya Wacana Seminary Hall next to STFT Widya Sasana, Gunawan along with Prof. DR. Berthold Anton Pareira were honored.

From 2012 until his ordination as bishop, Gunawan was president of the Philosophical and Theological Higher Institute ‘Widya Sasana’.

On 28 June 2016, Pope Francis nominated Gunawan bishop of the diocese of Malang, to replace Herman Pandoyoputro. Gunawan was ordained by Ignatius Suharyo Hardjoatmodjo on 7 February 1982 in Stade Gajayana, Malang, with the co-consecrators being Antonius Subianto Bunjamin and Vincentius Sutikno Wisaksono.
