= Aloysius Josef G. Dibjokarjono =

Indonesian Roman Catholic bishop

- Bishop of Surabaya
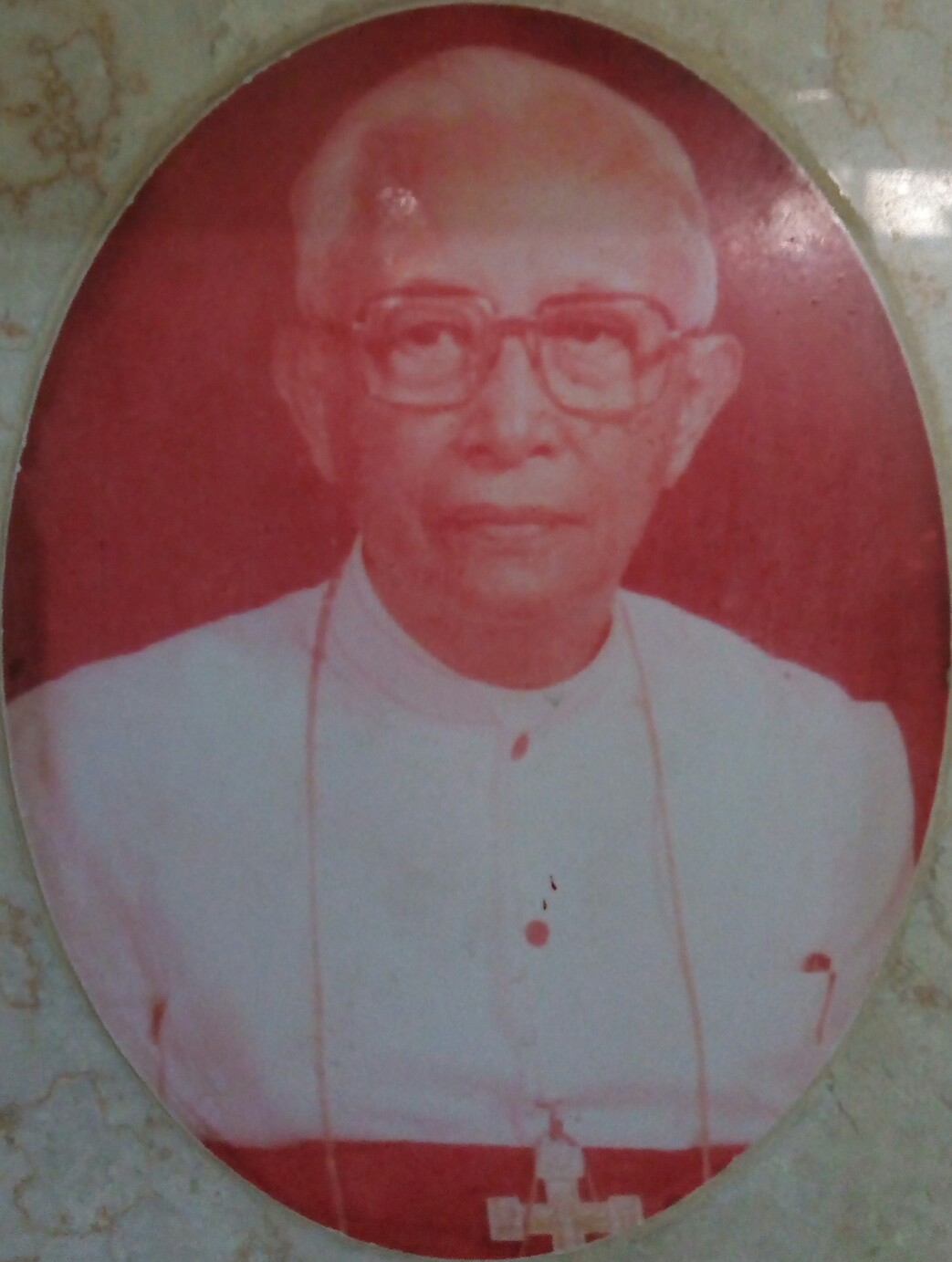
- Church: Catholic Church
- Diocese: Diocese of Surabaya
- In office: 2 April 1982 – 26 March 1994
- Predecessor: Jan Antonius Klooster
- Successor: Johannes Sudiarna Hadiwikarta

Orders
- Ordination: 2 June 1945
- Consecration: 16 December 1982 by Justinus Darmojuwono

Personal details
- Born: 25 December 1917 Wlingi (in present-day Blitar Regency), Kediri Residency, Governorate of East Java, Dutch East Indies, Dutch Empire
- Died: 23 January 2002 (aged 84)

Aloysius Josef G. Dibjokarjono (25 December 1917 – 23 January 2002) was an Indonesian Roman Catholic bishop.

Ordained to the priesthood on 2 June 1945, Dibjokarjono was named bishop of Roman Catholic Diocese of Surabaya, Indonesia on 2 April 1982 and retired on 26 March 1994.
