= Herman Joseph Sahadat Pandoyoputro =

Herman Joseph Sahadat Pandoyoputro O.Carm.
- Bishop of Malang
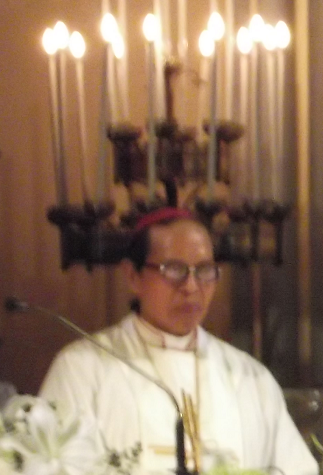
- Pandoyoputro in 2012
- Church: Catholic Church
- Diocese: Diocese of Malang
- In office: 15 May 1989 – 28 June 2016
- Predecessor: Francis Xavier Sudartanta Hadisumarta
- Successor: Henricus Pidyarto Gunawan

Orders
- Ordination: 2 August 1970
- Consecration: 3 September 1989 by Francis Xavier Sudartanta Hadisumarta

Personal details
- Born: 23 April 1939 Kopeng, Kedu Residency, Governorate of Middle Java, Dutch East Indies, Dutch Empire
- Died: 23 September 2016 (aged 77)

Herman Joseph Sahadat Pandoyoputro O.Carm. (23 April 1939 – 23 September 2016) was a Roman Catholic bishop.

Ordained to the priesthood in 1970, Pandoyoputro served as bishop of the Roman Catholic Diocese of Malang, Indonesia from 1989 until 2016
