= Widya Mandala Catholic University =

Private university in Surabaya, Indonesia

- Universitas Katolik Widya Mandala
- Motto: Latin: Non Scholae Sed Vitae Discimus
- Motto in English: We do not learn for school, but for life
- Type: Private university
- Established: 20 September 1960; 65 years ago
- Affiliations: Roman Catholic
- Religious affiliation: Catholic
- President: Ignasius Jonan, Drs., CPA., M.A.
- Vice-president: RD. Yustinus Budi Hermanto, Dr., M.M.
- Provost: Drs. Lanny Hartanti, S.Si, M.Si
- Rector: Drs. Kuncoro Foe, G.Dip.Sc., Ph.D, Apt.
- Undergraduates: 1,090
- Postgraduates: 36
- Location: Dinoyo 42-44, Surabaya, East Java, 60236, Indonesia
- Campus: Urban
- Student newspaper: WIMAGZ (Widya Mandala Magazine)
Colors
The University: Brown
The University Flag: Yellow
Faculty of Teaching and Education
Faculty of Pharmacy
Faculty of Business
Faculty of Engineering
Faculty of Agriculture Technology
Faculty of Psychology
Faculty of Nursing
Faculty of Philosophy
Faculty of Medicine
Faculty of Communication Science
Faculty of Entrepreneurship
Faculty of Vocational
PostGraduates
- Website: Surabaya Campus; Madiun Campus
- Location in Surabaya, Indonesia Widya Mandala Catholic University (Indonesia) Widya Mandala Catholic University (Southeast Asia) Widya Mandala Catholic University (Asia)

Widya Mandala Catholic University (Indonesian: Universitas Katolik Widya Mandala) commonly abbreviated as WMCU or UKWM, is a major private Roman Catholic university in Indonesia, located in the heart of Darmo District in Surabaya, East Java - Indonesia.

Widya Mandala Catholic University is known for Accounting, Food Technology, Chemical Engineering, Pharmacy, Management, and the Doctoral (Ph.D) program in Management. The university is owned by the Roman Catholic Diocese of Surabaya and is being managed by the Diocese under the Widya Mandala Foundation.

== History ==
The idea of establishing a Catholic Higher Education Foundation started around 1914-1919. At that time, many HBS (Hogere Burger School) graduates were unable to continue their higher education to the Netherlands, due to circumstances regarding the first world war and the resultant transportation barriers to Europe.

During the 1950s, in what became known as the "Catholic College Awakening Era" after the establishment of several Catholic universities in Indonesian cities, Mgr. J. Klooster, CM as the Bishop of Surabaya founded the Widya Mandala Foundation.

Widya Mandala comes from the ancient Javanese language; Mandala means building or place in the sense not only physical and Widya means scholar. So Widya Mandala can be interpreted as a place of education for wise and successful people (scholars). Some people also simplify the meaning of Widya Mandala as a place or container of knowledge.

September 20, 1960 was designated as the anniversary of Widya Mandala Catholic University Surabaya (UKWMS). When it was founded, UKWMS was located at Jalan Dr. Soetomo, Surabaya. Now there are ten faculties, postgraduate programs (S2 and S3), as well as a Secretarial Academy (D3). The activities of the Widya Mandala Catholic University in Surabaya are outlined in the form of the Tri Dharma of Higher Education which consists of Education and Teaching, Research, and Community Service.

As one of the oldest private universities in Surabaya, UKWMS has four campus buildings to support the teaching and learning process. The main campus is located on Jalan Dinoyo 42, inhabited by the Business Faculty, the Communication Science Faculty and the Agricultural Technology Faculty. The second campus is located on Jalan Kalijudan 38, inhabited by the Faculty of Engineering and the Faculty of Teacher Training & Education. The third campus is located on Jalan Dinoyo 48, inhabited by the Postgraduate Program. The newest campus building which was inaugurated in 2013 is the Integrated and Comprehensive Health Sciences Campus and is located on Jalan Kalisari Selatan 7 in the Pakuwon City complex. Carrying integrated learning methods across health sciences, on this fourth campus there are the Faculty of Pharmacy, the Faculty of Psychology, the Faculty of Nursing, the Faculty of Philosophy, and the Faculty of Medicine.

== Locations ==
Widya Mandala Catholic University has four campuses in the city of Surabaya and one in Madiun, Indonesia.

- The first campus in Dinoyo hosts the Faculty of Business, Faculty of Entrepreneurship, Faculty of Agricultural Technology, Faculty of Arts in Communication, and the Secretary Academy (Office Administration).
- The second campus in Kalijudan is also equipped with sports facilities such as basketball and tennis courts. The Kalijudan campus hosts the Faculty of Engineering, and the Faculty of Teaching and Education.
- The third campus in Pakuwon City was established in 2013. It is located in a residential complex that is projected to be an independent city in the East Surabaya area. The campus at Pakuwon City Laguna was built with the concept of an Integrated Health Sciences Campus, which includes mental and physical health. Pakuwon campus hosts the Faculty of Medicine, Faculty of Pharmacy, Faculty of Nursing, Faculty of Psychology, and Faculty of Philosophy in one integrated campus.
- The Graha Widya Mandala campus, located in the same location as the Dinoyo Campus, is equipped with complete facilities and is convenient for use by the Widya Mandala Secretarial Academy. Graha Widya Mandala campus offers a Master Program in Management, a Master Program in Accounting, a Master Program in English Education, a Ph.D Program in Management, and a Language Institute.
- The campus in Madiun is an integration of Widya Mandala Madiun Catholic University in Madiun City. Madiun campus hosts the Programs outside the main campus (Study Program Outside the Main Campus (PSKDU), such Guidance and Counseling, Indonesian Language Education, Mathematics Education, English Literature, Biology, Industrial Engineering, Management, Accounting, Psychology, and Diploma (D-III) in Pharmacy.

== Faculties and departments ==
Diplomas (D-III) (Faculty of Vocational):

1. Diploma Program (D-III) in Accounting
2. Diploma Program (D-III) Secretary Academy (Office Administration)

UnderGraduates:

- Faculty of Business (Member of AACSB International)
1. Department of Accounting
2. Department of Management
3. International Business Management (IBM) Program
4. IBM Solbridge Joint Degree with the SolBridge International School of Business
5. International Business Accounting (IBAcc) Program
6. Digital Business Management (DBM) Program
- Faculty of Teaching and Education
1. Department of Physics Education
2. Department of English Education
3. Department of Childhood Education Studies
- Faculty of Pharmacy
1. Department of Pharmacy
2. Department of "Apoteker" Pharmacist (Apt.) specialization degree
- Faculty of Engineering
1. Department of Chemical Engineering
2. Department of Double Degree of Chemical Engineering is double-degree program with the National Taiwan University of Science and Technology
3. Department of Electrical Engineering
4. Department of Industrial Engineering
- Faculty of Agricultural Technology
1. Department of Food Technology
- Faculty of Medicine
1. Department of Medicine with a Medical Doctor (dr.) specialization degree
2. Department of Doctor Profession
- Faculty of Psychology
1. Department of Psychology
- Faculty of Nursing
1. Department of Nursing
2. Department of Ners (Ns.) specialization degree
- Faculty of Arts in Communication
1. Department of Communication Sciences
- Faculty of Philosophy
1. Department of Philosophy
- Faculty of Entrepreneurship
1. Department of Entrepreneurship

PostGraduates:

1. Master Program in Management
2. Master Program in Accounting
3. Master Program in English Education
4. Master Program in Chemical Engineering
5. Ph.D Program in Management

== Gallery ==
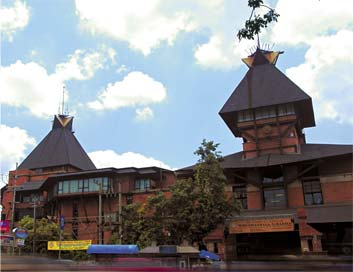
1st campus, Jl. Dinoyo No. 42-44, Surabaya

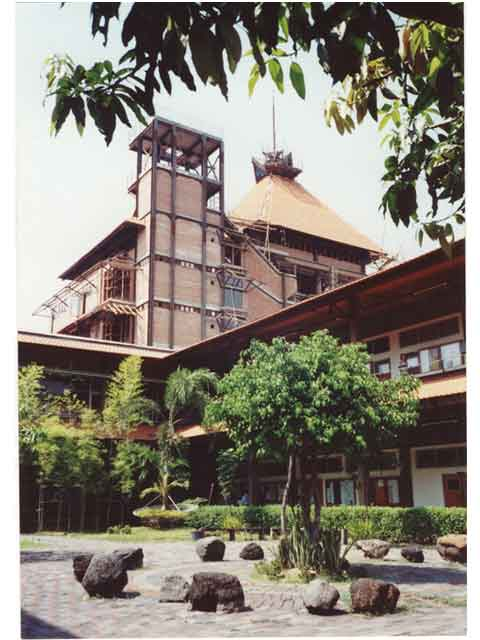
2nd campus, Jl. Kalijudan No. 37, Surabaya

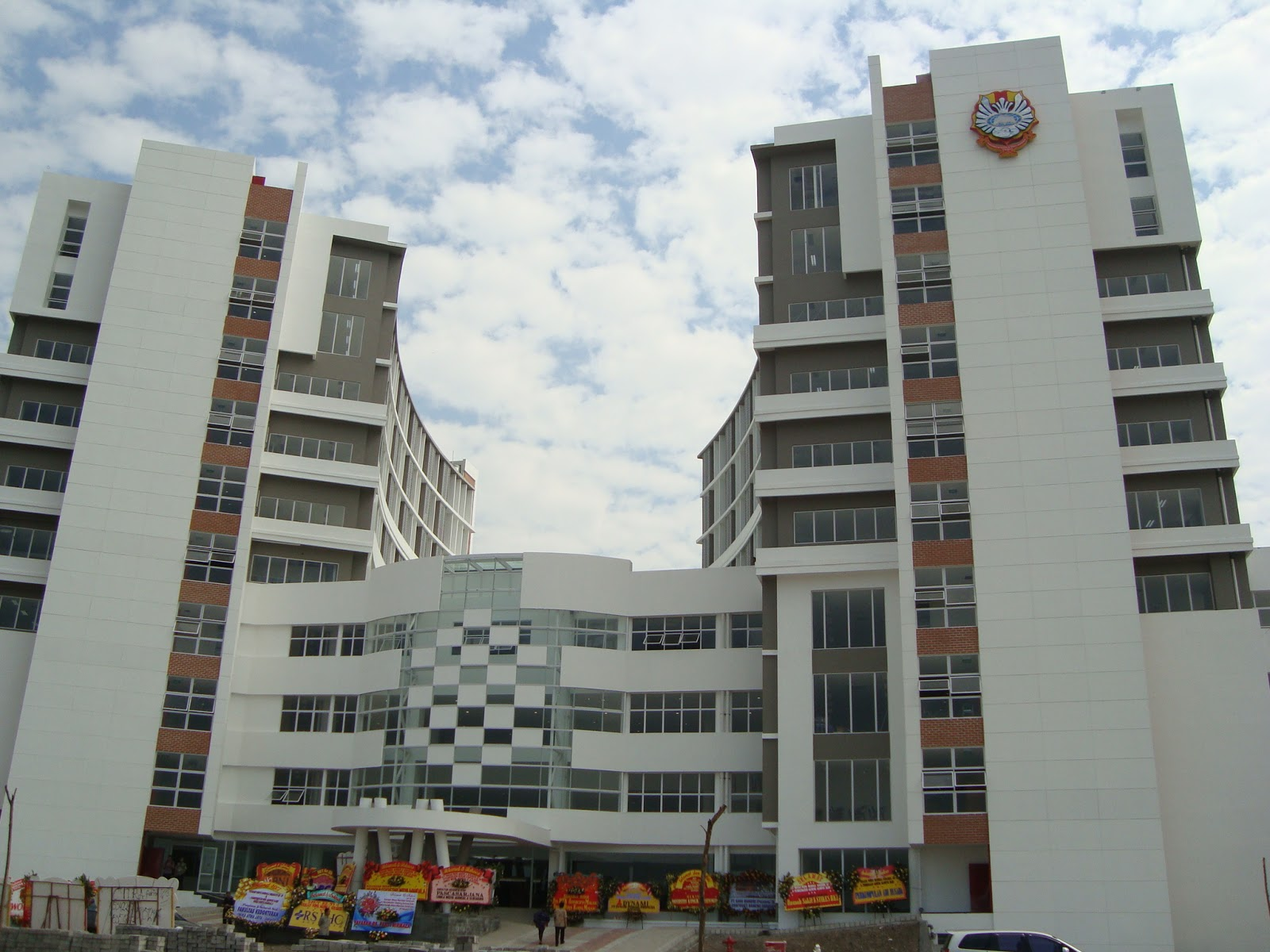
3rd campus, Jl. Kalisari Selatan No. 01, Pakuwon City, Surabaya

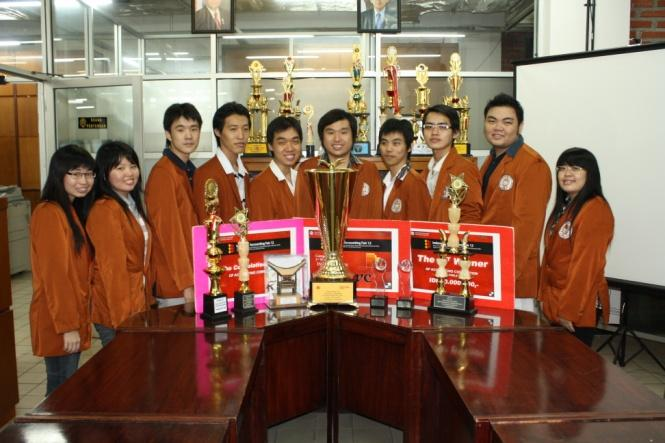
Widya Mandala Catholic University students received awards

== See also ==
- Association of Christian Universities and Colleges in Asia (ACUCA)
