= Hilarius Moa Nurak =

Indonesian Roman Catholic bishop (1943–2016)

Hilarius Moa Nurak SVD
- Bishop of Pangkal-Pinang
- Church: Catholic Church
- Diocese: Diocese of Pangkal-Pinang
- In office: 30 March 1987 – 29 April 2016
- Predecessor: Nicolaas van der Westen
- Successor: Adrianus Sunarko

Orders
- Ordination: 2 August 1972
- Consecration: 2 August 1987 by Darius Nggawa

Personal details
- Born: 21 February 1943 Waikabubak, Timor and Dependencies Residency, Occupied Dutch East Indies, Empire of Japan
- Died: 29 April 2016 (aged 73)

Hilarius Moa Nurak (21 February 1943 – 29 April 2016) was a Roman Catholic bishop.

Ordained to the priesthood in 1972, Moa Nurak served as bishop of the Roman Catholic Diocese of Pangkal Pinang, Indonesia, from 1987 until his death in 2016.
