= Diocese of Pangkal-Pinang =

Roman Catholic diocese in Bangka Belitung Islands, Indonesia

Diocese of Pangkal-Pinang Dioecesis Pangkalpinangensis Keuskupan Pangkal Pinang 槟港天主教教区

catholic
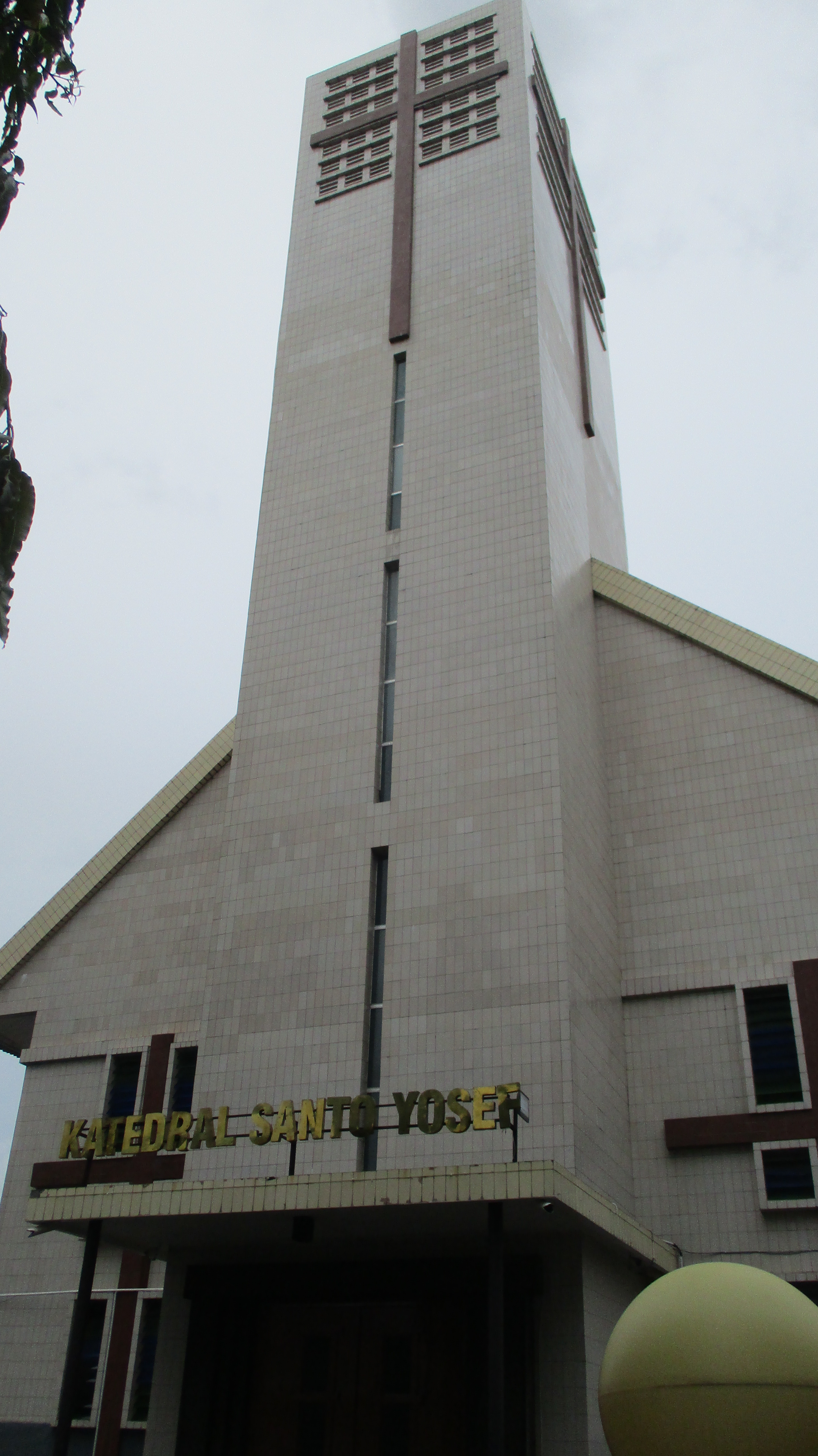
- Katedral Santo Yosep

Location
- Country: Indonesia
- Ecclesiastical province: Palembang
- Metropolitan: Palembang
- Headquarters: Pangkal Pinang
- Coordinates: 2°07′50″S 106°07′44″E

Statistics
- Area: 27,021 km^{2} (10,433 sq mi)
- Population: Total; Catholics: (as of 2019); 3,495,000; 55,421 (1.6%)

Information
- Rite: Latin Rite
- Established: December 27, 1923
- Cathedral: Cathedral of St Joseph in Pangkal Pinang

Current leadership
- Pope: Leo XIV
- Bishop: Adrianus Sunarko O.F.M.
- Metropolitan Archbishop: Yohanes Harun Yuwono

Website
- keuskupan-pangkal-pinang.business.site

The Roman Catholic Diocese of Pangkal-Pinang (Latin: Pangkalpinangen(sis)) is a diocese in the ecclesiastical province of the metropolitan Archdiocese of Palembang on Bangka Belitung Islands in Indonesia, yet depends on the missionary Congregation for the Evangelization of Peoples.

Its cathedral episcopal see is Katedral Santo Yosep, dedicated to Saint Joseph, in the city of Pangkal-Pinang, on Bangka Island.

== History ==
- 27 December 1923: Established as the Apostolic Prefecture of Bangka e Biliton, on territory split off from the Apostolic Prefecture of Sumatra
- 8 February 1951: Promoted and renamed after its see as the Apostolic Vicariate of Pangkal-Pinang
- 3 January 1961: Promoted as Diocese of Pangkal-Pinang

== Statistics ==
As per 2018, it pastorally served 55,421 Catholics (1.6% of 3,495,000 total) on 27,021 km^{2} in 17 parishes, 2 missions, with 77 priests (56 diocesan, 21 religious), 111 lay religious (27 brothers, 84 sisters), and 26 seminarians.

== Ordinaries ==
(all Roman Rite, so far members of missionary congregations)

Apostolic Prefects of Bangka e Biliton

- Mgr Teodosio Herckenrath, Picpus Fathers, SS.CC. born Netherlands, the colonial homeland) (18 January 1924 – death 1928)
- Mgr Vito Bouma, SS.CC. (born Netherlands) (29 May 1928 – 1945)
- Mgr Van Soest, SS.CC. (born Netherlands) (1946-1951) as Apostolic Administrator vicar Apostolic Prefects of Bangka, Belitung and Riau

Apostolic Vicar of Pangkal-Pinang

- Nicolas Pierre van der Westen, SS.CC. (born Netherlands) (8 February 1951 – 3 January 1961 see below), Titular Bishop of Bladia (1951.02.08 – 1961.01.03)

Suffragan Bishops of Pangkal-Pinang

- Nicolas Pierre van der Westen, SS.CC. (see above 3 January 1961 – retired 11 November 1978), died 1982
- Mgr Rolf Reichenbach, SS.CC. (born in Cologne, in 1931, death in 2004) 1979-1987 as Apostolic Administrator of Diocese of Pangkalpinang
- Mgr Hilarius Moa Nurak, Divine Word Missionaries (S.V.D.) (born Indonesia) (30 March 1987 – death 29 April 2016)
- Mgr Yohanes Harun Yuwono Pr. (29 April 2016 – 28 June 2017) as Apostolic Administrator of Diocese of Pangkalpinang
- Mgr Adrianus Sunarko, O.F.M. (born Papua) (28 June 2017 - ...), no previous prelature.

== See also ==
- List of Catholic dioceses in Indonesia
