= Diocese of Manokwari–Sorong =

Roman Catholic diocese on Papua, Indonesia

Diocese of Manokwari–Sorong Dioecesis Manokvariensis Sorongensis Keuskupan Manokwari-Sorong

Location
- Country: Indonesia
- Ecclesiastical province: Merauke
- Metropolitan: Merauke

Statistics
- Area: 111,835 km^{2} (43,180 sq mi)
- Population: Total; Catholics: (as of 2002); 556,583; 54,567 (9.8%)

Information
- Rite: Latin Rite
- Cathedral: Cathedral of Christ the King in Sorong

Current leadership
- Pope: Leo XIV
- Bishop: Datus Hilarion Lega
- Metropolitan Archbishop: Petrus Canisius Mandagi

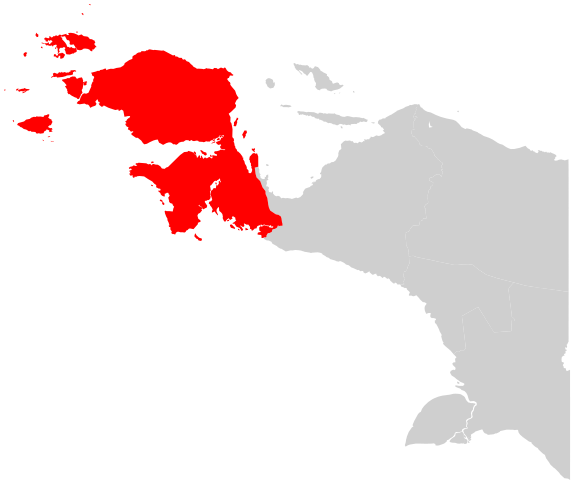
Location of the Diocese of Manokwari-Sorong in the Ecclesiastical Province of Merauke

The Roman Catholic Diocese of Manokwari–Sorong (Latin: Manokvariensis Sorongen(sis)) is a diocese located in the cities of Manokwari and Sorong in the ecclesiastical province of Merauke in Indonesia.

== History ==
- 19 December 1959: Established as the Apostolic Prefecture of Manokwari from the Apostolic Vicariate of Hollandia
- 15 November 1966: Promoted as Diocese of Manokwari
- 14 May 1974: Renamed as Diocese of Manokwari – Sorong

== Leadership ==
- Bishops of Manokwari–Sorong (Roman rite)
  - Bishop Datus Hilarion Lega (30 June 2003 – present)
  - Bishop Francis Xavier Sudartanta Hadisumarta, O. Carm. (5 May 1988 – 30 June 2003)
  - Bishop Petrus Malachias van Diepen, O.S.A. (14 May 1974 – 5 May 1988)
- Bishops of Manokwari (Roman Rite)
  - Bishop Petrus Malachias van Diepen, O.S.A. (15 November 1966 – 14 May 1974)
- Prefects Apostolic of Manokwari (Roman Rite)
  - Fr. Petrus Malachias van Diepen, O.S.A. (later Bishop) (12 February 1960 – 15 November 1966)
