= Diocese of Malang =

Catholic diocese in East Java, Indonesia

Coordinates: 7.968772°S 112.624201°E

Diocese of Malang Dioecesis Malangensis Keuskupan Malang

Location
- Country: Indonesia
- Ecclesiastical province: Semarang
- Deaneries: 7
- Headquarters: Jalan Besar Ijen, Malang, East Java

Statistics
- Area: 24,409 km^{2} (9,424 sq mi)
- Population: Total; Catholics: (as of 2004); 14,829,884; 88,255 (0.6%)
- Parishes: 29

Information
- Denomination: Catholic Church
- Sui iuris church: Latin Church
- Rite: Roman Rite
- Cathedral: Cathedral of Our Lady of Mount Carmel in Malang

Current leadership
- Pope: Leo XIV
- Bishop: Henricus Pidyarto Gunawan, O. Carm.
- Metropolitan Archbishop: Mgr. Robertus Rubiyatmoko
- Vicar General: Rd Alfonsus Tjatur Raharso
- Episcopal Vicars: RP Ignatius Joko Purnomo O. Carm

Website
- Website of the Diocese

The Diocese of Malang (Latin: Malangen(sis)) is a Latin Church diocese of the Catholic Church located in the city of Malang in the ecclesiastical province of the Archdiocese of Semarang in Indonesia.

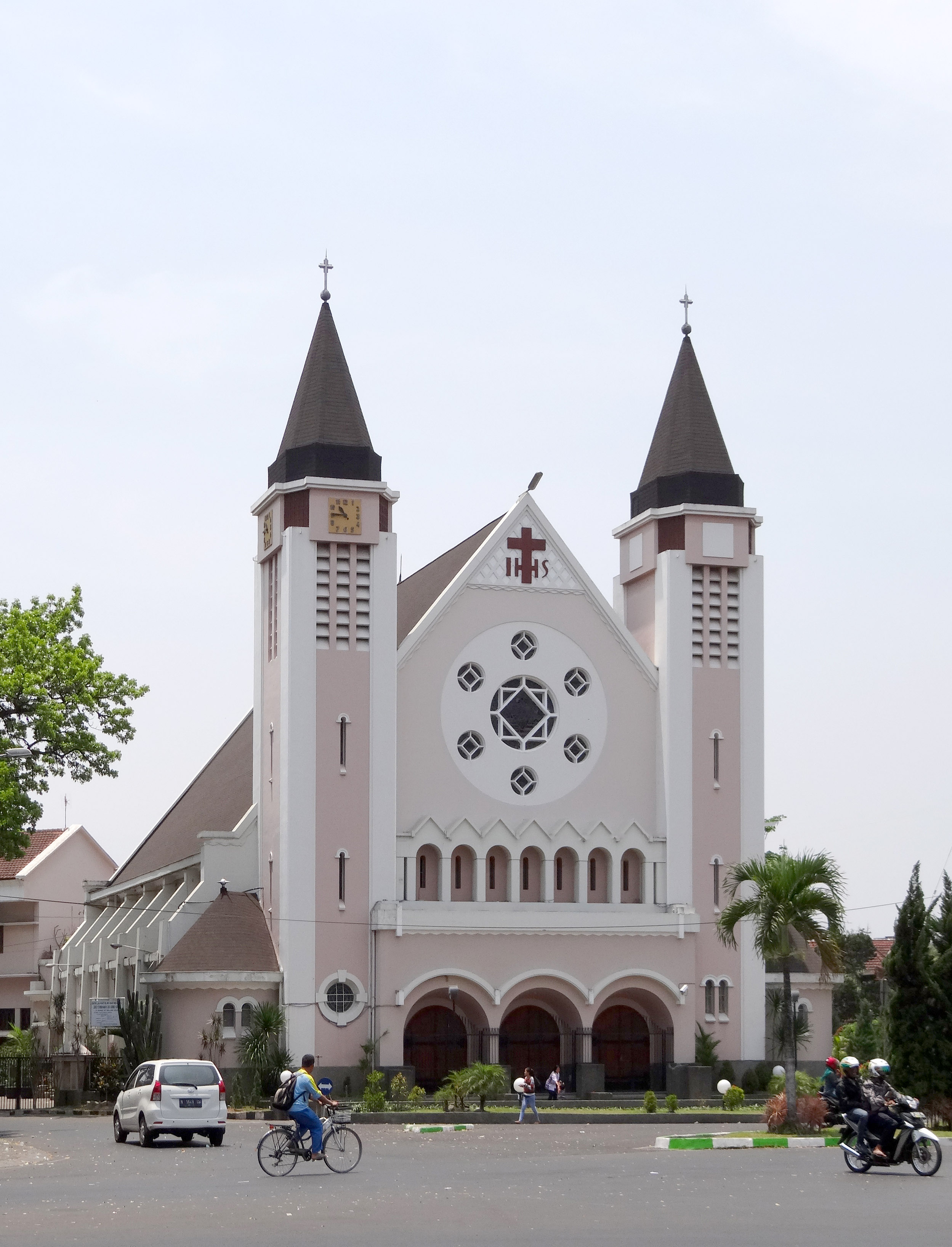
The Cathedral

== History ==
- April 27, 1927: Established as Apostolic Prefecture of Malang, on territory split off from the then Apostolic Vicariate of Batavia
- March 15, 1939: Promoted as Apostolic Vicariate of Malang
- January 3, 1961: Promoted as Diocese of Malang

== Leadership ==
- Bishops of Malang
  - Bishop Henricus Pidyarto Gunawan, O. Carm. (June 28, 2016 – present)
  - Bishop Herman Joseph Sahadat Pandoyoputro, O. Carm. (May 15, 1989 – June 28, 2016)
  - Bishop Francis Xavier Sudartanta Hadisumarta, O. Carm. (March 1, 1973 – May 5, 1988)
  - Bishop Antoine Everardo Giovanni Albers, O. Carm. (January 3, 1961 – March 1, 1973)
- Vicars Apostolic of Malang (Roman Rite)
  - Bishop Antoine Everardo Giovanni Albers, O. Carm. (March 15, 1939 – January 3, 1961)
- Prefects Apostolic of Malang (Roman Rite)
  - Fr. Antoine Everardo Giovanni Albers, O. Carm. (later Bishop) (January 28, 1935 – March 15, 1939)
  - Fr. Clemente van der Pas, O. Carm. (July 19, 1927 – 1935)
