= Adrianus Sunarko =

21st-century Indonesian Catholic bishop

Adrianus Sunarko O.F.M.
- Bishop of the Diocese of Pangkalpinang
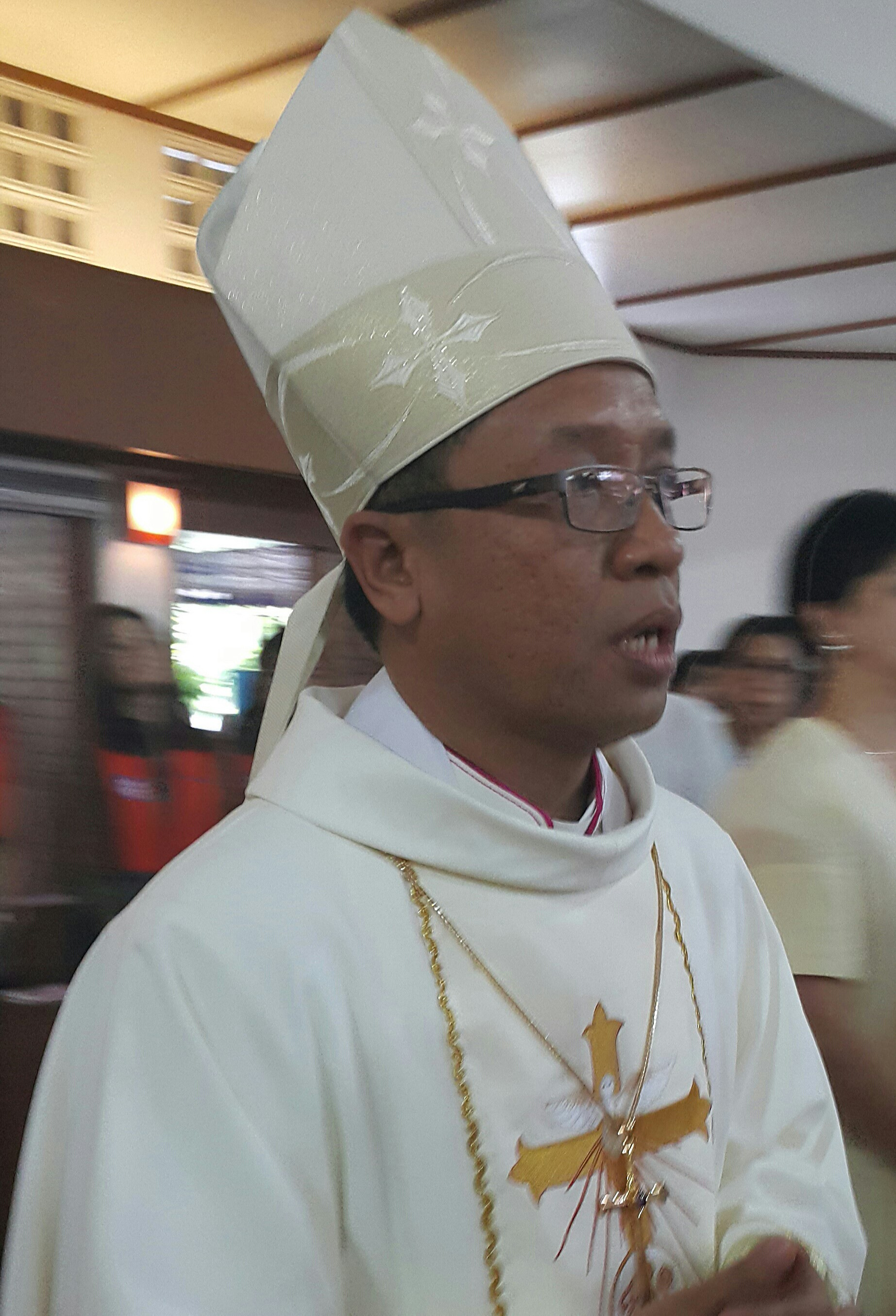
- Sunarko in 2017
- Church: Roman Catholic Church
- Diocese: Diocese of Pangkalpinang
- In office: 2017–
- Predecessor: Hilarius Moa Nurak S.V.D.
- Previous post: Franciscan priest

Orders
- Ordination: 8 July 1995 by Julius Darmaatmadja S.J.
- Consecration: 23 September 2017 by Aloysius Sudarso S.C.J.
- Rank: Bishop

Personal details
- Born: 7 December 1966 (age 59) Merauke, Papua, Indonesia
- Motto: Lætentur insulæ multæ (Let many lands rejoice)
- Coat of arms

Adrianus Sunarko O.F.M. (born 7 December 1966) is an Indonesian Roman Catholic bishop.

== Biography ==
Although born in the Indonesian province of Papua, Sunarko's family are Javanese immigrants from Bantul, Yogyakarta.

Sunarko was educated at St. Peter Canisius Middle Seminary, in the town of Mertoyudan in Magelang Regency from 1982 to 1987. After completing his studies at the Mertoyudan Seminary, he was accepted as a candidate member of the Franciscans and underwent training as a novitiate. As part of his formation, Sunarko studied philosophy at STF Driyakarya in Jakarta. He resumed his theological studies at the Wedabhakti Pontifical Theological Faculty, Sanata Dharma University, after completing his pastoral orientation year.

On 15 August 1994, Sunarko took his solemn vows as a member of the Order of Friars Minor. The following year on 8 July 1995, he was ordained a priest by then-Cardinal Julius Darmaatmadja.

After his ordination Sunarko was the provincial head of the Franciscan friars in Indonesia, and served as a priest in the Diocese of Jayapura.

On 28 June 2017 it was announced that Sunarko had been nominated as the bishop of Pangkalpinang, succeeding Hilarius Moa Nurak who had died in April of the previous year. On 23 September of that year, Sunarko was ordained bishop of the diocese of Pangkalpinang by archbishop of Palembang, Aloysius Sudarso.
