= Francis Xavier Sudartanta Hadisumarta =

Indonesian bishop (1932–2022)

Francis Xavier Sudartanta Hadisumarta O. Carm.
- Bishop of Manokwari–Sorong
- Church: Catholic Church
- Diocese: Diocese of Manokwari–Sorong
- In office: 5 May 1988 – 30 June 2003
- Predecessor: Petrus Malachias van Diepen
- Successor: Hilarion Datus Lega
- Previous post: Bishop of Malang (1973-1988)

Orders
- Ordination: 12 June 1959
- Consecration: 16 July 1973 by Justinus Darmojuwono

Personal details
- Born: 13 December 1932 Ambarawa, Semarang Residency, Governorate of Middle Java, Dutch East Indies, Dutch Empire
- Died: 12 February 2022 (aged 89) Jakarta, Indonesia

Francis Xavier Sudartanta Hadisumarta O. Carm. (13 December 1932 – 12 February 2022) was an Indonesian Roman Catholic bishop.

== Biography ==
Hadisumarta was born in the Dutch East Indies and was ordained to the priesthood in 1959. He served as bishop of the Roman Catholic Diocese of Malang, Indonesia, from 1973 to 1988 and as bishop of the Roman Catholic Diocese of Manokwari-Sorong, Indonesia, from 1988 until his resignation in 2003.

He died on 12 February 2022, at the age of 89.
