= Diocese of Tanjungkarang =

Diocese of the Catholic Church

Coordinates: 5.4500°S 105.2670°E

Diocese of Tanjungkarang Dioecesis Tangiungkaranganus Keuskupan Tanjungkarang

Location
- Country: Indonesia
- Ecclesiastical province: Palembang
- Metropolitan: Palembang

Statistics
- Area: 36,000 km^{2} (14,000 sq mi)
- Population: Total; Catholics: (as of 2010); 7,269,000; 75,789 (1%)

Information
- Rite: Latin Rite
- Cathedral: Cathedral of Christ the King in Tanjung Karang

Current leadership
- Pope: Leo XIV
- Bishop: Vinsensius Setiawan Triatmojo
- Metropolitan Archbishop: Yohanes Harun Yuwono

Website
- Website of the Diocese

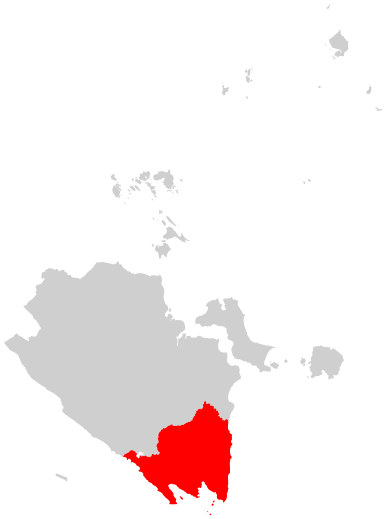
Location of the Diocese of Tanjungkarang in the Ecclesiastical Province of Palembang.

The Roman Catholic Diocese of Tanjungkarang (Latin: Tangiungkarangan(us)) is a diocese located in the city of Tanjungkarang in the ecclesiastical province of Palembang in Indonesia.

== History ==
- June 19, 1952: Established as the Apostolic Prefecture of Tandjung-Karang from the Apostolic Vicariate of Palembang
- January 3, 1961: Promoted as Diocese of Tandjung-Karang
- August 22, 1973: Renamed as Diocese of Tanjungkarang

== Leadership ==
- Bishops of Tanjungkarang (Roman rite)
  - Bishop Yohanes Harun Yuwono (elected 19 July 2013)
  - Bishop Andreas Henrisusanta, S.C.I. (April 18, 1979 – July 6, 2012)
  - Bishop Albert Hermelink Gentiaras, S.C.I. (August 22, 1973 – April 18, 1979)
- Bishops of Tandjung-Karang (Roman Rite)
  - Bishop Albert Hermelink Gentiaras, S.C.I. (January 3, 1961 – August 22, 1973)
- Prefects Apostolic of Tandjung-Karang (Roman Rite)
  - Fr. Albert Hermelink Gentiaras, S.C.I. (later Bishop) (June 27, 1952 – January 3, 1961)
