= Diocese of Surabaya =

Roman Catholic diocese in East Java, Indonesia

Diocese of Surabaya Dioecesis Surabayana Keuskupan Surabaya
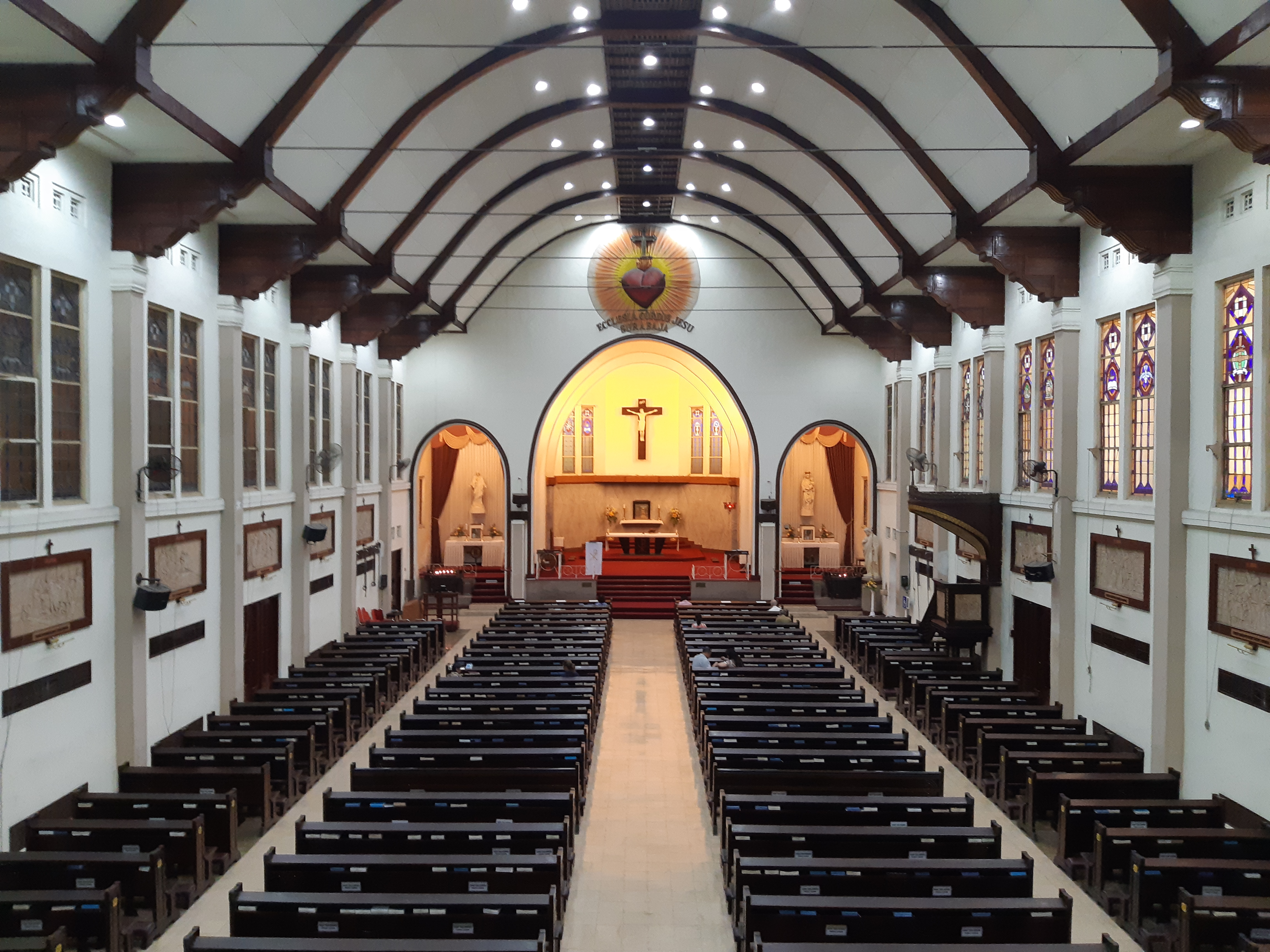
- Cathedral of the Sacred Heart of Jesus

Location
- Country: Indonesia
- Metropolitan: Semarang

Statistics
- Area: 24,461 km^{2} (9,444 sq mi)
- Population: Total; Catholics: (as of 2004); 3,400,000; 150,457 (4.4%)
- Parishes: 44

Information
- Denomination: Catholic
- Sui iuris church: Latin Church
- Rite: Roman Rite
- Established: 1928 (As Apostolic Prefecture of Surabaia); 1961 (As Diocese of Surabaia)
- Cathedral: Cathedral of the Sacred Heart of Jesus
- Secular priests: 170 (Total); 111 (Diocesan) (3 Diocesan Deacons)

Current leadership
- Pope: Leo XIV
- Bishop: Agustinus Tri Budi Utomo
- Metropolitan Archbishop: Robertus Rubiyatmoko

Map

Website
- Official website

The Roman Catholic Diocese of Surabaya (Indonesian: Keuskupan Surabaya) (Latin: Dioecesis Surabayana) is a suffragan Latin diocese, located on Java island, in Indonesia and administers parishes in the northern and western parts of East Java province.

Its episcopal see is at the Cathedral of the Sacred Heart of Jesus in Surabaya.

The diocese is headed by bishop Agustinus Tri Budi Utomo, who the bishop, Mgr. Vincentius Sutikno Wisaksono, preceded.

== History ==
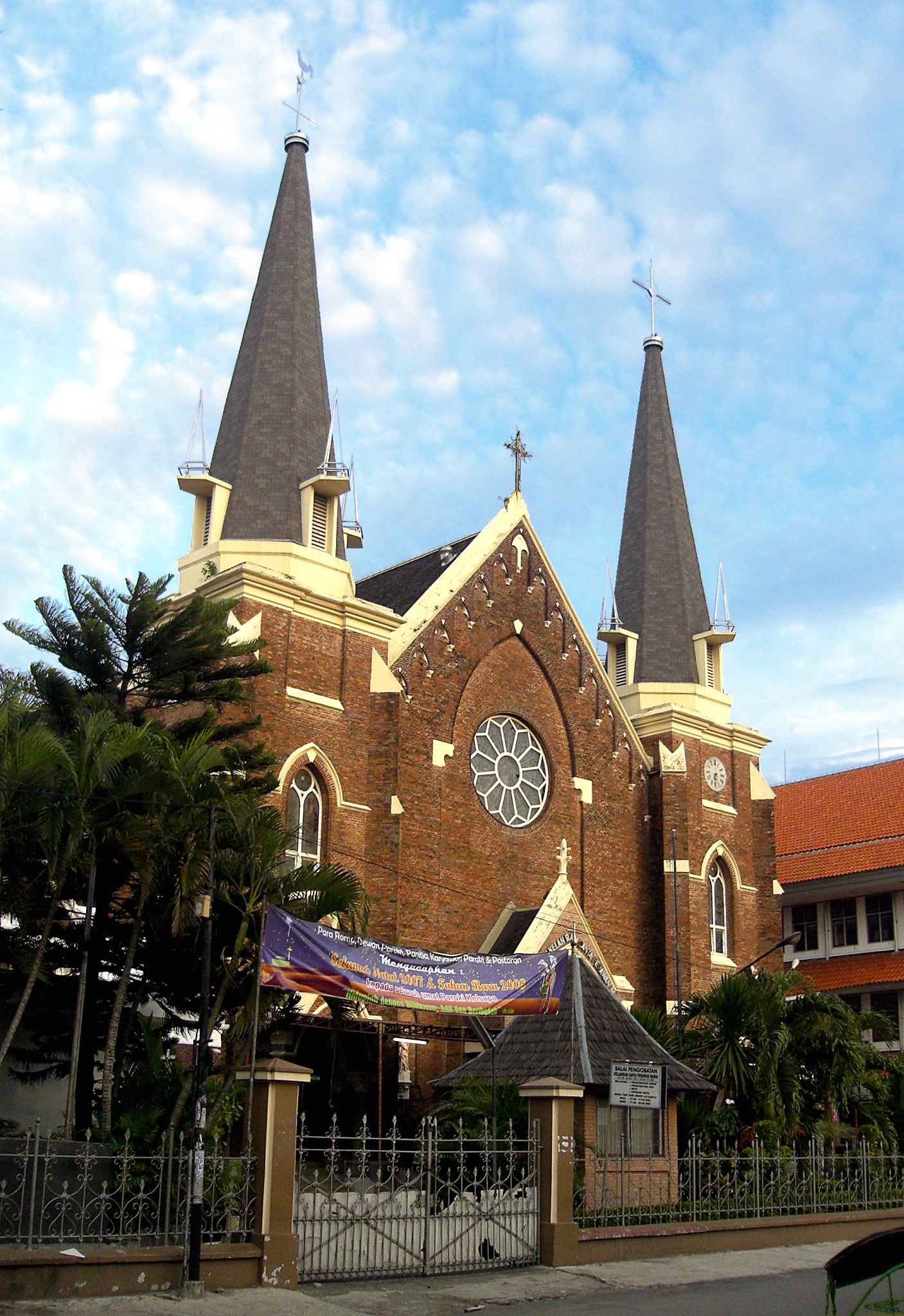
Gereja Santa Perawan Maria, the oldest Catholic church in Surabaya

- Established on February 15, 1928 as the Apostolic Prefecture of Surabaia, on territory split off from the then Apostolic Vicariate of Batavia (now Metropolitan Archdiocese of Jakarta)
- October 16, 1941: Promoted as Apostolic Vicariate of Surabaia, still a missionary pre-diocesan jurisdiction but entitled to a titular bishop.
- Promoted on January 3, 1961 as Diocese of Surabaia
- August 22, 1973: Renamed as Diocese of Surabaya

== Ordinaries ==
Apostolic Prefects of Surabaya

- Teofilo Emilio de Backere, (C.M.) (1928.06.06 – 1937)
- Michele Verhoeks, C.M. (1937.10.22 – 1941.10.16)

Apostolic Vicars of Surabaya

- Michele Verhoeks, C.M. (1941.10.16 – death 1952.05.08), Titular Bishop of Eleutheropolis in Palæstina (1941.10.16 – 1952.05.08)
- Jan Antonius Klooster, C.M. (1953.02.19 – 1961.01.03)

Suffragan Bishops of Surabaya

- Jan Antonius Klooster, C.M. (see above January 3, 1961 – 1982), Titular Bishop of Germanicopolis (1961.01.03 – 1982)
- Aloysius Josef G. Dibjokarjono (April 2, 1982 – March 26, 1994)
- Johannes Sudiarna Hadiwikarta (March 26, 1994 – death December 13, 2003)
- Vincentius Sutikno Wisaksono (April 3, 2007 – August 10, 2023)
- Agustinus Tri Budi Utomo (January 22, 2025 – present)

== Sources and External Links ==
- GCatholic.org, with incumbent biography links
- Catholic Hierarchy
