= Andreas Henrisusanta =

Andreas Suwiyata Henrisusanta S.C.I.
- Bishop of Tanjungkarang
- Native name: Andreas Soewijata Henrisoesanta
- Church: Catholic Church
- Diocese: Diocese of Tanjungkarang
- In office: 18 April 1979 – 6 July 2012
- Predecessor: Albert Hermelink Gentiaras
- Successor: Yohanes Harun Yuwono
- Previous posts: Titular Bishop of Ubaba (1975-1979); Auxiliary Bishop of Tanjungkarang (1975-1979)

Orders
- Ordination: 2 July 1961
- Consecration: 11 February 1976 by Justinus Darmojuwono

Personal details
- Born: 7 June 1935 Wonosari, Djokjakarta Residency, Vorstenlanden, Dutch East Indies, Dutch Empire
- Died: 10 March 2016 (aged 80)

Andreas Henrisusanta, S.C.I. (7 June 1935 – 10 March 2016) was an Indonesian prelate of the Roman Catholic Church who served as bishop of the Diocese of Tanjungkarang, Indonesia from 1979 to 2012.

== Biography ==
Born in Wonosari, in present-day Indonesia, Henrisusanta joined to the Dehonians Fathers and was ordained to the priesthood for this Congregation on 2 July 1961. On 29 August 1975, he was appointed titular bishop of Ubaba and auxiliary of the Roman Catholic Diocese of Tanjungkarang, Indonesia, and was ordained on 11 February 1976. Three years later, on 18 April 1979, he became the bishop ordinary of the same diocese. He retired on 6 July 2012.
