= Archdiocese of Palembang =

Roman Catholic archdiocese in South Sumatra, Indonesia

Archdiocese of Palembang Archidioecesis Palembangensis Keuskupan Agung Palembang
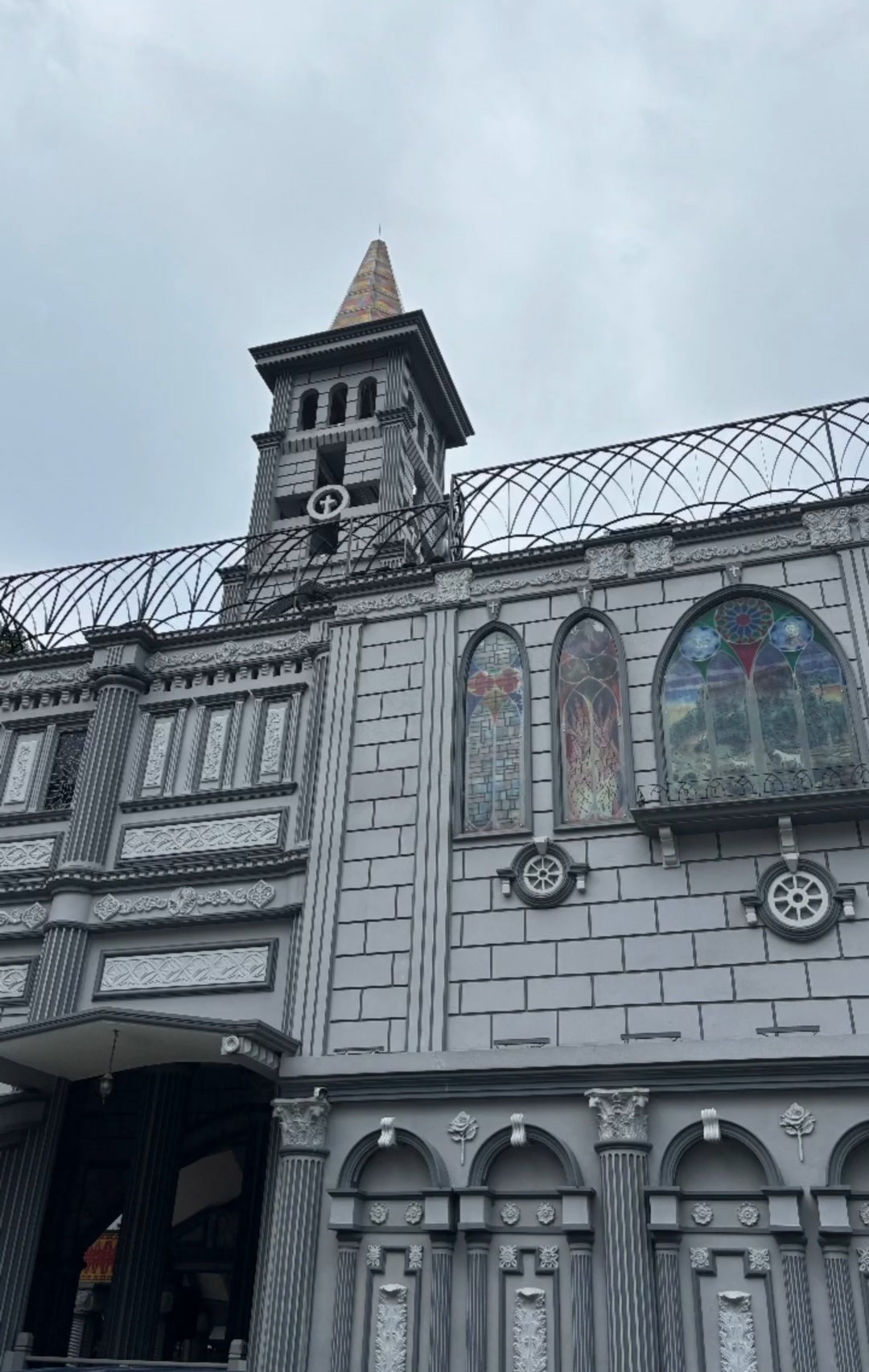
- Cathedral of St. Mary

Location
- Country: Indonesia
- Ecclesiastical province: Palembang
- Coordinates: 2.9889375°S 104.7471875°E

Statistics
- Area: 157,000 km^{2} (61,000 sq mi)
- Population: Total; Catholics: (as of 2003); 10,828,441; 76,201 (0.7%)

Information
- Rite: Latin Rite
- Cathedral: Cathedral of St Mary in Palembang

Current leadership
- Pope: Leo XIV
- Metropolitan Archbishop: Yohanes Harun Yuwono
- Vicar General: Yohanes Kristianto
- Bishops emeritus: Aloysius Sudarso, S.C.I.

Map

Website
- Website of the Archdiocese

The Roman Catholic Archdiocese of Palembang (Latin: Palembangen(sis)) is an archdiocese located in the city of Palembang in South Sumatra in Indonesia.

== History ==
- December 27, 1923: Established as Apostolic Prefecture of Benkoelen from the Apostolic Prefecture of Sumatra
- June 13, 1939: Promoted as Apostolic Vicariate of Palembang
- January 3, 1961: Promoted as Diocese of Palembang
- July 1, 2003: Promoted as Metropolitan Archdiocese of Palembang

== Leadership ==
- Archbishops of Palembang (Roman rite)
  - Archbishop Yohanes Harun Yuwono (July 3, 2021 – ...)
  - Archbishop Aloysius Sudarso, S.C.I. (July 1, 2003 – July 3, 2021)
- Bishops of Palembang (Roman Rite)
  - Bishop Aloysius Sudarso, S.C.I. (later Archbishop) (May 20, 1997 – July 1, 2003)
  - Bishop Joseph Hubertus Soudant, S.C.I. (April 5, 1963 – May 20, 1997)
  - Bishop Henri Martin Mekkelholt, S.C.I. (April 5, 1963 – December 26, 1969)
- Vicars Apostolic of Palembang (Roman Rite)
  - Bishop Henri Martin Mekkelholt, S.C.I. (June 13, 1939 – January 3, 1961)
- Prefects Apostolic of Benkoelen (Roman Rite)
  - Fr. Henri Martin Mekkelholt, S.C.I. (later Bishop) (January 19, 1934 – June 13, 1939)
  - Fr. Harrie van Oort, S.C.I. (January 19, 1927 – 1934)
  - Fr. Enrico Smeets, S.C.I. (May 28, 1924 – 1926)

== Suffragan dioceses ==
- Pangkal-Pinang
- Tanjungkarang

== Sources ==
- Official website
- GCatholic.org
- Catholic Hierarchy
