= Aloysius Sudarso =

21st-century Indonesian Catholic archbishop

Aloysius Sudarso S.C.J.
- Archbishop of Palembang
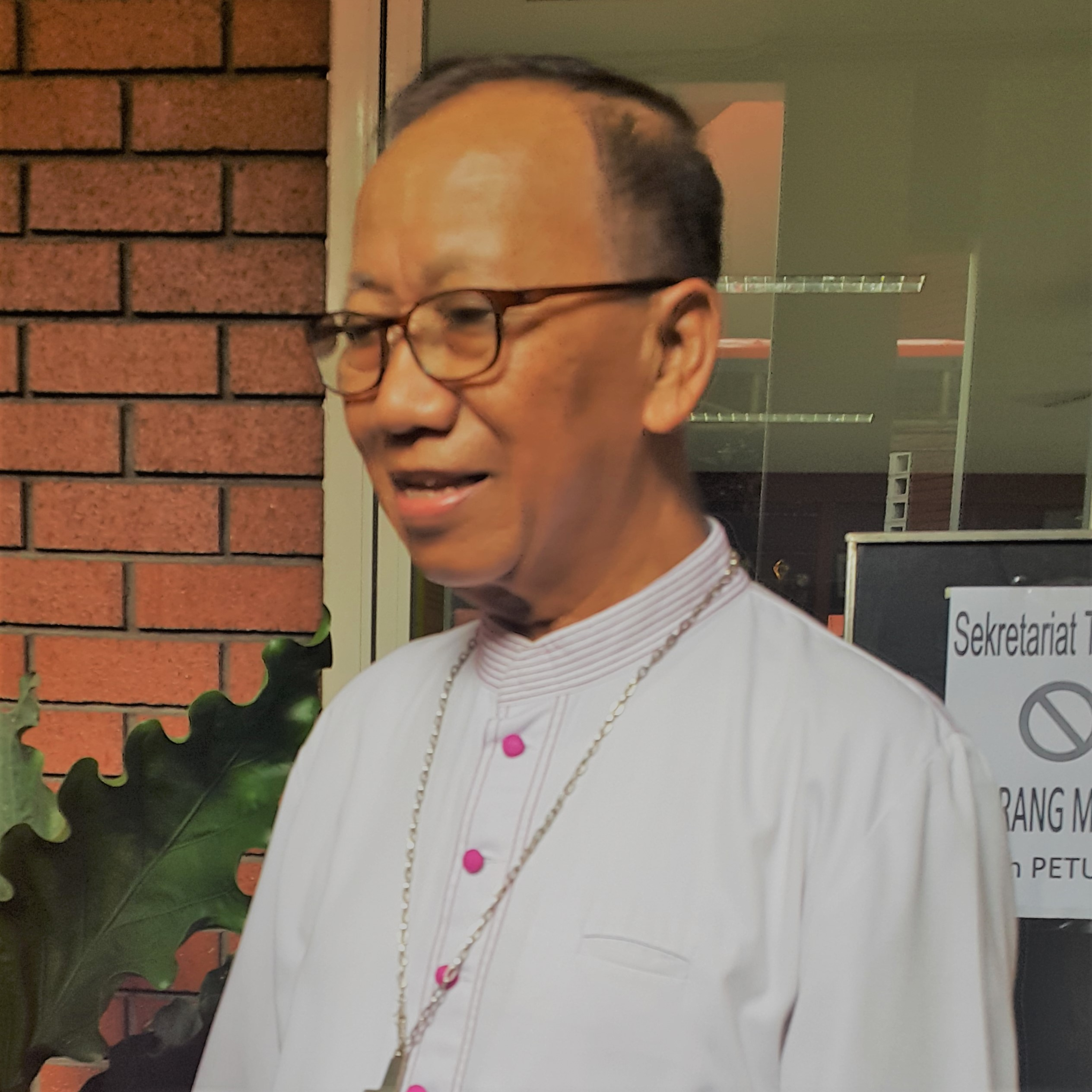
- The archbishop in 2017.
- Church: Roman Catholic Church
- Archdiocese: Palembang
- See: Palembang
- In office: 20 May 1997 – 1 July 2003 (as bishop of Palembang); 1 July 2013 – (as archbishop of Palembang)
- Predecessor: Joseph Hubertus Soudant S.C.J.
- Previous post: Titular Bishop of Bavagaliana

Orders
- Ordination: 14 December 1972
- Consecration: 23 September 2017 by Joseph Hubertus Soudant S.C.J.

Personal details
- Born: 12 December 1945 (age 80) Yogyakarta, Dutch East Indies
- Motto: Tuus servus sum ego (I am your servant)

Aloysius Sudarso S.C.J. (born 12 December 1945) is an Indonesian Roman Catholic bishop.

== Biography ==
Sudarso was ordained a member of the Congregation of the Priests of the Sacred Heart on 14 December 1972. On 17 November 1993, Sudarso was appointed as the Auxiliary Bishop of Palembang with the title of Titular Bavagaliana Bishop. On 25 March 1994, he was ordained bishop by Joseph Hubertus Soudant S.C.J. then the bishop of Palembang. The co-consecrators were Alfred Gonti Pius Datubara O.F.M. Cap., then the Archbishop of Medan, and Andreas Henrisusanta S.C.J., then Bishop of Tanjungkarang. On 20 May 1997, he was appointed Bishop of Palembang to continue the leadership of Soudant, whose resignation was accepted by Pope John Paul II.

On 1 July 2013 the diocese of Palembang was elevated to that of an archdiocese, and as a result Suarso's position was elevated from bishop to archbishop.

In December 2018 an autobiography of Sudarso titled "The Power of Surrender" written by Hendro Setiawan was released. Setiwan, as well as Sudarso and several other personalities were present at the book launch.
