= 2026 Flores earthquake =

Earthquake in Indonesia

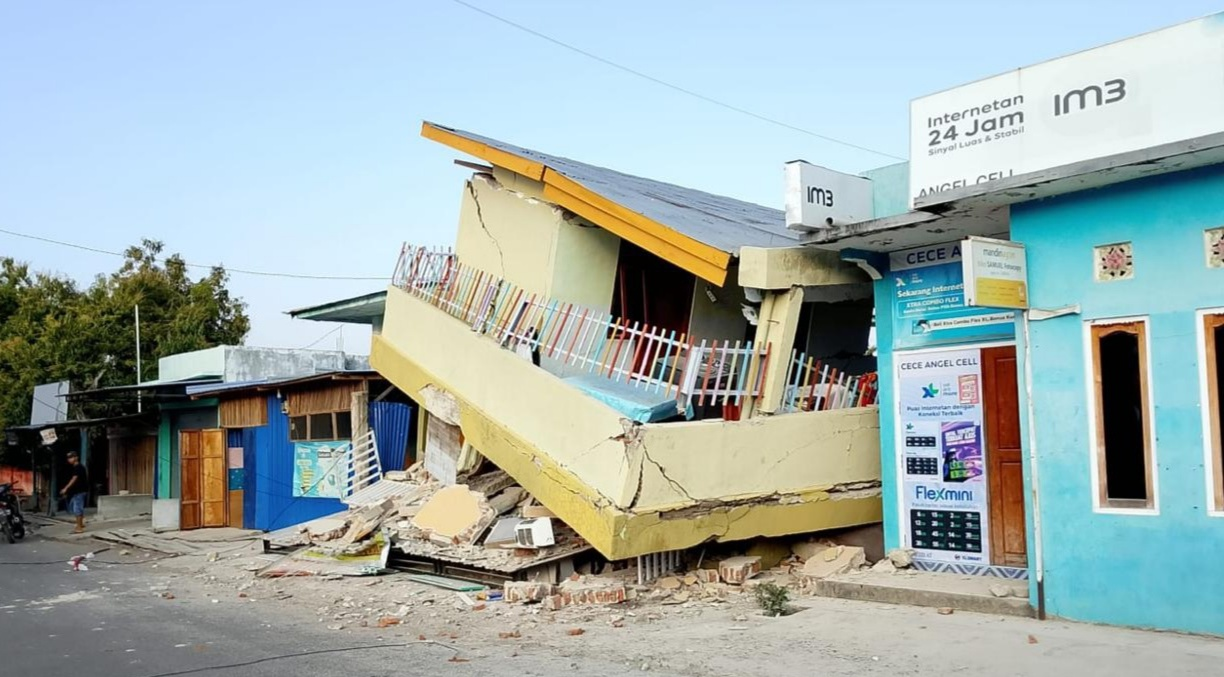
- A collapsed building in East Manggarai Regency

- Location within Indonesia
- UTC time: 2026-08-14 21:58:21
- ISC event: 646150625
- USGS-ANSS: ComCat
- Local date: 15 August 2026
- Local time: 05:58:21 WITA (UTC+8)
- Magnitude: M_{w} 7.8
- Depth: 10 km (6.2 mi)
- Epicenter: 8.310°S 121.352°E
- Fault: Flores back-arc thrust fault
- Type: Thrust
- Areas affected: Flores, Sumbawa, Sumba and South Sulawesi, Indonesia
- Max. intensity: MMI VIII (Severe)
- Peak acceleration: 0.635 g
- Peak velocity: 46.9 cm (18.5 in)/s
- Tsunami: 2.68 m (8.8 ft) run-up
- Aftershocks: 5,688+ (130 felt), largest mb 6.1
- Casualties: 142 dead, 1,776 injured

On 15 August 2026, at 05:58 WITA (UTC+8), a M_{w} 7.8 earthquake struck off the coast of the island of Flores in East Nusa Tenggara, Indonesia. The earthquake was caused by movement on the Flores back-arc thrust fault located north of the island. Seismic observatories recorded a maximum Modified Mercalli intensity of VIII (Severe) on Flores. It triggered a tsunami with a maximum recorded height of 2.68 m (8 ft 10 in). At least 142 people were killed in the earthquake while another 1,776 people were injured. Approximately 98,900 homes were damaged, 27,400 of which collapsed or were badly damaged.

== Tectonic setting ==
A tectonic map of the Java area and areas further east

Indonesia lies on the Pacific Ring of Fire, an area of significant volcanic and tectonic activity. The archipelago is located between the Eurasian, Pacific and Australian tectonic plates. The Flores area in particular contains both strike-slip faults and thrust faults. The Flores backthrust (FBAT), located north of the island arc (Bali, Lombok, Sumbawa, Flores Sumba, Rote and Timor), is entirely within the backarc region. It formed from subduction of the Indo-Australian plate underneath the Eurasian plate while west of Lombok, involves continental collision of the Australian plate and Banda Arc, south of Rote Island. It is characterized by intermediate-depth down-dip subduction. It is a part of the larger backthrust of the back-arc region of Indonesia. Earlier marine geophysical studies have suggested that the back-arc backthrust consists of two regions: the Wetar thrust and the FBAT. However, newer research suggests that the whole thrust is continuous, spanning a distance of about 2,000 km (1,200 mi). The Sunda and Australian plates converge at a rate of 80 mm (3.1 in) per year, in which the Sunda megathrust takes 70 mm (2.8 in) per year of the movement. The remaining 10 mm (0.39 in) per year rate is accommodated by the FBAT. It runs off the north coast of the Lesser Sunda Islands, in the Banda Sea.

The area is seismically active, with 79 earthquakes larger than M_{w} 6.0 recorded in the area between 1900 and 2022. Eleven of those quakes generated tsunamis. In addition, the area has generated at least six tsunamigenic quakes of ≥M_{s} 6.5 since 1800. There exists substantial tsunami risk associated with the back-arc thrust of Indonesia. The lesser-studied eastern part of Indonesia has been hit by more tsunamis than the more-studied western part. Despite back-arc thrust tsunamis not being as common as megathrust tsunamis, they can still inflict severe damage. The eastern segment of the FBAT ruptured in the 1992 Flores earthquake, while the western segment has remained unruptured. Corresponding segments of the FBAT in Bali and Lombok were responsible for very destructive earthquakes in 1815, 1857, 1917, 1979 and 2018. The segment east of Flores was responsible for the 2004 Alor earthquake.

== Earthquake ==
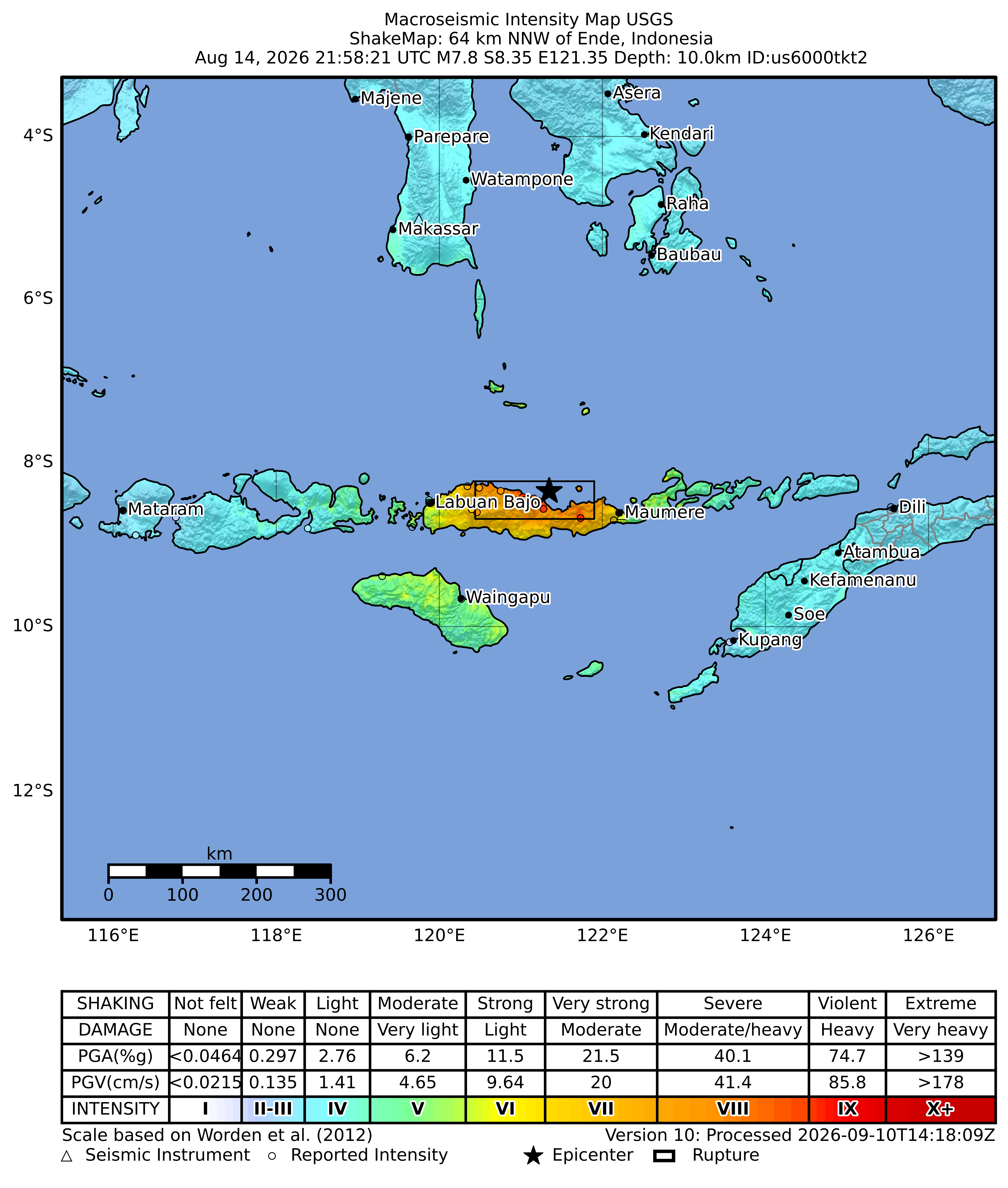
USGS ShakeMap

The earthquake occurred at 05:58 WITA with an epicenter off the northern coast of East Nusa Tenggara, 68 km (42 mi) north-northwest of Ende. It measured 7.8 on the moment magnitude scale and was caused shallow thrust faulting. The earthquake initiated at a depth of 10 km (6.2 mi) and propagated along an east-striking fault dipping at a shallow angle to the south. Germany's GFZ Helmholtz Centre for Geosciences reported the event at M_{w} 7.61 and its depth at 25 km (16 mi). The United States Geological Survey (USGS) estimated that the earthquake had a rupture size of 90 by 45 km (56 by 28 mi). The fault responsible was a section of the FBAT, and geologists had previously suggested that a magnitude 7.8–7.9 event was possible on the corresponding section.

=== Aftershocks ===
As of 5 September, the BMKG recorded 13,000 aftershocks with magnitudes ranging from 1.0 to 6.2 with depths no more than 60 km (37 mi), of which 177 were felt. At least 134 aftershocks exceeding M_{w} 4.0 were recorded by the USGS, the largest measuring mb 6.1. The BMKG said a high rate of aftershocks is expected to continue for the next two or three weeks after the mainshock before it gradually decays. Faisal Fathani, the head of the BMKG, said it is typical for damaging earthquakes around the North Maluku region to be followed by many aftershocks.

The BMKG inferred four clusters of concentrated activity. Cluster 1 is located off the north coast of Nagekeo. Because the focal mechanisms of the mainshock and 17 August M_{w} 5.8 aftershock featured thrust faulting on an east–west trending fault, this cluster is likely on the FBAT. The other clusters are located west and north of Manggarai. Cluster 2 lies further offshore, north of the surface expression of the FBAT. One of the larger aftershocks in this cluster, measuring M_{w} 5.6, was caused by normal faulting on a northwest–southeast trending fault. Cluster 3 is near Reo and displayed high seismicity from 19 to 21 August. These aftershocks are associated with north–south trending normal faults. Cluster 4 is located at the western edge of the rupture.

=== Fault model ===
M_{ww}7.8 finite fault by USGS

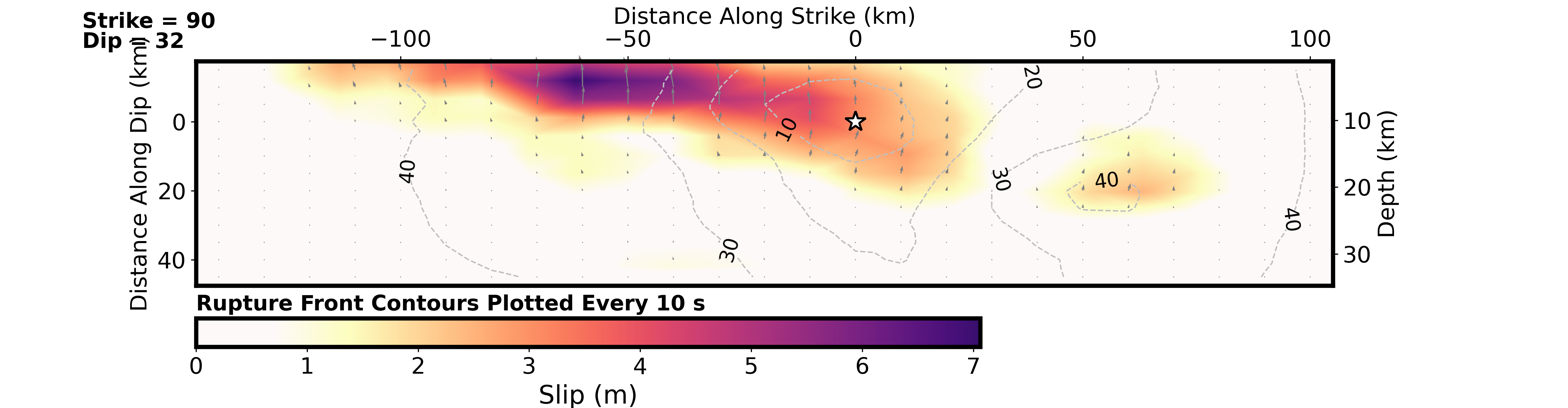
Distribution of slip across the rupture

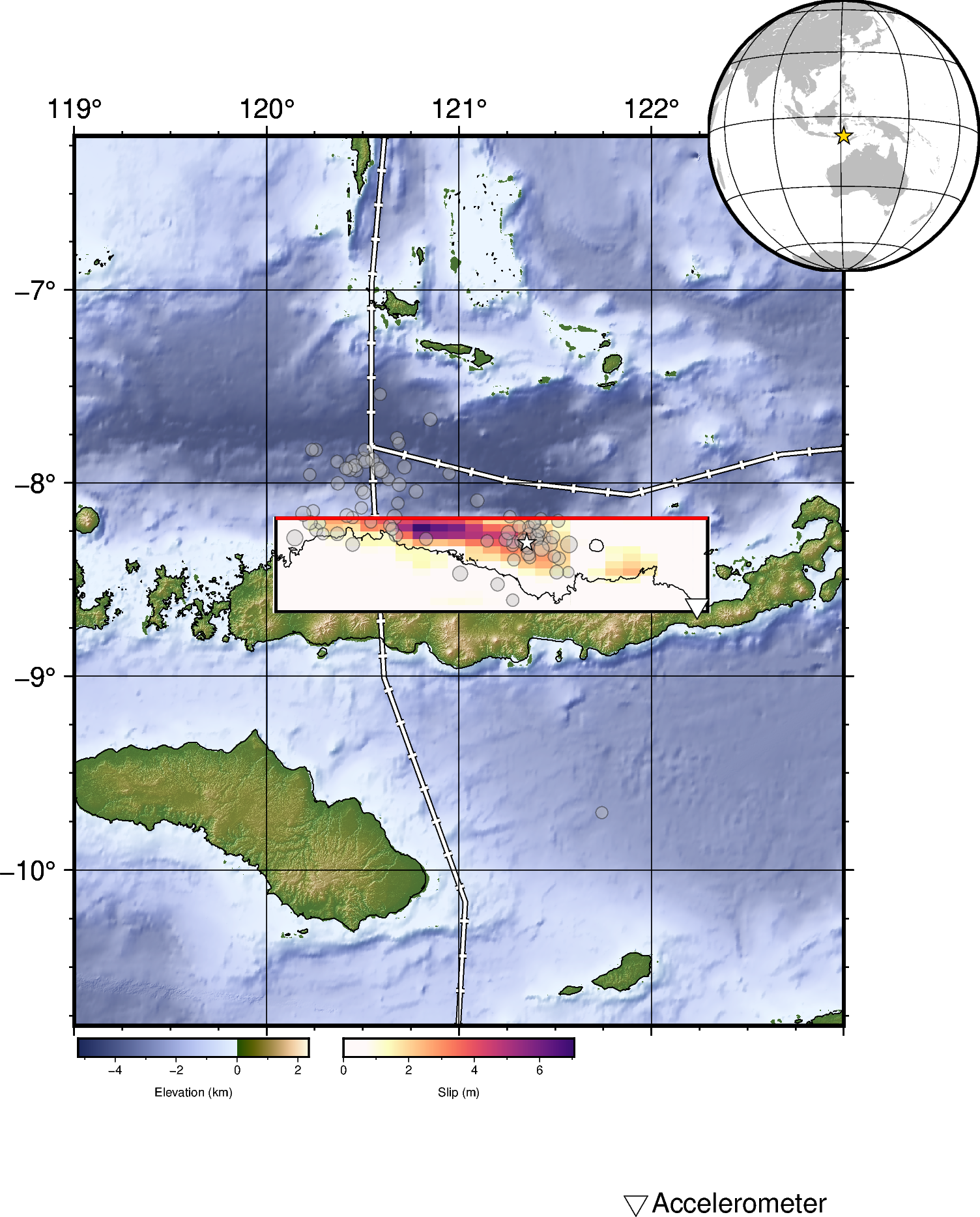
Surface projection of finite fault model

The USGS published a preliminary finite-fault rupture model indicating that the primary slip patch measured approximately 150 by 40 km (93 by 25 mi), with the total rupture lasting about 51 seconds. The fault was oriented east-northeast and dipped southward at an angle of 32°. Although the rupture propagated bilaterally, most of the displacement occurred near the hypocenter, particularly down-dip and to its west. The shallower (>10 km (6.2 mi)) parts of the fault up-dip and northwest of the hypocenter experienced the greatest slip of 3.8653 m (12.681 ft). The primary slip zone propagated to the seafloor while extending to depths of 30 km (19 mi) within the crust. There is also an isolated slip patch at 20 km (12 mi) depth east-southeast of the hypocenter where the slip peaked at 1.0318 m (3 ft 4.62 in).

The BMKG also published a finite fault model featuring an east–west oriented plane dipping to the south at 30°. In this model, the hypocenter depth was placed at 18 km (11 mi) and the rupture propagated over 100 km (62 mi) westward. The earthquake ruptured three asperities; the first was in the hypocenter area while the two adjacent ones were located up-dip and to the west. The deeper portions of the fault to the south did not exhibit significant slip. A maximum slip of 3.8 m (12 ft) was projected at shallow depths of the fault. The rupture sequence took place with a velocity of 2 km (1.2 mi) per second and was complete in about 75 seconds with three or four episodes of large energy release.

The 1992 and 2026 earthquakes although occurring on adjacent segments, initiated from a central location before propagating east or west. BMKG also made similar observations during their analysis of the 2018 Lombok earthquake sequence where all these events initiated from a common rupture point before propagating away. They inferred that major earthquakes can first rupture a common highly-stressed region.

=== Ground motion ===
Seismic observations at BMKG reported a maximum Modified Mercalli intensity of VIII (Severe) in Manggarai Regency and VII (Very strong) in West Manggarai Regency and Bima Regency. In the epicenter areas of Ngada, Nagekeo and Sikka, and further west in Sumbawa, the intensity was VI (Strong). Intensity V (Moderate) was recorded in East Sumba, East Flores and III–IV (Weak–Light) in some regencies of southern Sulawesi. A maximum peak ground acceleration of 0.635 g was recorded at Kuwus district in West Manggarai, while a peak ground velocity of 46.9 cm (18.5 in) per second was recorded by a seismic station at Ruteng.

=== Tsunami ===
The BMKG issued a tsunami warning for South Sulawesi, Southeast Sulawesi, East Nusa Tenggara, and West Nusa Tenggara two minutes and sixteen seconds after the earthquake. Evacuation orders were issued because of the warning. The BMKG later declared these warnings over at 07:30 WIB.

At least 23 homes were damaged by the tsunami although no one was killed. A tsunami with a maximum run-up of 2.68 m (8 ft 10 in) was reported in the village of Selama. Comparable run-ups were reported in Tadho Tengah (2.42 m (7 ft 11 in)), Dusun Tompong (2.39 m (7 ft 10 in)), and Nangadero (2.24 m (7 ft 4 in)). The tsunami flooded as far as 145 m (476 ft) inland in Nampar Sepang. In Selama, the tsunami had an inundation distance of 136 m (446 ft) and swept away two homes. A 1.61 m (5 ft 3 in) tsunami was reported in Reok, Manggarai Regency. Waves of under 1 m (3 ft 3 in) were reported at Maurole District, Labuan Bajo, and Dompu.

Authorities said the tsunami struck ten locations across East Nusa Tenggara and South Sulawesi provinces. On Buton, South Sulawesi, the tsunami flooded a beach and village in Siontapina Sub-District. In the Selayar Islands, some coastal villages were flooded by the tsunami. At Anakoli village in Nagekeo, the earthquake and tsunami struck during a school scouting activity at a beach attended by more than 350 people. Fears of a tsunami caused a stampede as attendants rushed for higher ground and several were trampled or injured. The tsunami also swept several people away but there were no deaths.

In explaining the different tsunami impact between the 2026 and nearby 1992 earthquakes, New Zealand-based Indonesian geophysics Aditya Gusman said standard tsunami modelling could not replicate the unusually large tsunami run-up during the earlier event. In an earlier research by Pranantyo and Cummins, the 1992 tsunami which reached up to 26 m (85 ft) run-up was caused by concentrated slip in a small area of the fault, the wrap-around effect on Babi Island, and a submarine landslide at Hading Bay. Gusman said because most of the 2026 rupture occurred beneath Flores rather than at sea, the tsunami was smaller. Gusman further emphasized the need for tsunami preparedness because Flores and the surrounding region have experienced historic tsunamis before. In 1928, an eruption on Paluweh triggered a tsunami that killed about 260 people. Another earthquake between Flores and Sumbawa in 1820 also triggered a tsunami reaching 25 m (82 ft) high at South Sulawesi.

== Impact ==
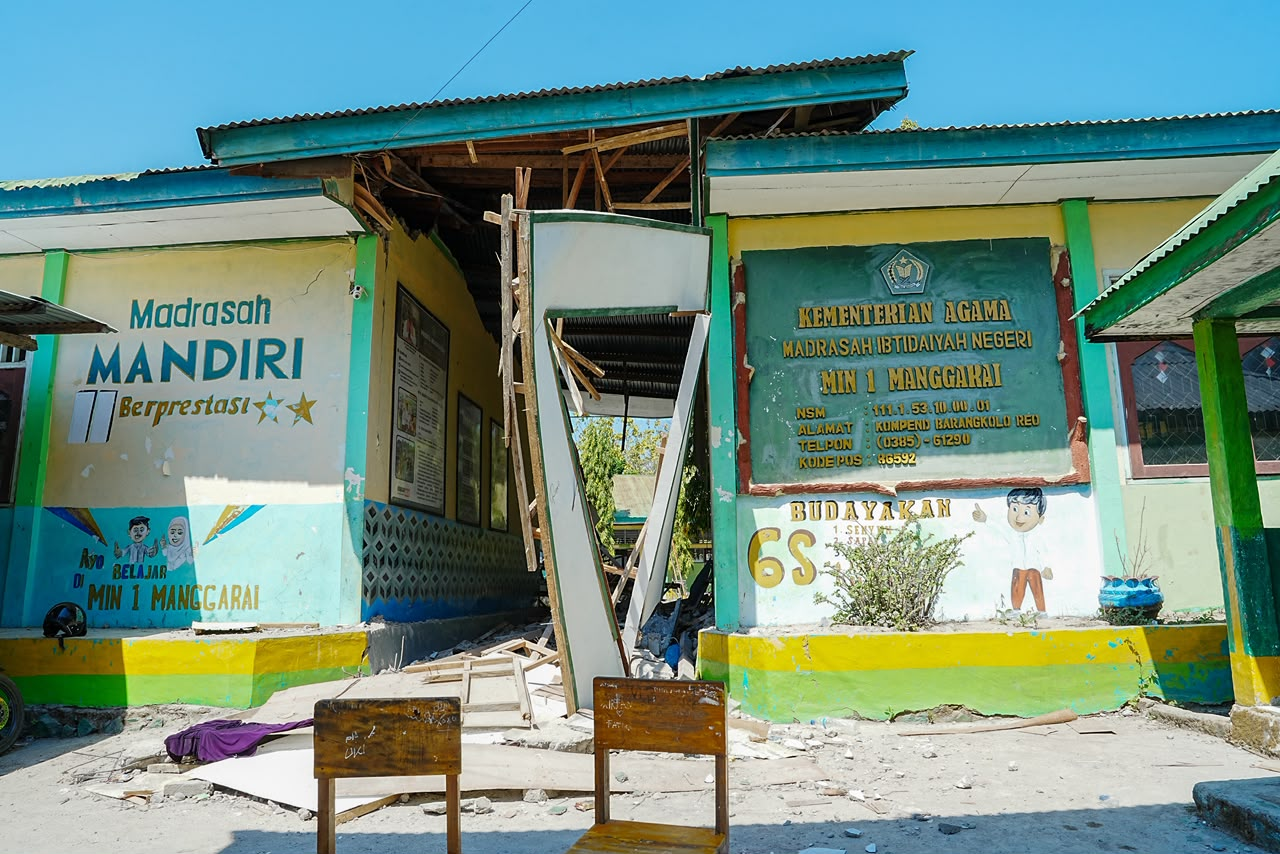
A damaged madrasa in Reok, Manggarai Regency

According to the National Agency for Disaster Countermeasure (BNPB), at least 142 people were killed and 1,776 others were injured, 336 of them seriously. It is the deadliest earthquake in Indonesia since the 2022 West Java earthquake. East Nusa Tenggara governor Emanuel Melkiades Laka Lena said most of the victims died while they were asleep as rubble fell onto them. Manggarai and East Manggarai regencies recorded 41 and 36 deaths, respectively; 13 deaths were reported in Nagekeo, and the remaining 15 deaths were from Sikka, Ende, Ngada and West Manggarai.

A total of 95,567 homes were damaged, of which 27,414 were heavily damaged while the remaining had moderate or light damage. At least 1,918 educational facilities, 495 water infrastructure units, 371 sanitation facilities, and 257 offices were also affected. Twenty of 52 petrol stations in Flores were closed due to earthquake damage. Seventeen road sections and 14 bridges were affected. Around 566,797 people lost electricity. Around 812 cellular sites were also disabled. One death was that of a drowned fisherman whose body was found in the sea off Lamba Leda in East Manggarai. On 21 August, during relief work, a volunteer from Jakarta died from suspected exhaustion. Two children also died while at an evacuation center, which an Indonesian Child Protection Commission official attributed to an illness which worsened due to the conditions at the camp.

Initial power outages made sharing information about the earthquake damage difficult. At least eight people died in Reok District of Manggarai. Two people were killed and five others were injured in Maumere. A maritime passenger terminal in the city collapsed, causing hundreds of passengers inside to be struck by falling debris. Also at the terminal, some people fell into the sea after a gangway to an inter-island ferry collapsed as they were boarding. Among the injured were two Chinese tourists at a hotel in Labuan Bajo who were fleeing in panic. On Padar Island, 986 tourists were stranded after maritime port services were suspended. A landslide occurred at the crater wall of Kelimutu National Park.

Authorities said 651 public buildings including 112 religious education facilities, 300 places of worship, and 238 health facilities were affected. Many buildings were damaged in Ruteng while at Frans Sales Lega Airport, the ceiling partially collapsed. Damage also occurred in a campus building of a university in Ruteng. At the district's hospital, its operating theatre and clinic ceilings collapsed. Buildings were also damaged in Borong. In the remote areas of the regency, many homes collapsed and several bridges were damaged. Many residents fled to hilly areas due to fears of a tsunami. Multiple roads were impassable, such as between Ende and Nagekeo, and Ende and Maumere. In Mbay, Nagekeo Regency, at least five or six homes were reportedly damaged. In Labuan Bajo, buildings were damaged in several locations, including a hotel and Komodo International Airport. Many homes and buildings were damaged or destroyed in West Manggarai Regency. The Umbu Mehang Kunda Airport in East Sumba Regency and Soa Airport in Bajawa were also affected.

In Bima, West Nusa Tenggara, several homes and buildings were damaged, including a mosque and a warehouse. In East Sumba Regency, several buildings were damaged including two churches of which walls and ceilings collapsed. Strong shaking was felt in Makassar, where it lasted two minutes. In Selayar Islands Regency, South Sulawesi, nine homes were slightly damaged, four others were moderately damaged, and several others were affected by sea waves that entered houses in Pasilambena District. More than 50 families evacuated in hilly areas, primarily due to the trauma caused by previous incidents especially the 2021 Flores earthquake. The earthquake was also felt as far as Lombok.

In August 17, at 08:46 WITA, a magnitude 5.7–5.8 aftershock killed two people in Ngada Regency, including one as a result of rockfalls. Another person died of a heart attack due to an aftershock measuring 5.8 on August 20 at 06:45 WITA. Two residents were injured in Palue Island by a magnitude 5.0 aftershock at 22:15 WITA. A magnitude 4.3 aftershock in September 4 caused a landslide that blocked an access road in Palue Island, disrupting relief efforts.

== Response ==
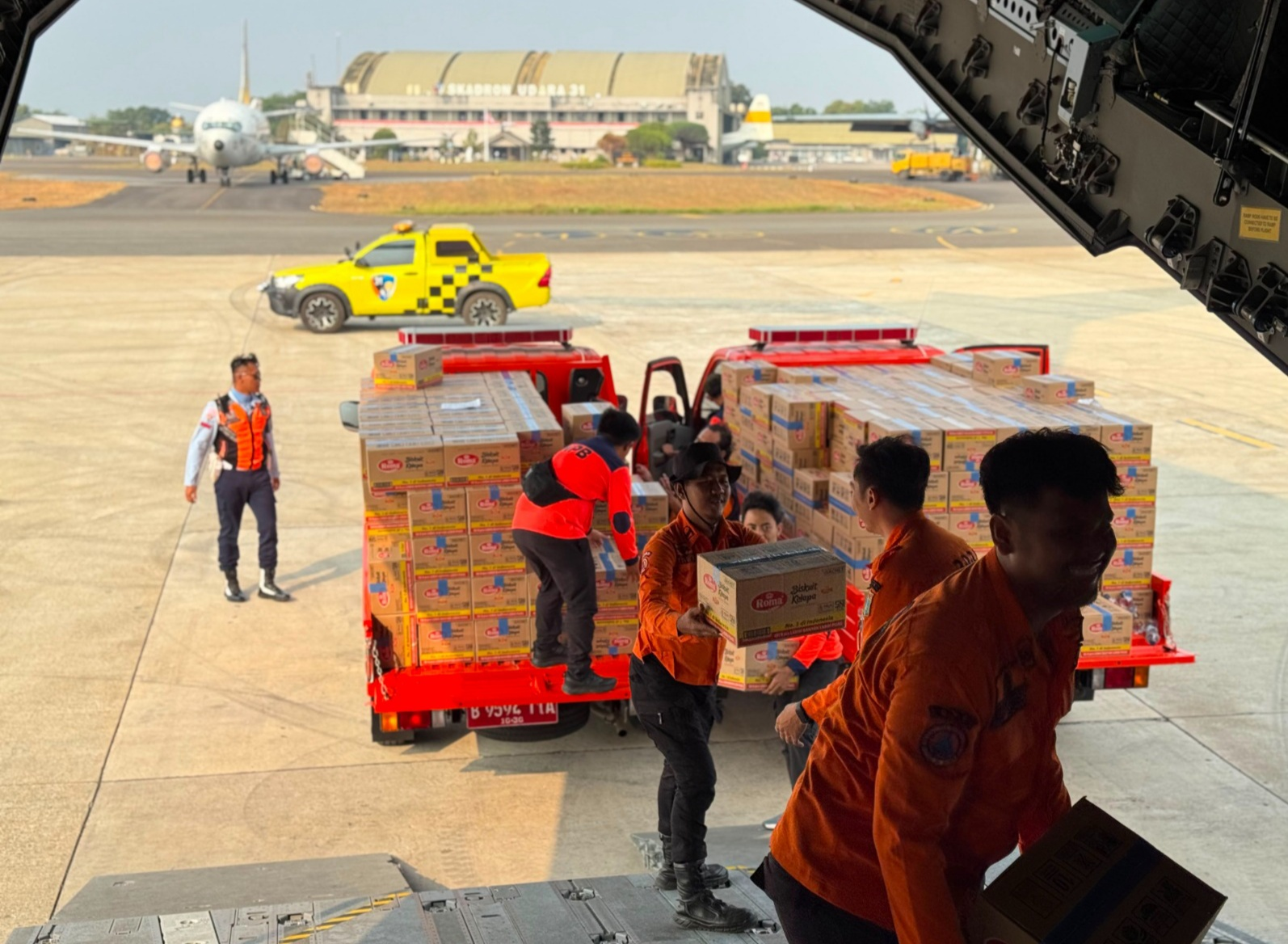
Loading aid at Halim Perdanakusuma International Airport

More than 2,000 people fled to higher ground after the earthquake when a tsunami warning was issued. The warning was later rescinded, but local authorities advised residents not to enter damaged buildings or infrastructure because they could collapse during aftershocks. A search-and-rescue spokesperson said on 15 August that their main priority was to search for people who may be trapped beneath the rubble. Other officials were also on Flores to assess the extent of the damage. Damaged homes and fear among residents forced thousands to live in shelters. More than 188,161 people were displaced, with more than 100,000 of them in Manggarai and Nagekeo. A field outside the Ende police station became a makeshift shelter for residents worried about returning to their homes. The Diocese of Labuan Bajo canceled the closing celebrations of the Golo Koe Maria Assumpta Nusantara Festival.

A 14-day state of emergency was declared in East Nusa Tenggara by governor Emanuel Melkiades Laka Lena beginning 15 August. The Presidential Assistance program assisted in providing 50,000 food packages measuring 275 tonnes for affected residents. Several other agencies including the BNPB also aided them with supplies. Bulog sent 1,321.55 tons of rice and 7,000 liters of cooking oil. The National Search and Rescue Agency (Basarnas) dispatched specialized teams from areas including Bali and West Nusa Tenggara to assist in rescue efforts in East Nusa Tenggara. About 100 Mobile Brigade Corps personnel of the Indonesian National Police (Polri) and additional members from other specialized response divisions were sent to Flores. Polri said 137 members from Java were dispatched on 15 August, and they would also send a team of police dogs to support in looking for people trapped under the rubble the following day totaling 260 personnel. The Indonesian National Armed Forces (TNI) also deployed 1,267 personnel to assist in emergency operations. The Indonesian Air Force mobilized six aircraft to deliver aid to Flores. Defence minister Sjafrie Sjamsoeddin visited Komodo Airport on 18 August to oversee the TNI's operations. The Ministry of Marine Affairs and Fisheries sent 50 metric tons of relief supplies from Kendari to Labuan Bajo aboard the surveillance vessel Orca 06.

President Prabowo Subianto ordered Coordinating Minister for Human Development and Culture Pratikno, Minister of Home Affairs Tito Karnavian, Minister of Public Works Dody Hanggodo, Basarnas head Mohammad Syafii, BNPB chief Suharyanto and two deputy ministers to go to East Nusa Tenggara to assess the situation. Vice president Gibran Rakabuming Raka also went to East Nusa Tenggara on 20 August, followed by President Prabowo on 26 August. By 17 August, some 3,500 members of TNI and Polri had been dispatched in Manggarai, Maumere, and other affected regions. The BNPB airlifted at least 1,954 tons of aid supplies. The Ministry of Public Works was tasked with clearing roads blocked by landslides. They were able to clear major routes like the Trans-Flores road and another road near the 49KM marker in Reo District. The Perusahaan Listrik Negara (PLN) also said power was beginning to be restored in several areas. To support relief efforts, the provincial disaster management office of East Java also flew in their logistics personnel and healthcare workers on 17 August. The Higher Education, Science, and Technology Ministry pledged to shoulder the tuition fees of 5,000 affected university students for one semester.

Across the island, hospitals and clinics operated outdoors because their buildings and equipment were damaged. Medical supplies were also rapidly diminishing for those injured. Patients at two hospitals in Sikka and Ende regencies were evacuated. Fifteen patients and five infants received care in a tent installed outside the Ende Regional General Hospital grounds. The hospital was evacuated as a precautionary measure in the event an aftershock causes it to collapse. Many displaced residents of Sikka Regency also spent the night of 15 August at the Gelora Samador Stadium. Some hospitals like the Dampek Health Centre continued to treat patients despite bring destroyed although there was only one doctor treating several hundred patients. At Lalang Health Centre, essential medical supplies from other regions only arrived on 17 August, and a doctor said that those in serious conditions were referred to the Ruteng Regional General Hospital four hours away. At the Ruteng hospital, a communications personnel said that despite news of additional assistance arriving, they have yet to receive any. For some remote communities such as Nitung Village and on Palue Island north of Flores, relief only arrived several days later. One resident of Palue was airlifted by the BNPB to Maumere on 24 August to treat injuries caused by falling debris.

Specialists were brought in from Surabaya to provide additional medical care in Ruteng. The Indonesian Navy deployed 217 Marine Corps personnel and the hospital ship KRI Dr. Soeharso-990, which has two treatment rooms and 40 beds, to Manggarai. The Indonesian Army also deployed its hospital ship ADRI-XCII BM. The Indonesian Red Cross also sent 33,947 relief items to Labuan Bajo for redistribution across affected areas. Pertamina also opened a clinic in Manggarai. The Health Ministry also set up two field hospitals in Aeramo and Ruteng. It also deployed 206 health workers specializing in primary care and 160 personnel specializing in psychosocial and mental health services.

== See also ==
- 1674 Ambon earthquake and megatsunami – Earthquake and tsunami in Indonesia
- 1979 Lembata tsunami – Tsunami affecting Indonesia
- List of earthquakes in 2026
- List of earthquakes in Indonesia
