= 2021 Flores earthquake =

Earthquake in Indonesia

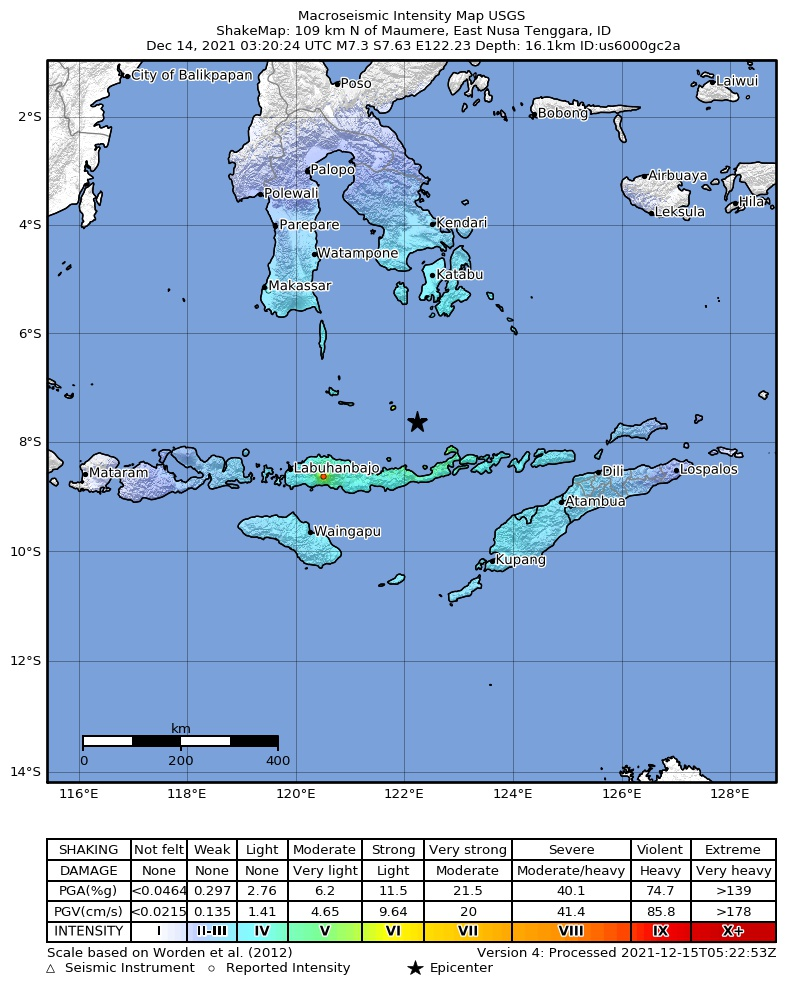

- Location within Indonesia
- UTC time: 2021-12-14 03:20:24
- ISC event: 621629136
- USGS-ANSS: ComCat
- Local date: 14 December 2021
- Local time: 11:20:24 WITA
- Magnitude: 7.3–7.4 M_{w}
- Depth: 16.1 km (10.0 mi)
- Epicenter: 7.603°S 122.200°E
- Type: Strike-slip
- Areas affected: NTT, South Sulawesi, Indonesia
- Total damage: Moderate
- Max. intensity: MMI VI (Strong)
- Tsunami: 7 cm (2.8 in)
- Aftershocks: 896 (as of 20 December 2021)
- Casualties: 1 dead, 173 injured

An earthquake occurred 112 km, offshore, north of Maumere in the Flores Sea on 14 December. The quake had a moment magnitude (M_{w}) of 7.3 according to the United States Geological Survey (USGS). One person was killed and 173 others suffered injuries.

== Earthquake ==
Initially a magnitude 7.7, it was downgraded to 7.3. The quake was the result of shallow strike-slip faulting within the shallow crust beneath the Flores Sea. According to the USGS, the earthquake rupture was on an east northeast-west southwest fault with a right-lateral strike-slip motion.

A finite fault model by the ANSS indicate rupture along a fault measuring 90 km by 15 km with a maximum coseismic slip of 4.0 meters. A professor at the Bandung Institute of Technology said the seismogenic fault may have been 80 km to 110 km long, and up to 30 km deep. Coseismic slip might have been 2.3 meters across the rupture area.

Within the epicenter region of the quake are eight known faults—the 2021 event did not occur on any of those. This region of Indonesia is also not as seismically active, hence many expert seismologists did not expect a large earthquake to occur. The strike-slip mechanism was also unusual as thrust faulting is the dominant mechanism for earthquakes in the area. Scientists at the Earth Observatory of Singapore said the fault marked the boundary between two blocks of crust; the north block moving right, relative to the block south of the fault. In 2007, the fault generated a magnitude 5.1 quake.

An academic research paper in 2022 identified it as the "Kalaotoa Fault", a previously unknown structure. This strike-slip dextral fault system consists of three segments with lengths of ~100 km, ~50 km, and ~40 km, respectively. Earthquakes were also triggered on the Selayar Fault, a prominent normal fault located west of the Kalaotoa Fault, believed to be the result of stress transfer. The earthquake was the largest in the region since a deep-focus M_{w} 7.9 struck in 1996.

The shaking was reportedly most intense on the Selayar Islands, reaching a maximum Modified Mercalli intensity of VI (Strong) according to the Meteorology, Climatology, and Geophysical Agency (BMKG). The earthquake was also felt V in Ranakah. In Lembata, Labuan Bajo, Larantuka and Ruteng, weak shaking (III–IV) was felt.

It occurred just a few days after the anniversary of a 1992 earthquake and tsunami in the same region.

=== Tsunami ===
Tsunami warnings were issued to coastal communities of the Flores region, causing panic among residents. Videos posted on social media showed panicked residents running to higher ground to avoid the anticipated waves. The tsunami however, was minor, measuring only 7 centimeters (2.8 inches). Warnings were cancelled two hours later at 13:20 local time.

== Tectonic setting ==
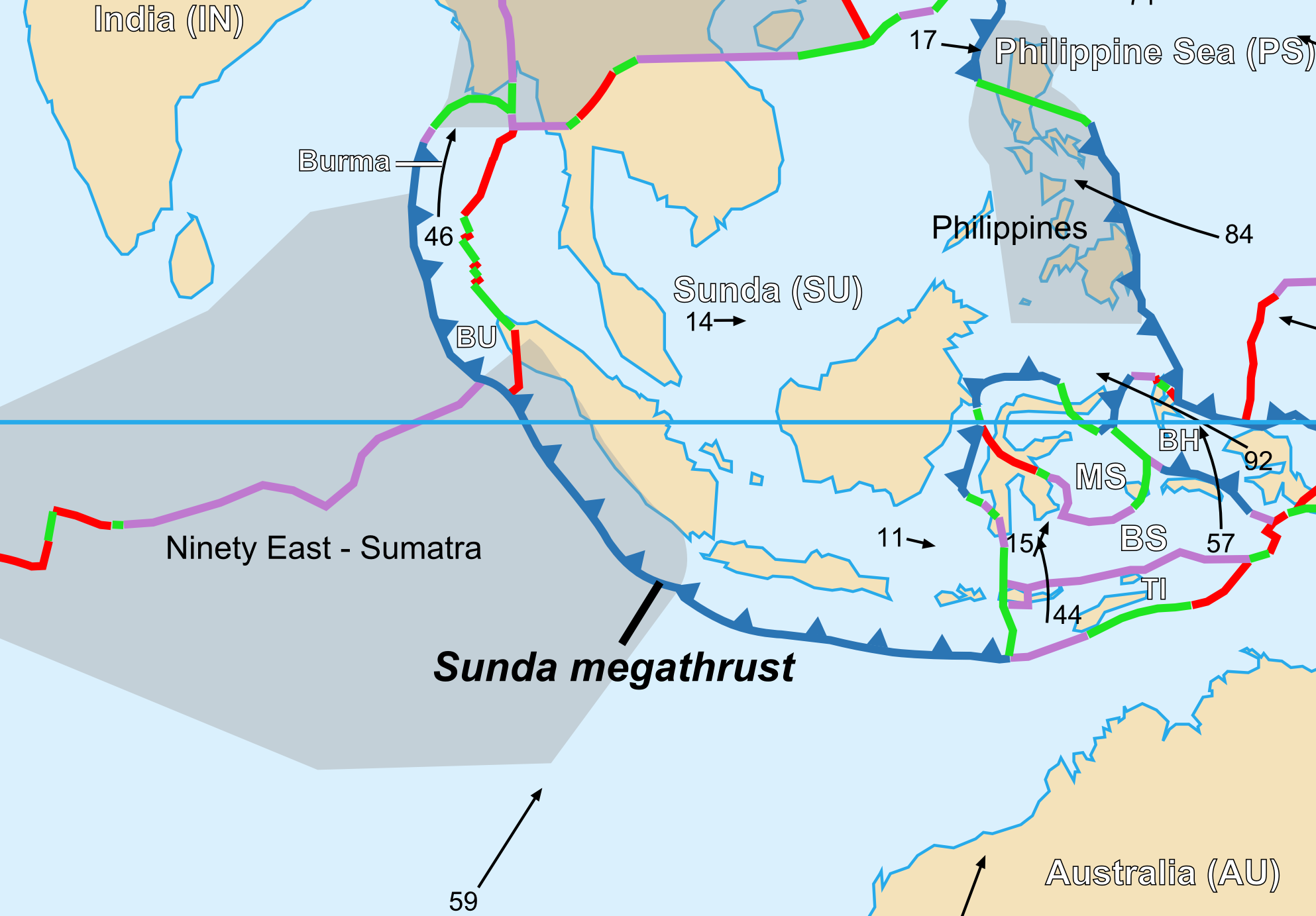
A map showing major plate boundaries of Indonesia.

The Flores region lie at the complex tectonic boundary between the Australian and Sunda plates, as well as several microplates. Among the major active faults are the Flores back-arc thrust fault and Sunda megathrust to accommodate the complex convergence between the tectonic plates. The Flores Back Arc Thrust formed due to the convergence between the Sunda and Australian plates, accommodating compression. The two plates converge at a rate of 80 mm/yr, in which the Sunda megathrust takes 70 mm/yr of the movement. The remaining 10 mm/yr rate is accommodated by the Flores Back Arc Thrust Fault. It runs off the north coast of the Lesser Sunda Islands, in the Banda Sea.

The event itself did not occur on the Sunda megathrust subduction boundary, nor did it occur on the Flores back-arc thrust fault, based on inferring the focal mechanism. In the early 19th-century, the Flores Back Arc Thrust Fault also produced the large earthquakes and tsunamis in 1820 and 1815. More recently, it was responsible for the magnitude 7.8 earthquake in 1992 that triggered a devastating tsunami, as well as the 2018 Lombok earthquakes.

== Impact ==
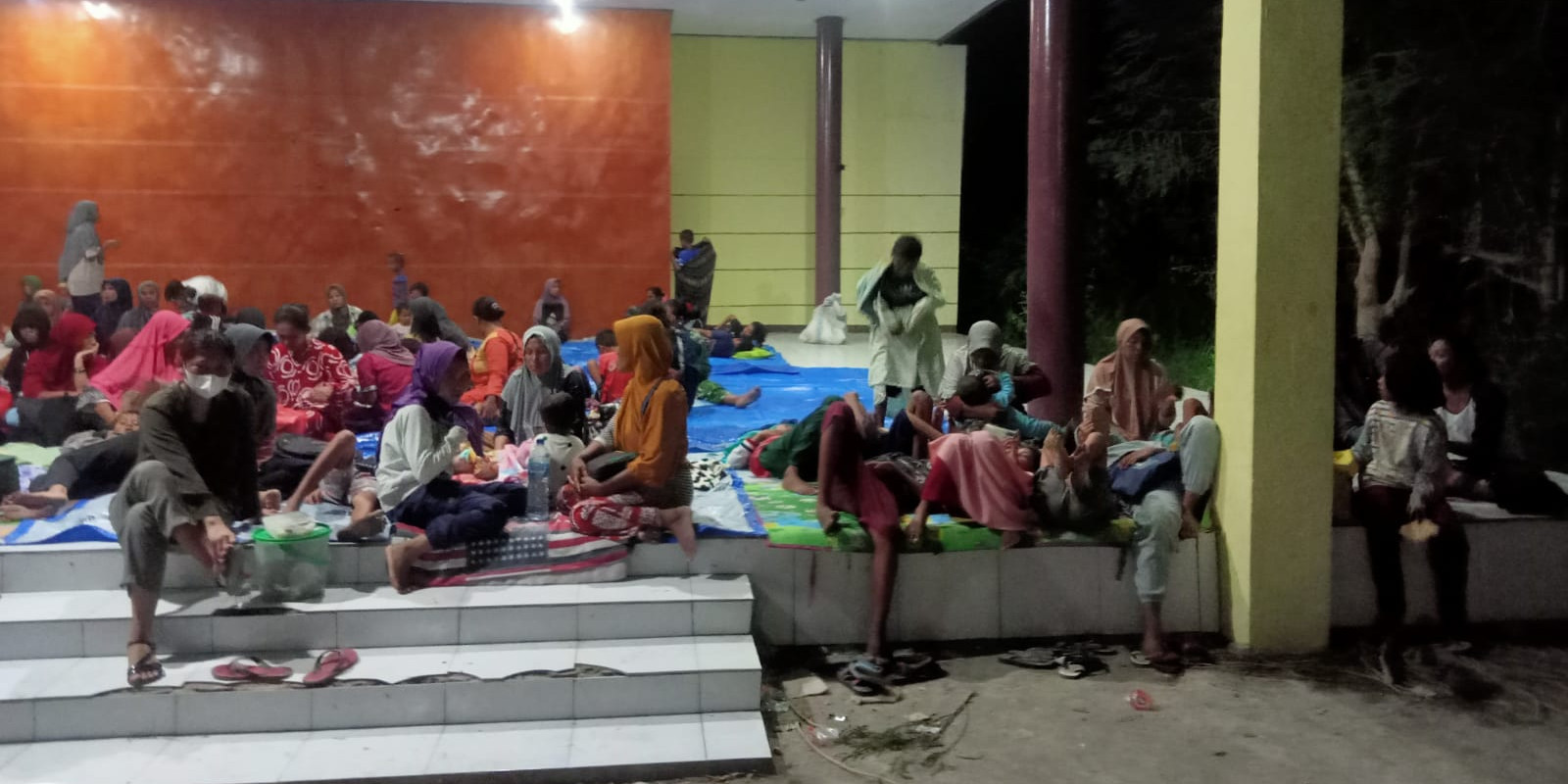
Hundreds of residents were displaced in Selayar Islands due to the quake

The Selayar and Flores islands were worst affected by the earthquake; 5,064 people were displaced, according to the Indonesian National Board for Disaster Management (BNPB). An estimated 266 of the total displaced were from the Sikka Regency of East Nusa Tenggara. Three school buildings, two mosques, two places of worship and a village office were also damaged. Damage to buildings included roof collapse, toppled concrete walls of fence and homes and collapse of entire homes.

A total of 357 houses were severely damaged, while 800 others and 24 government buildings were damaged. At least 173 people were injured, 119 of them seriously. Some were injured when falling in a panic caused by the tsunami warning system. On 23 December, an elderly man with severe head injuries after being hit by falling debris died at the hospital while receiving treatment. At least one of the injured was from East Nusa Tenggara while the rest were in South Sulawesi.

== Aftermath ==
Residents in South Sulawesi and the Flores region were told not to immediately enter their homes, but to inspect for damages first. While the tsunami warnings were rescinded, the BMKG warned of potentially damaging aftershocks that could collapse already weakened homes. An official from the BMKG advised people in the affected areas to avoid approaching cliffsides or the mountains due to potential rockfall and landslide risks.

By 20 December, at least 16,593 villagers in the Selayar Islands were evacuated from their homes either due to damaged homes or the fear of aftershocks. The BNPB supported the supply of aid to residents including meals and refugee tents. Tranined individuals were also sent to the affected regions to attend to traumatized residents. The BNPB said a team would be flown-in to assess the damage on the islands. Given to the local government were 250 million rupiahs in relief fund from the BNPB as well.

== See also ==
- List of earthquakes in 2021
- List of earthquakes in Indonesia
- 2026 Flores earthquake
