= 2021 Bali earthquake =

Earthquake in Bali

- Location within Bali Location within Indonesia
- UTC time: 2021-10-15 20:18:20
- ISC event: 621204453
- USGS-ANSS: ComCat
- Local date: 16 October 2021
- Local time: 04:18 WITA
- Magnitude: 4.7 M_{w}
- Depth: 10.0 km (6.2 mi)
- Epicentre: 8.348°S 115.461°E
- Type: Strike-slip
- Areas affected: Indonesia
- Max. intensity: MMI IV (Light) (BMKG)
- Landslides: Yes
- Casualties: 4 dead, 73 injured

The 2021 Bali earthquake struck at 04:18 local time (UTC+08:00) when people were still sleeping on 15 October 2021. It resulted in 4 deaths and 73 more injured, despite having a moment magnitude of 4.7.

== Tectonic setting ==
The island of Bali forms part of the Sunda Arc, which formed above the convergent boundary where the Australian plate is subducting beneath the Sunda plate. The rate of convergence across the line of the Sunda–Java Trench is 7.5 cm per year. Eastwards from Bali, the Sunda Arc is also being thrust over the Bali and Flores back-arc basins on a series of south-dipping thrusts. Focal mechanisms of earthquakes near Bali are dominantly thrust sense on both the subduction interface and the system of thrust faults to the north. In July and August 2018, a series of earthquakes, the strongest reaching 6.9 on the moment magnitude scale, killed nearly 600 people in the neighbouring island of Lombok. In January 1917, an earthquake measuring 6.6 killed more than 1,500 people, 80% of which from landslides.

== Earthquake ==
According to officials at the Meteorology, Climatology, and Geophysical Agency (BMKG), the earthquake, which was centred at the slopes of the volcanoes Mount Agung and Mount Batur, occurred on a shallow local fault. Rupture along the fault was caused by the migration of magma in the crust, triggering fault activity. The BMKG has ruled out the Flores back-arc thrust fault as the source of the quake due to the strike-slip focal mechanism indicated by the seismological data.

Instrumental seismic intensities measured by the BMKG suggest the quake only caused light shaking in Bali, but was felt as far as Lombok. At Denpasar, Karangasem, and northern Lombok the earthquake was felt lightly by residents at IV on the Mercalli intensity scale.

== Impact ==
Most of the damage was observed in the Ban Village, Kubu District, Ppatan Village, Rendang District and Karangasem Regency. Many religious and historical structures were mildly to severely damaged. Four people were confirmed dead, one of them being a three-year-old girl who was hit by falling debris. The other three deaths were from a landslide. Seventy-three people were injured, suffering head injuries or broken bones. Most of the injured were treated at the Kubu Pratama and Karangasem hospitals where they were discharged. Three remained hospitalized for their serious injuries. At least 762 buildings were damaged, 101 of which were religious.

== See also ==
- List of earthquakes in 2021
- List of earthquakes in Indonesia
- 1976 Bali earthquake
- 1815 Bali earthquake
