= 1992 Flores earthquake and tsunami =

Destructive tectonic event in Indonesia

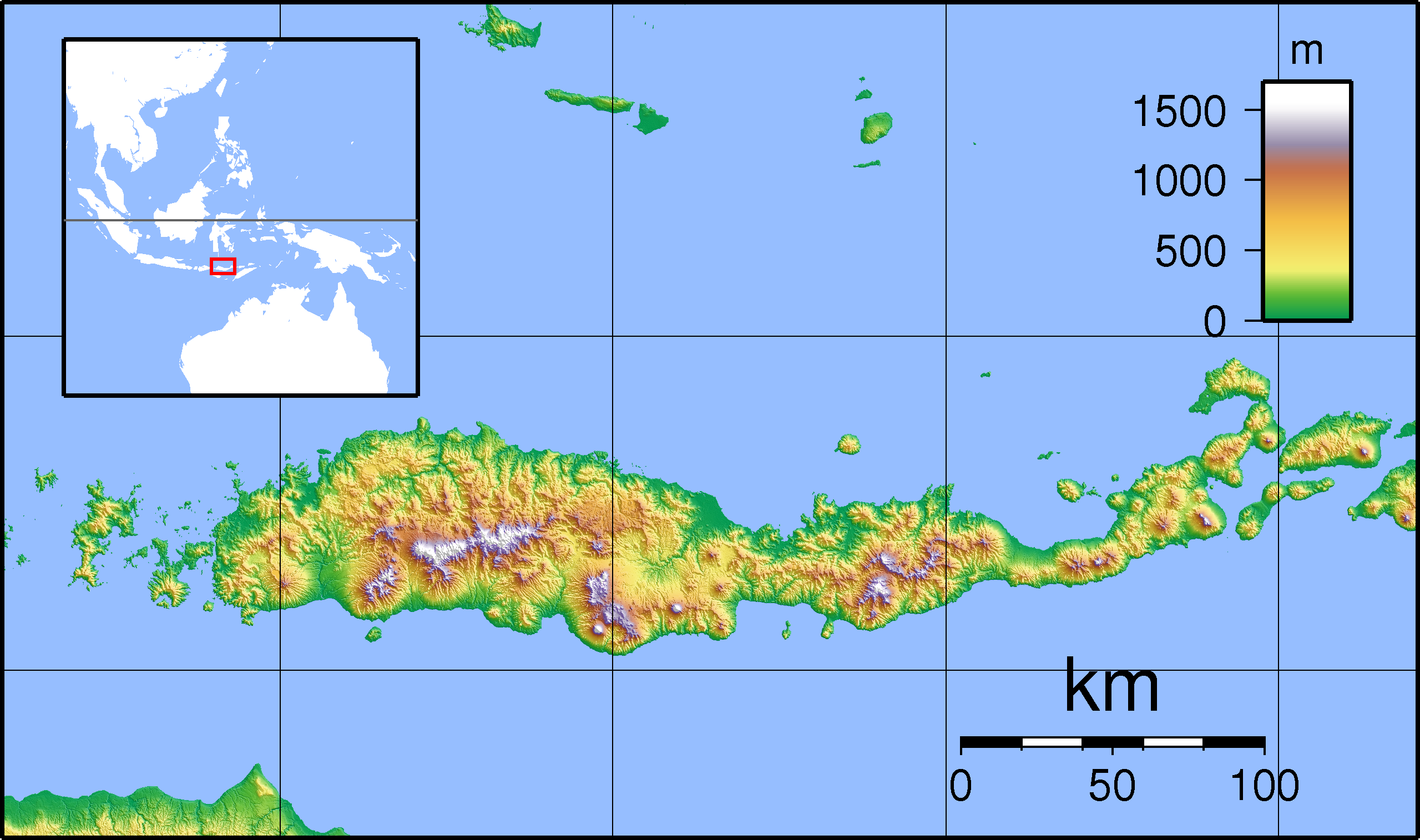
- Location within Flores Location within Indonesia
- UTC time: 1992-12-12 05:29:26
- ISC event: 257091
- USGS-ANSS: ComCat
- Local date: 12 December 1992; 33 years ago
- Local time: 13:29 WITA (Indonesia Central Standard Time)
- Magnitude: 7.7 M_{w}
- Depth: 27.7 km (17.2 mi)
- Epicenter: 8.480°S 121.896°E
- Areas affected: Flores; Indonesia
- Max. intensity: MMI IX (Violent)
- Peak acceleration: 1.086 g
- Peak velocity: 116.03 cm/s
- Tsunami: Yes (26 m (85 ft))
- Landslides: yes
- Aftershocks: 6.1 mb
- Casualties: 2,080 – 2,500 dead 500 – 2,144 injured

The 1992 Flores earthquake and tsunami occurred on 12 December on the island of Flores in Indonesia. With a magnitude of 7.7 and a maximum Mercalli intensity of IX (Violent), it was the largest and the deadliest earthquake in 1992 and in the Lesser Sunda Islands region, with at least 2,500 people killed. The earthquake generated an unusually large tsunami for its size; a submarine landslide may explain this phenomenon. Submarine rockfall was observed near the site of the earthquake. Observed runups (height above normal sea level) were mostly around 3–4 m (9.8–13.1 ft), with higher runups on Babi Island, Bou-Tanabeten, and Riangkroko village.

The earthquake was caused by slip on the Flores Thrust fault. This fault dips to the south underneath Flores Island, and is part of the back-arc thrust of Indonesia. The epicenters of most earthquakes on the Flores Thrust are on Flores Island. The area often experiences large earthquakes, with multiple impacting the area since 1992, such as the 2018 Lombok earthquakes, which were produced by the Flores thrust. The Flores thrust itself has produced at least six tsunamigenic earthquakes since 1800.

== Tectonic setting ==
A tectonic map of the Java area and areas further east.

Indonesia lies on the Pacific Ring of Fire, an area of significant volcanic and tectonic activity. The archipelago is located between the Eurasian, Pacific and Australian tectonic plates. The Flores area in particular contains both strike-slip faults and thrust faults. The Flores backthrust is north of the island arc of Indonesia, and is formed by the subduction of the Indo-Australian plate underneath the Eurasian plate west of Lombok while being formed by the Australian plate and Banda Arc south of Rote Island. It is characterized by intermediate-depth down-dip subduction. It is a part of the larger backthrust of the back-arc region of Indonesia. Earlier marine geophysical studies have suggested that the back-arc backthrust consists of two regions: the Wetar thrust and the Flores thrust. However, newer research suggests that the whole thrust is continuous, spanning a distance of about 2,000 km (1,200 mi). The Sunda and Australian plates converge at a rate of 80 mm/yr, in which the Sunda megathrust takes 70 mm/yr of the movement. The remaining 10 mm/yr rate is accommodated by the Flores back-arc thrust. It runs off the north coast of the Lesser Sunda Islands, in the Banda Sea.

The area is seismically active, with 79 earthquakes larger than M_{w}6.0 recorded in the area between 1900 and 2022. Eleven of those quakes generated tsunamis. In addition, the area has generated at least six tsunamigenic quakes of M_{s}>=6.5 since 1800. There exists substantial tsunami risk associated with the back-arc thrust of Indonesia. The lesser-studied eastern part of Indonesia has been hit by more tsunamis than the more-studied western part. Despite back-arc thrust tsunamis not being as common as megathrust tsunamis, they can still inflict severe damage. The eastern segment of the Flores thrust ruptured in the 1992 Flores earthquake, while the western segment has remained intact. However, the only instrumentally recorded quake caused by the Flores thrust was the 1992 quake.

== Earthquake ==
The earthquake was the result of shallow thrust faulting along a fault located in the back-arc region between the Sunda and Banda island arcs. The Flores Thrust represents a back-arc thrust fault that accommodated tectonic deformation between the Australian and Sunda plates. This structure runs for over 1,500 km (930 mi). Its eastern segment was responsible for producing the earthquake. The earthquake occurred at 05:29 UTC and was followed by several serious aftershocks. Extensive soil liquefaction was observed along the Flores Sea, including in the Maumere Port, where it caused "extensive damage". A peak ground acceleration of 1.0860 g and a peak ground velocity of 116.03 cm/s were observed. In total, 102 – 148 aftershocks with magnitudes above M_{w}3.0 were recorded. The largest recorded aftershock was rated mb6.1. It has been estimated that a 140 km × 40 km (87 mi × 25 mi) area with two major slip regions was ruptured in the quake.

== Tsunami ==
Damage caused by the tsunami

The tsunami was reported to have arrived within five minutes of the earthquake. Wave run-up heights of 3–4 m (9.8–13.1 ft) occurred along the eastern coast of Maumere. The maximum run-up height was measured at Riangkroko village at 26 m (85 ft); the tsunami killed 137 villagers. Located along the Nipah River, the tsunami traveled 600 m (2,000 ft) inland. It washed away the whole village and stripped away coconut trees, leaving only roots. In another village 6 km (3.7 mi) north, Bou-Tanabeten, the tsunami run-up was 12 m (39 ft). Along other locations hit by tsunamis on Flores Island, most trees remained standing. At Wuhring, a village 5 km (3.1 mi) from Maumere, 3 m (9.8 ft) waves swept through the village and killed 100 people. On Babi Island, the tsunami left human remains hanging on trees; 263 deaths occurred on the island, representing nearly a quarter of the island's population, and two villages were badly damaged. The maximum run-up on the island was recorded at 7.3 m (24 ft). Wave reflection off Flores Island may have partly contributed to the tsunami's destructive effects on Babi Island. Babi Island was likely inundated by two separate tsunami episodes. The earthquake produced the deadliest and largest tsunami in the Flores Sea area in modern history.

The tsunami has been described as having "enormous size", suggesting a potential submarine landslide. Major subaqueous slumping was observed near Leworaharag. In addition, there exists evidence of a submarine landslide or rockslide caused by the earthquake. Seismic stratigraphy was used to identify two areas of submarine rockfall likely caused by the earthquake. Submarine landslide-induced tsunamis have occurred in the past in Indonesia, with one notable example being the 1674 Ambon earthquake and megatsunami.

== Aftermath and relief efforts ==
At least 2,500 people were killed or went missing near Flores, including 1,490 at Maumere and 700 on Babi. More than 500 people were injured and 90,000 were left homeless. 30,000 homes were destroyed in the earthquake. 19 people were killed and 130 houses were destroyed on Kalaotoa. Damage was assessed at approximately US$100 million. Approximately 90% of the buildings were destroyed at Maumere, the hardest-hit town, by the earthquake and ensuing tsunami while 50% to 80% of the structures on Flores were damaged or destroyed. Electricity in the general area and the port of Maumere was shut down. Maumere's hospital was completely destroyed, and patients were treated in tents. Damage also occurred on Sumba and Alor.

The Indonesian government sent rescue and relief missions to earthquake-stricken areas and declared the earthquake a national disaster through Presidential Decree (Keppres) Number 66 of 1992, due to its widespread impact and the need for cross-ministerial response and international assistance. The Indonesian Air Force provided assistance, mostly transporting medicine and clothing. Malaria and influenza rose significantly after the disaster. Babi Island survivors were evacuated since all the houses on the island were destroyed. International relief efforts were hindered by the onset of the rainy season. The Indonesian government also requested assistance from the international community. Agencies such as the Asian Development Bank, along with the World Bank, the Australian Agency for International Development, the Japanese Overseas Cooperation Fund, and others, made a coordinated effort to support reconstruction.

== See also ==
- 5 August 2018 Lombok earthquake
- 2026 Flores earthquake
- List of earthquakes in 1992
- List of earthquakes in Indonesia
