= Banjar, Buleleng =

Coordinates: 8.189747°S 114.968328°E

Location within Buleleng

Banjar is an administrative district (kecamatan) in Buleleng Regency in northern Bali, Indonesia.

A notable waterfall, Singsing Waterfall, is located in the district, Tigawasa, in the village of Temukus, around 3 km south-east of Lovina Beach and 10 km south-west of Singaraja town.

In the village of Banjar Tegeha near the town of Banjar, is the Brahma Arama Vihara Temple, also known as the Banjar Buddhist Temple, the largest Buddhist temple in Bali.
Another Buddhist site in the district is the "Candi Buddha Kalibukbuk", in the village of Kaliasem (just west of Kalibukbuk).

== Towns and Villages ==
The district is sub-divided into 17 rural villages (desa) - all sharing the post code 81152 - as follows:

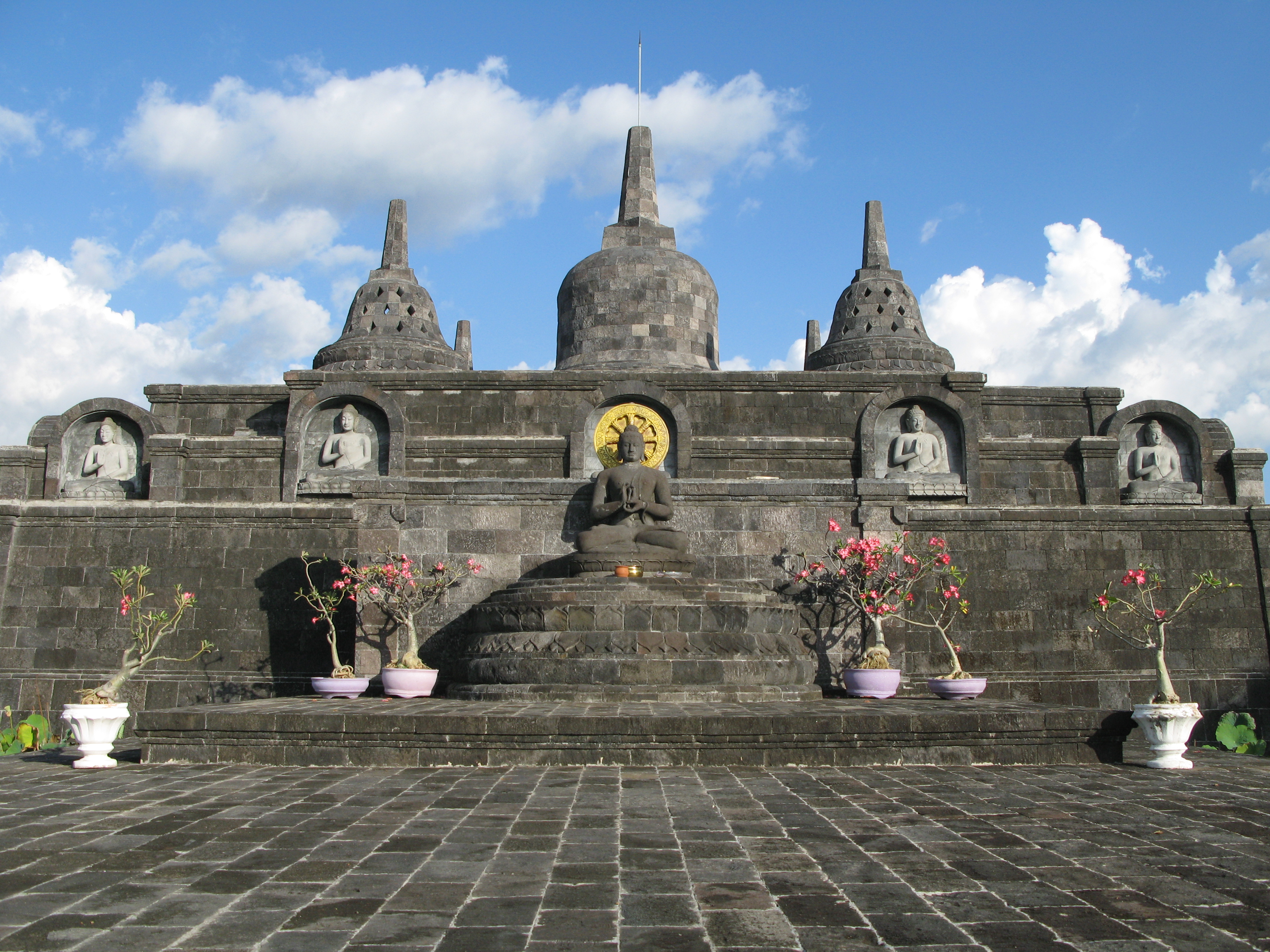
Brahmavihara-Arama, Buddhist temple in Banjar, Buleleng

- 2001 Banyuseri
- 2002 Tirtasari
- 2003 Kayuputih
- 2004 Banyuatis
- 2005 Gesing
- 2006 Munduk
- 2007 Gobleg
- 2008 Pedawa
- 2009 Cempaga
- 2010 Sidetapa
- 2011 Tampekan
- 2012 Banjar Tegeha
- 2013 Banjar (desa)
- 2014 Dencarik
- 2015 Temukus
- 2016 Tigawasa
- 2017 Kaliasem
