= 1815 Bali earthquake =

1815 natural disaster in Indonesia

- Location within Indonesia Location within Bali
- Local date: November 22, 1815
- Local time: 22:00-23:00 WITA
- Magnitude: M_{w} 7.3
- Depth: 27 km (17 mi)
- Epicenter: 8.0°S 115.0°E
- Fault: Flores back-arc thrust fault
- Max. intensity: MMI IX (Violent)
- Tsunami: Yes
- Casualties: 11,453 dead

The 1815 Bali earthquake occurred on November 22 between 22:00 and 23:00 local time (WITA), affecting the Bali Kingdom. The estimated moment magnitude 7.0 earthquake struck off the north coast of Bali at a shallow depth. It was assigned a maximum intensity of IX (Violent) on the Mercalli intensity scale, causing severe damage in Buleleng and Tabanan. The earthquake caused a landslide and tsunami that killed 11,453 people.

== Geology ==
Off the north coast of Bali is the Flores back-arc thrust fault, located in the back-arc region. It formed due to the convergence between the Sunda and Australian plates, accommodating compression. The two plates converge northward at a rate of 80 mm (3.1 in)/yr, in which the Sunda megathrust takes 70 mm (2.8 in)/yr of the movement. The remaining 10 mm (0.39 in)/yr rate is accommodated by the Flores Back Arc Thrust Fault. It runs off the north coast of the Lesser Sunda Islands, in the Banda Sea. The fault extends east–west for 800 km (500 mi) off the north coast of Bali to Wetar. Geologists postulate the fault is divided into two segments; the 450 km (280 mi)-long Flores Thrust, and 450 km (280 mi)-long Wetar Thrust. Its origin has been attributed to several causes proposed by researchers; magmatic intrusion, gravitational sliding, reverse subduction or active spreading in the back-arc. It is a complex zone of thrust faults that are connected at depth.

== Earthquake characteristics ==
The earthquake and tsunami is thought to be the result of a thrust fault rupture on the Flores back-arc thrust fault. The fault was the source of approximately 26 magnitude 6.0+ earthquakes since 1960. These earthquakes were calculated to be at depths of up to 40 km (25 mi) beneath the crust. It was also the source of the 1992 and 2018 earthquakes that caused many fatalities. The 1815 event is the earliest documented earthquake along the fault. Modelling of a moment magnitude 7.3 earthquake at 10 km (6.2 mi) depth could produce Modified Mercalli intensity VIII–IX along the north central and eastern parts of Bali. Modified Mercalli intensity V in Surabaya corresponded to the historical descriptions of the event. On Lombok, the earthquake was felt VII.

== Damage ==
The earthquake occurred at 22:00 local time. In Buleleng shaking was described as violent; then followed by aftershocks that persisted for an hour. Shaking was felt in Bima, Surabaya, and Lombok. A massive "explosion" was observed along the coastal ranges which triggered a landslide. The landslide buried Singaraja and Buleleng, resulting in at least 10,253 fatalities. A large On Lake Tamblingan, a fissure extended from Buleleng to Tabanan. This agitated the lake and caused flooding.

These reported explosions were due to the mountainside collapsing during the earthquake. Heavy rainfall prior to the earthquake also destabalized these mountain slopes which contributed to the landslide. The landslide carried rocks 15 to 30 m (49 to 98 ft) across; it travelled down the Banyumala River and increased its volume while gathering river debris. Dutch official Bloemen Waanders reported the flow depth at 3 to 3.6 m (9.8 to 11.8 ft) while Gusti Panji Sakti said it was 6 to 12 m (20 to 39 ft). According to Waanders, 17 villages were engulfed by the flow.

A destructive tsunami also washed onto the Balinese coast, killing an additional 1,200 people. The tsunami was triggered by the flows entering the sea along the coast. It devastated several villages but no tsunami was reported on nearby Lombok and Java. Sakti estimated the tsunami run-up at 2 to 3 m (6 ft 7 in to 9 ft 10 in). The coastal buildings of Buleleng harbor in Pabean District were swept away.

== See also ==
- List of historical earthquakes
- List of earthquakes in Indonesia
- 1917 Bali earthquake
