= Brahmavihara-Arama =

Buddhist temple in Indonesia

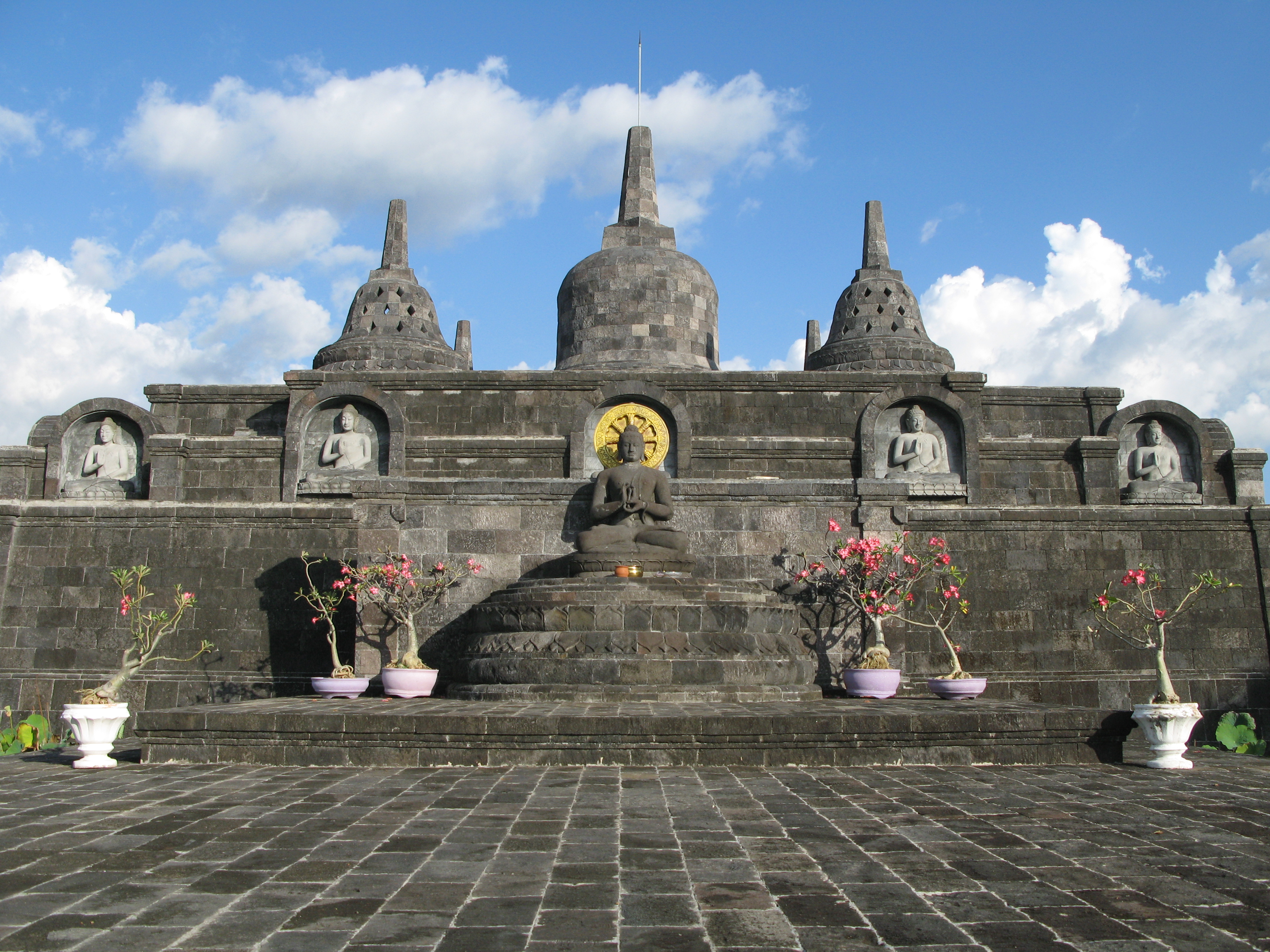

- Location within Indonesia

Religion
- Affiliation: Buddhist

Location
- Country: Indonesia
- Interactive map of Brahmavihara-Arama
- Coordinates: 08°12′39″S 114°58′27″E

Architecture
- Founder: Bhante Giri
- Completed: 1969

Website
- http://brahmaviharaarama.com

Brahmavihara-Arama (Balinese: ᬩ᭄ᬭᬄᬫᬯ᬴ᬶᬳᬭᬅᬭᬫ), also known as Vihara Buddha Banjar (Balinese: ᬯ᬴ᬶᬳᬭᬩᬸᬤ᭄ᬟᬩᬜ᭄ᬚ᭄ᬭᬃ) due to its location in the Banjar District of Buleleng, is a Buddhist temple and monastery in the mountains near Lovina in North Bali, Indonesia.

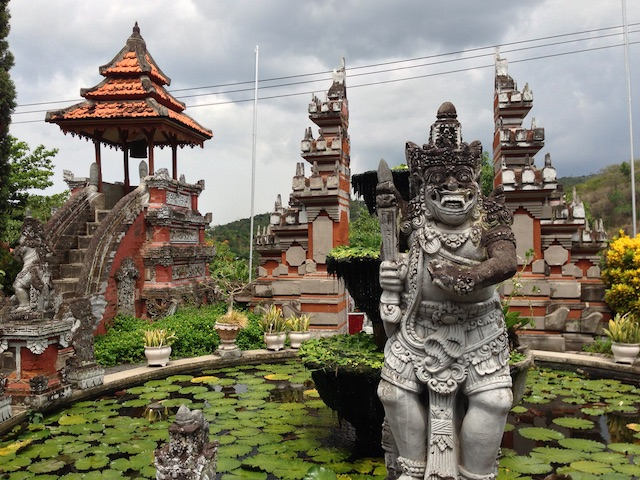

Due to its location within Bali—a predominantly Hindu island—this temple has significant Hindu influence in its statues and architecture.
