= Lovina Beach =

Lovina
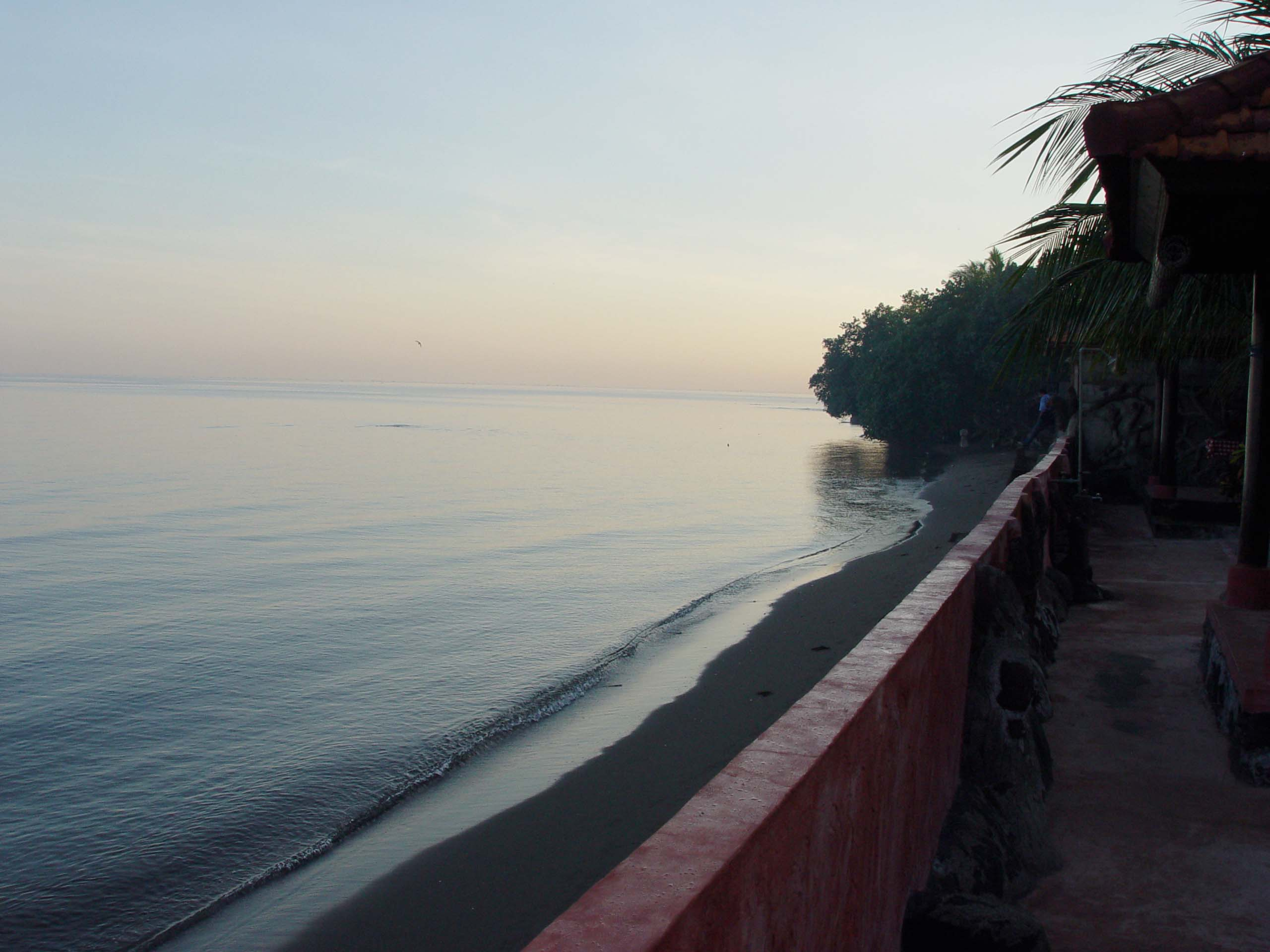
- Lovina Beach at dawn

- Location in Bali
- Coordinates: 8°9′45.01″S 115°1′32.38″E
- Country: Indonesia
- Province: Bali
- Regency: Buleleng

Lovina Beach (or often simply Lovina) is a beach on the northwestern side of the island of Bali, Indonesia.

== Geography ==
The beach is in the territory of Kaliasem village, in Banjar district in Buleleng Regency (capital Singaraja). It takes its name from a home owned by Pandji Tisna (1908-1978), a Regent of Buleleng and pioneer of tourism to Bali in the early 1950s.

For touristic purposes, the coastal strip stretches from 5 km (3 miles) west of the town of Singaraja to 15 km (10 miles) west. This area includes the small villages (from east to west) of Pemaron, Tukad Mungga, Anturan (Buleleng district), Banyualit (Banjar district), Kalibukbuk (Buleleng district), Kaliasem and Temukus (Banjar district). Although it has become more popular with tourists, it remains far quieter than the tourist hotspots of the island's south side.

Popular activities for visitors include diving, snorkeling, and early-morning boat trips off the coast to see dolphins. These dolphin sighting trips usually last about two hours, and generally cost anywhere between 60,000–250,000 Indonesian rupiah, or about US$5–$20.

== Coral and reef restoration ==
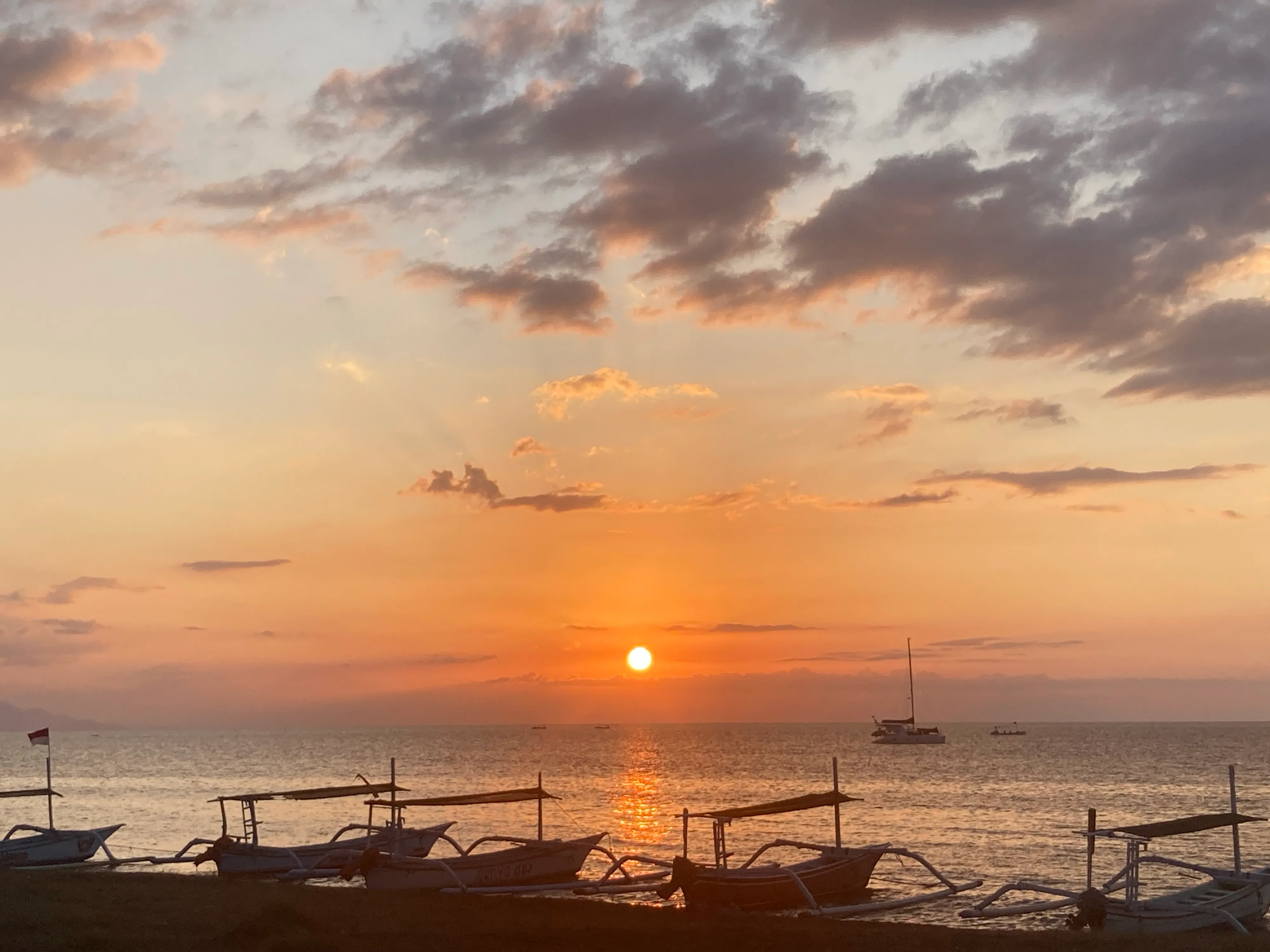
Docked boats at the beach under the setting sun.

Lovina is one of Bali's five sites benefiting from the largest coral restoration project in the world (as of 2021): the Indonesian Coral Reef Garden (ICRG) intends to install altogether just under one million structural units. The project is funded by the Maritime Affairs and Fisheries Ministry, to the tune of $7.5m. At Lovina, 1,000 ‘bio-rocks’ (large concrete and metal bells with holes to attach hard coral) have been built and installed by 250 locals, out of work since the pandemic. The local team, who started its work as a small group of people in 2019, also takes care of the nursery that was implemented as one of the first moves; they take in international volunteers, run awareness programs, monitor and document the evolution of the site, experiment on different methods for planting coral, hunt coral predators, pick up trash underwater...

Aerial views of the coastline of Lovina.

This project also aims at reducing unemployement by planning for supervision and maintenance work of the sites, an undertaking that corresponds to the largest and more costly part of reef regeneration. Long-term monitoring has so far been implemented only for very few such operations, and is required to build a workable database needed to increase general knowledge on the process and increase success for future coral projects. Tries Razak, from Java’s IPB University, explains in 2021 that “Growing coral is not growing trees, where you plant it and it will grow. The science is still very fuzzy. It might be successful in one spot but two metres away, the hydro-dynamic factors or supply of larvae will be slightly different and it won’t work there. And as most of the restoration projects in Indonesia are being done without preliminary studies, artificial reefs are not planted in places where they are needed most.”

== Gallery ==
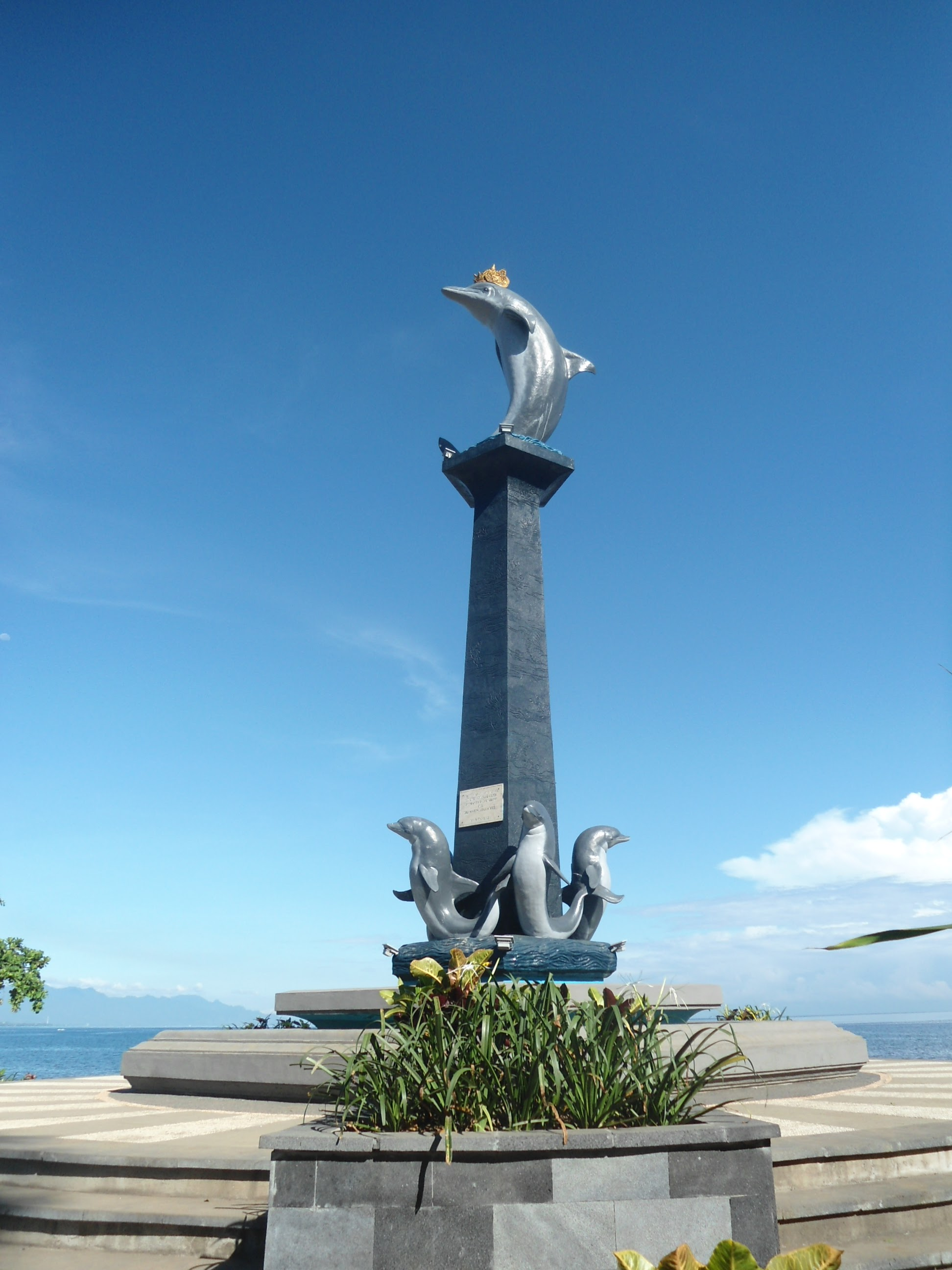
Dolphin Statue, Kalibukbuk

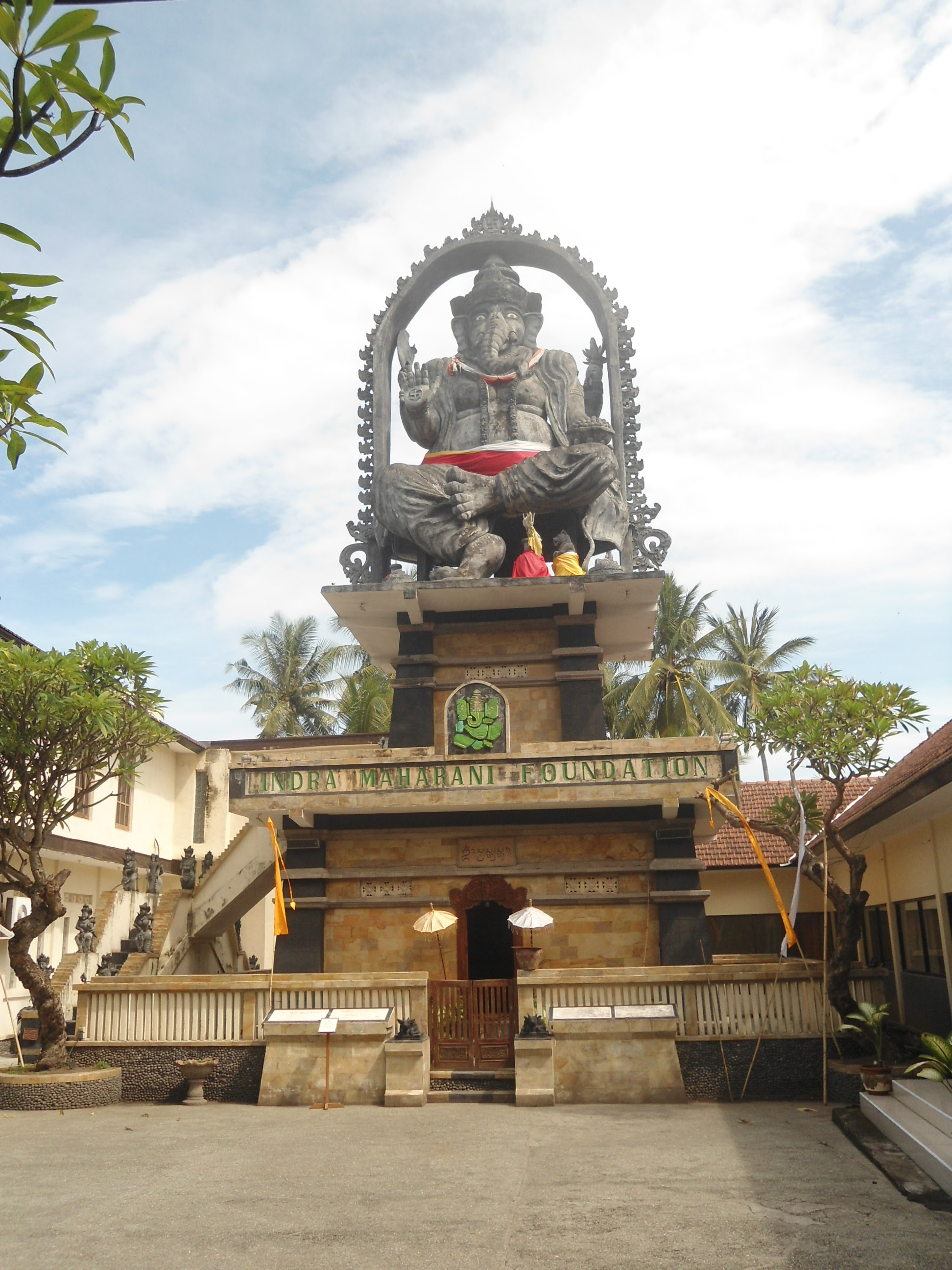
Sri Maha Ganesha Statue, Kalibukbuk

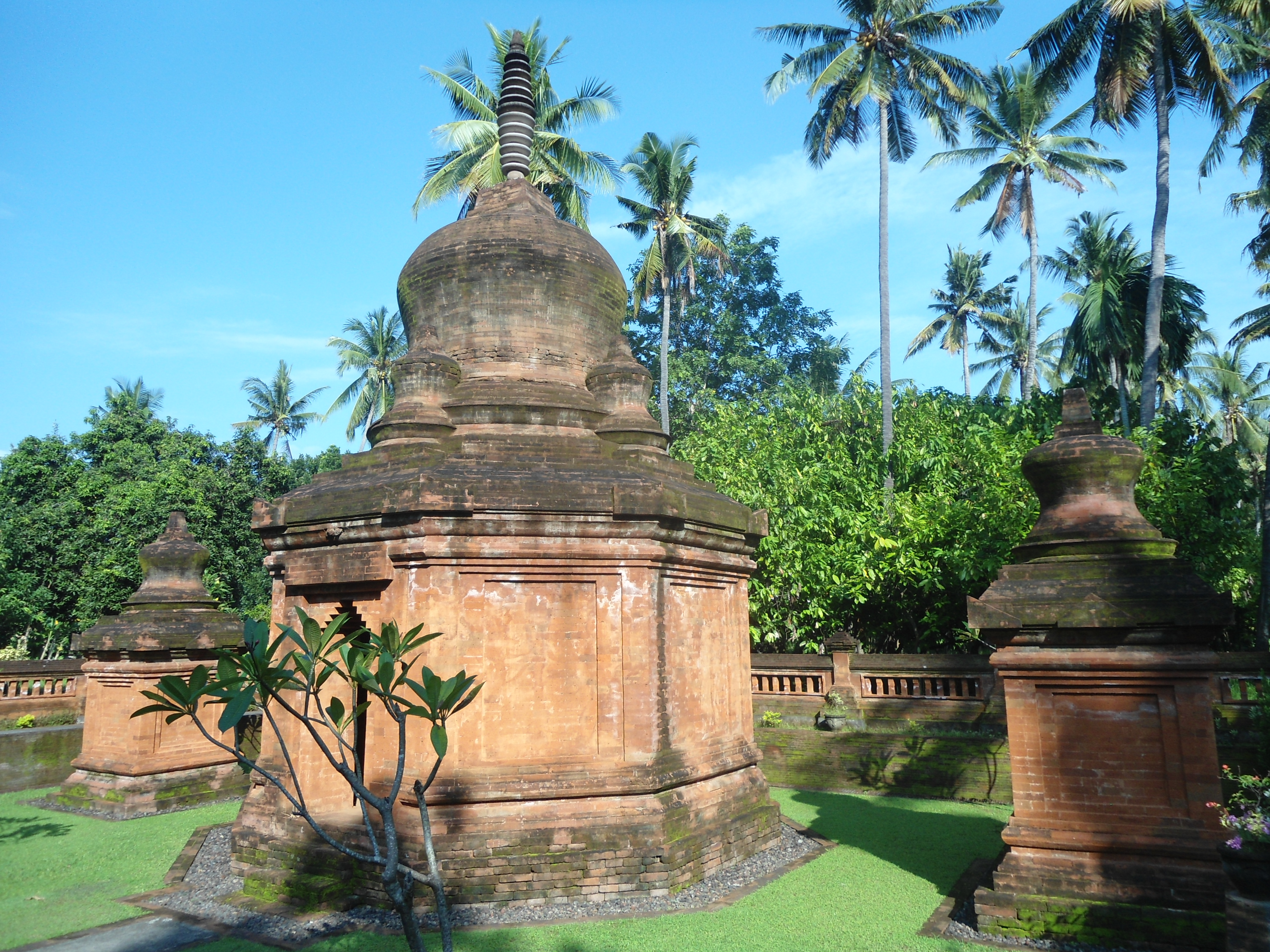
Candi Stupa Kalibukbuk

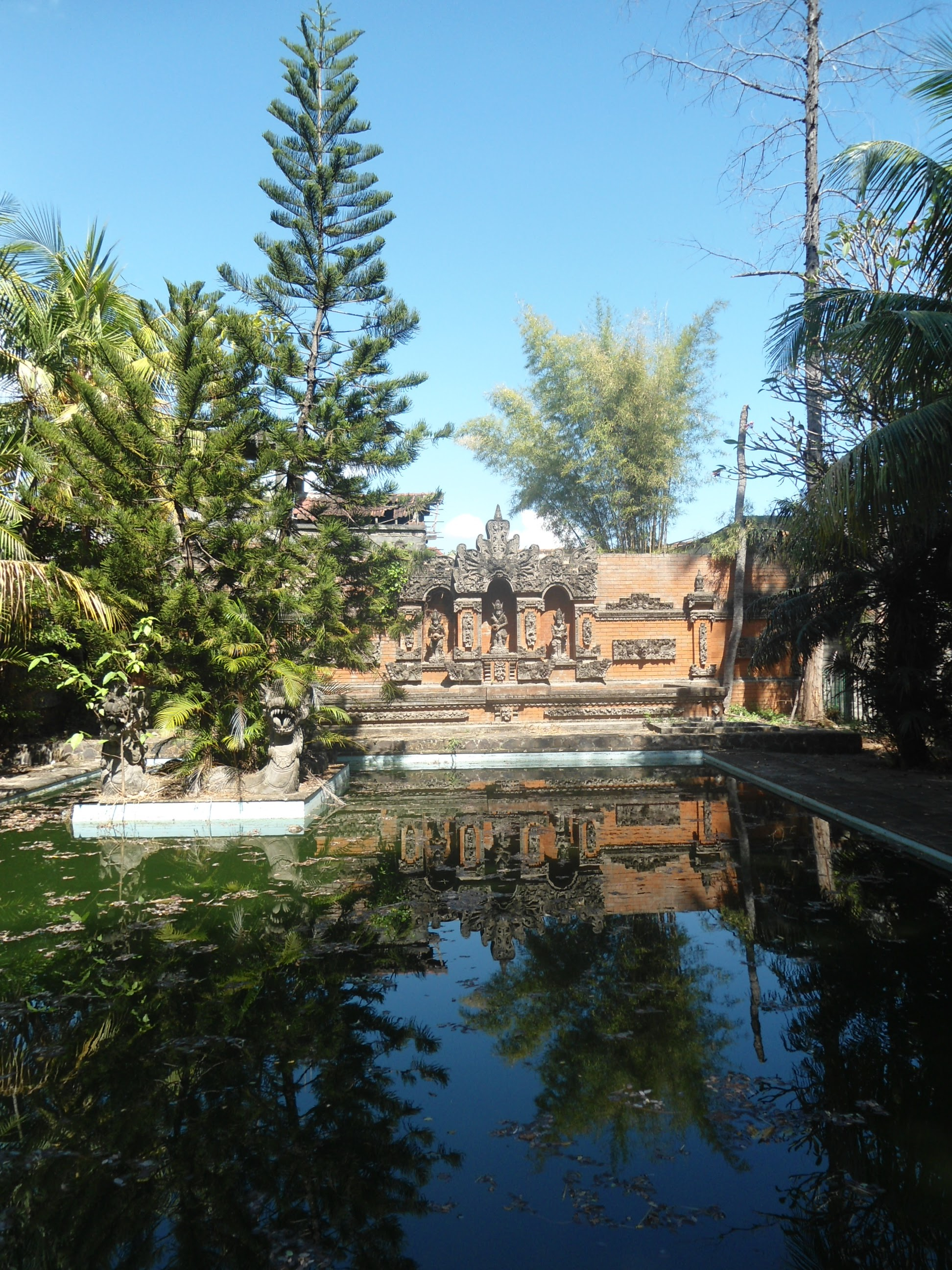
Kaliasem Palace

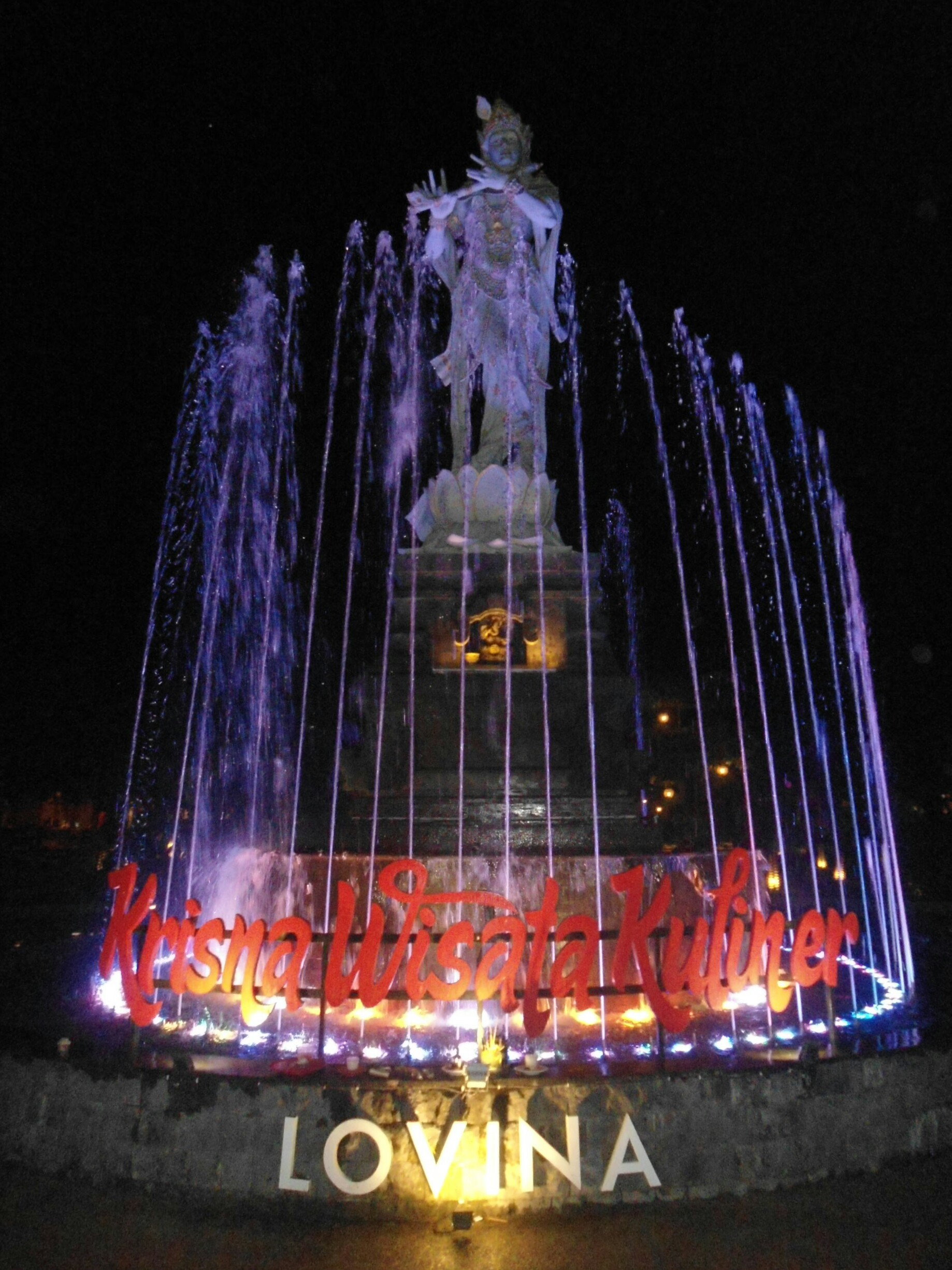
Krisna Statue, Temukus

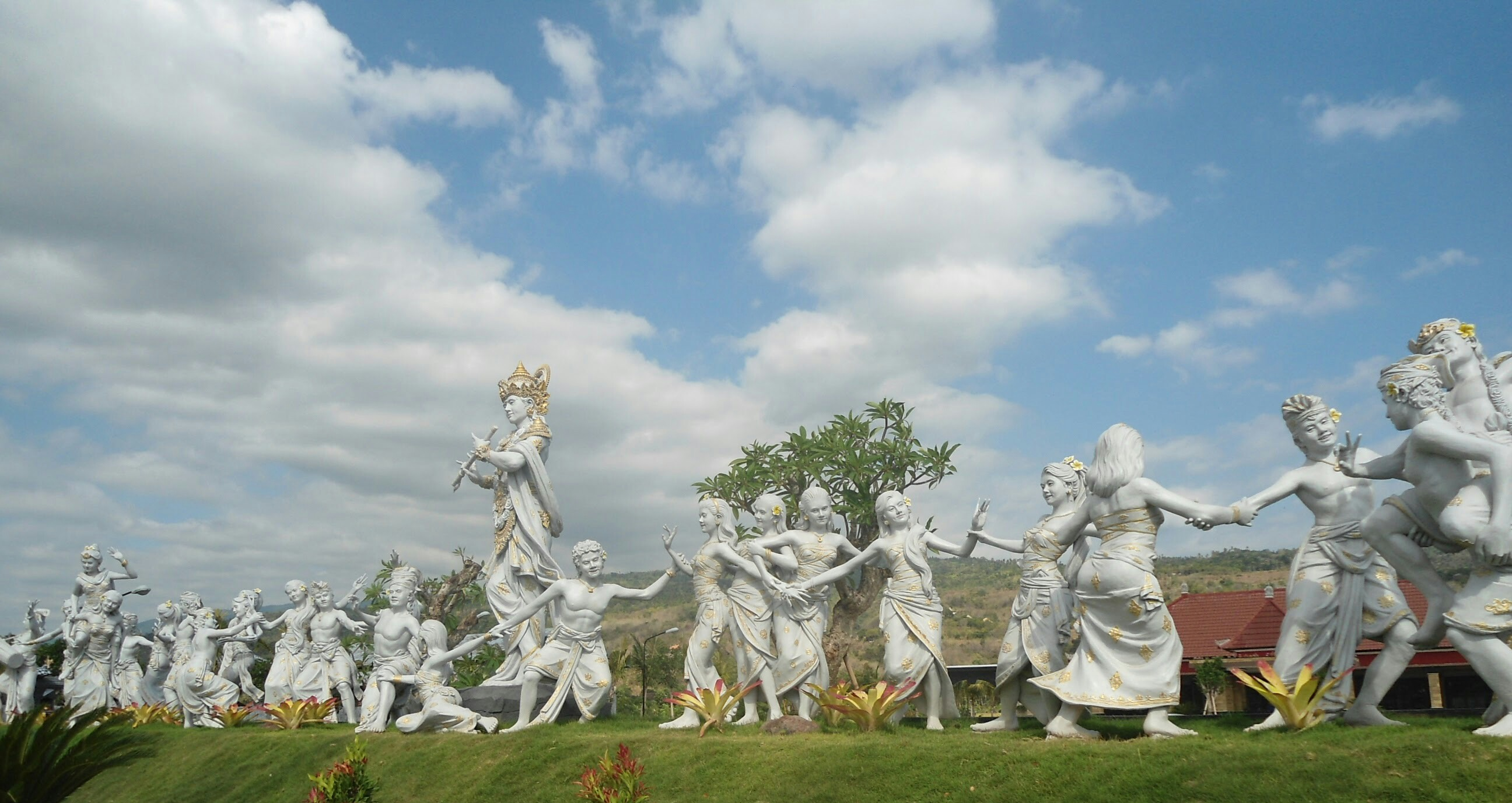
Krisna Lila Statue, Temukus

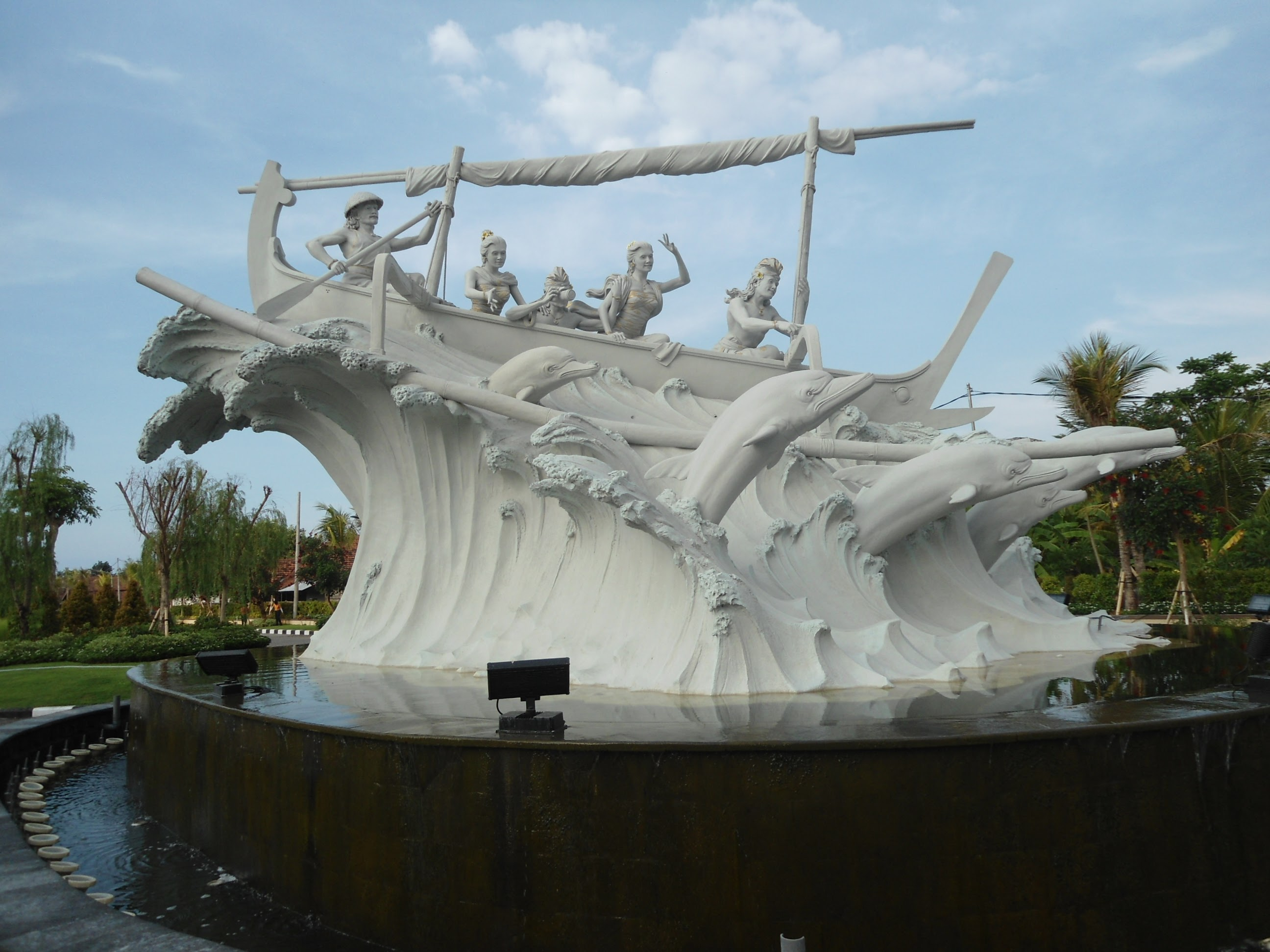
Dolphin Tour Statue, Temukus

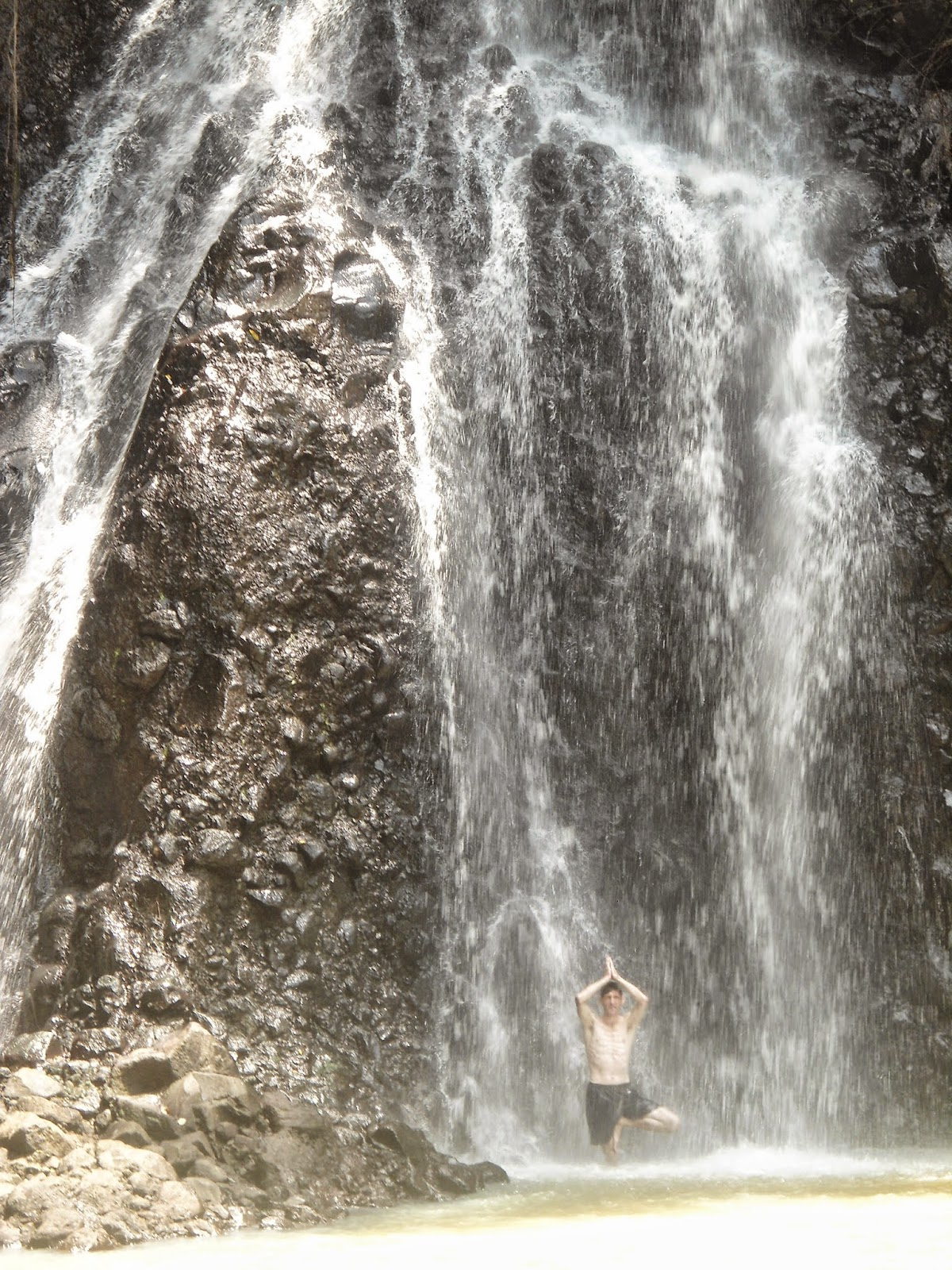
Sing Sing Waterfall, Temukus
