= Buleleng, Bali =

District in Buleleng Regency, Bali Province, Indonesia

Location within Buleleng

Buleleng is an administrative district (kecamatan) in Buleleng Regency, on Bali, Indonesia. Its capital is the town of Singaraja, although the urban area of which Singaraja is the centre includes the entire district, which covers 46.25 km^{2}, and in mid 2025 had a population of 156,261.

== Towns and Villages in Buleleng District ==
The district is sub-divided into 29 towns and villages, of which 17 are administered as urban kelurahan and 12 as rural desa. They are listed with their areas and their populations as at mid 2025, together with their post codes. The kelurahan, with a combined population of 94,806 as at mid 2025, are distinguished by an asterisk (*) after their name. The first five desa listed below are situated along the coast west of the urban area, running from west to east, with a combined population of 31,856 in mid 2025; it forms the eastern part of Lovina Beach. The last seven desa listed below are situated east of the urban area, with a combined population of 29,599 in mid 2025.

Kode Wilayah	Name of village	Area (km^{2})	Pop'n 2025 Estimate	Post code
51.08.06.2001	Kalibukbuk	3.23	7,363	81119
51.08.06.2002	Anturan	2.84	6,770	81119
51.08.06.2003	Tukadmungga	2.20	5,275	81119
51.08.06.2004	Pemaron	1.48	5,593	81119
51.08.06.2005	Baktiseraga	2.35	6,855	81119
51.08.06.1006	Banyuasri *	1.91	9,684	81116
51.08.06.1007	Banjar Tegal *	0.76	4,197	81117
51.08.06.1009	Paket Agung *	0.83	2,731	81118
51.08.06.1012	Beratan *	0.28	964	81119
51.08.06.1011	Liligundi *	0.40	1,804	81119
51.08.06.1010	Kampung Singaraja *	0.03	1,305	81111
51.08.06.1008	Kendran *	0.35	2,930	81112
51.08.06.1022	Astina *	0.22	2,549	81112
51.08.06.1023	Banjar Jawa *	0.55	5,680	81113
51.08.06.1027	Banjar Bali *	0.18	2,727	81113

Kode Wilayah	Name of village	Area (km^{2})	Pop'n 2025 Estimate	Post code
51.08.06.1021	Kampung Kajanan *	0.19	5,408	81114
51.08.06.1024	Kaliuntu *	0.70	4,705	81116
51.08.06.1025	Kampung Anyar *	0.22	6,294	81115
51.08.06.1026	Kampung Bugis *	0.18	3,677	81115
51.08.06.1029	Kampung Baru *	0.61	8,528	81114
51.08.06.1019	Banyuning *	5.21	19,014	81119
51.08.06.1020	Penarukan *	4.01	12,627	81119
51.08.06.2018	Jinengdalam	2.48	5,896	81119
51.08.06.2028	Penglatan	2.49	5,111	81119
51.08.06.2015	Petandakan	1.70	2,717	81119
51.08.06.2013	Sari Mekar	2.44	4,097	81119
51.08.06.2014	Nagasepaha	0.88	1,944	81119
51.08.06.2016	Alasangker	5.06	6,432	81119
51.08.06.2017	Poh Bergong	2.46	3,402	81119
Totals for	District	46.25	156,261	

U:

- Alasangker
- Anturan, Buleleng
- Astina
- Banjar Bali
- Banjar Jawa
- Banjar Tegal
- Banyuasari (Banyuasri)
- Banyuning
- Beratan
- Bhakti Seraga (Baktiseraga)
- Jinengdalem
- Kalibukbuk
- Kaliuntu
- Kampung Anyar
- Kampung Baru
- Kampung Bugis
- Kampung Kajanan
- Kampung Singaraja
- Kendran
- Liligundi
- Naga Sepaha (Nagasepaha)
- Paket Agung
- Pemaron
- Penarukan
- Penglatan
- Petandakan
- Poh Bergong (Poh Bengong)
- Sarimekar (Sari Mekar)
- Tukadmungga
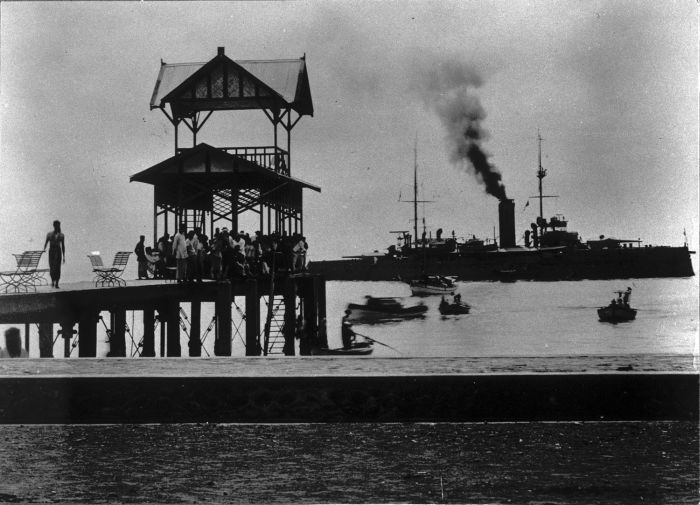
Mailboat by Boeleleng (1920–1921)

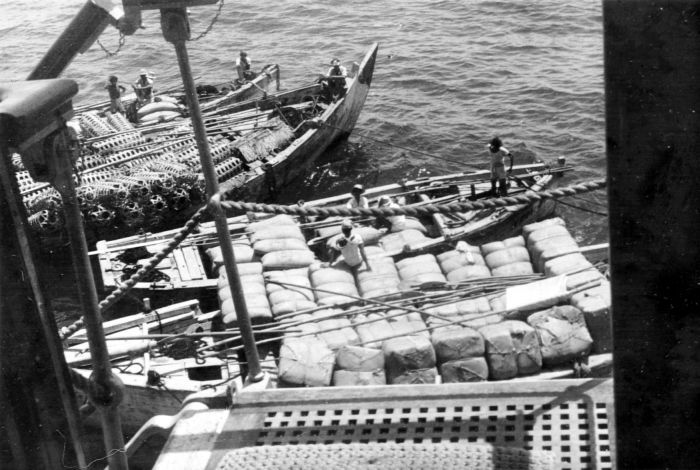
Proas with rubber bales to be loaded on M.S. Kalianget for Koninklijke Paketvaart-Maatschappij (KPM) Dutch shipping company (1949)

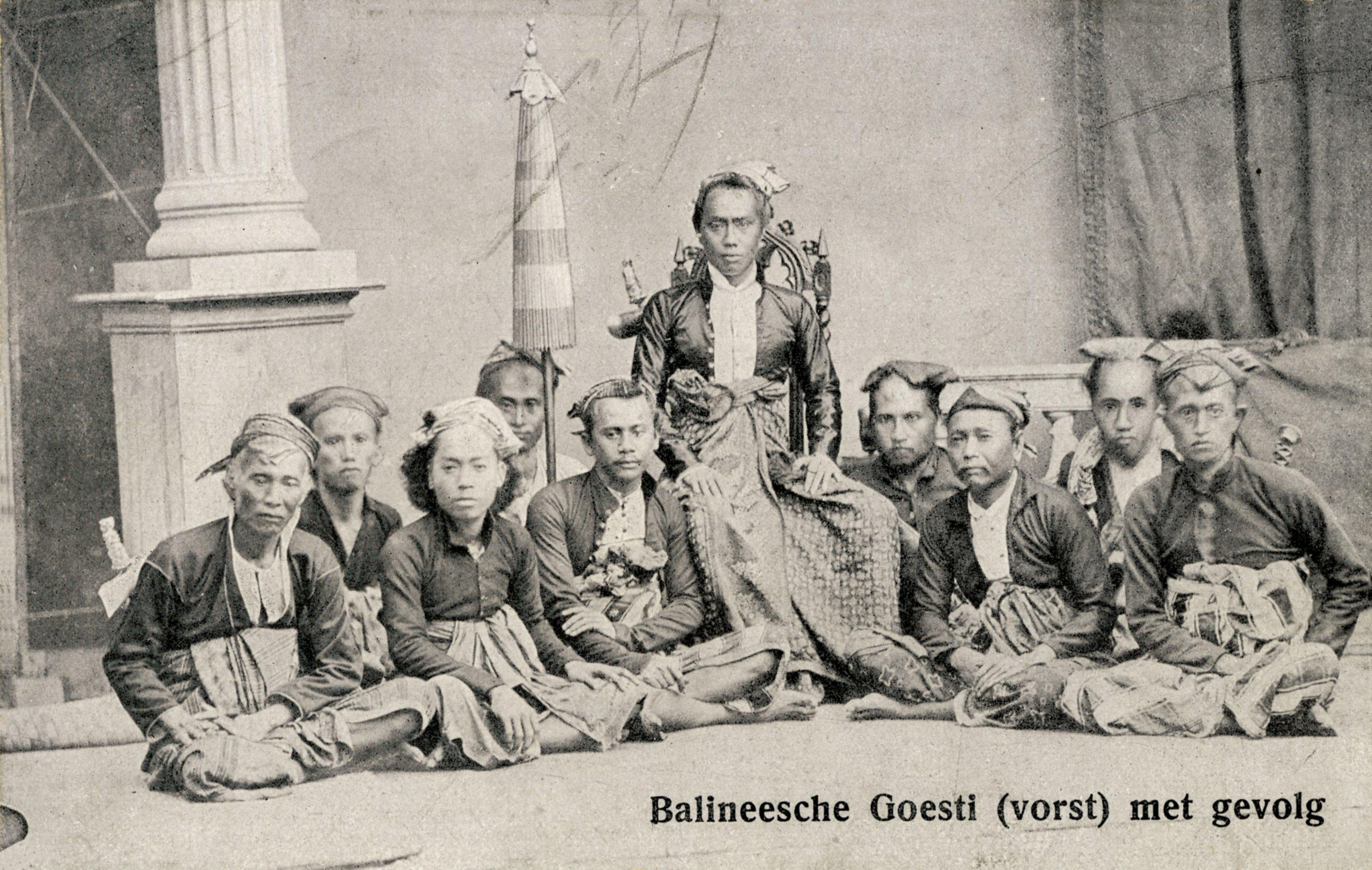
Raja of Buleleng Goesti Ngoera Ketoet Djilantik with his retinue (Bogor) during his visit to Governor General L.A.J.W. Sloet van de Beele (1864)
