= Submarine landslide =

Landslides that transport sediment across the continental shelf and into the deep ocean

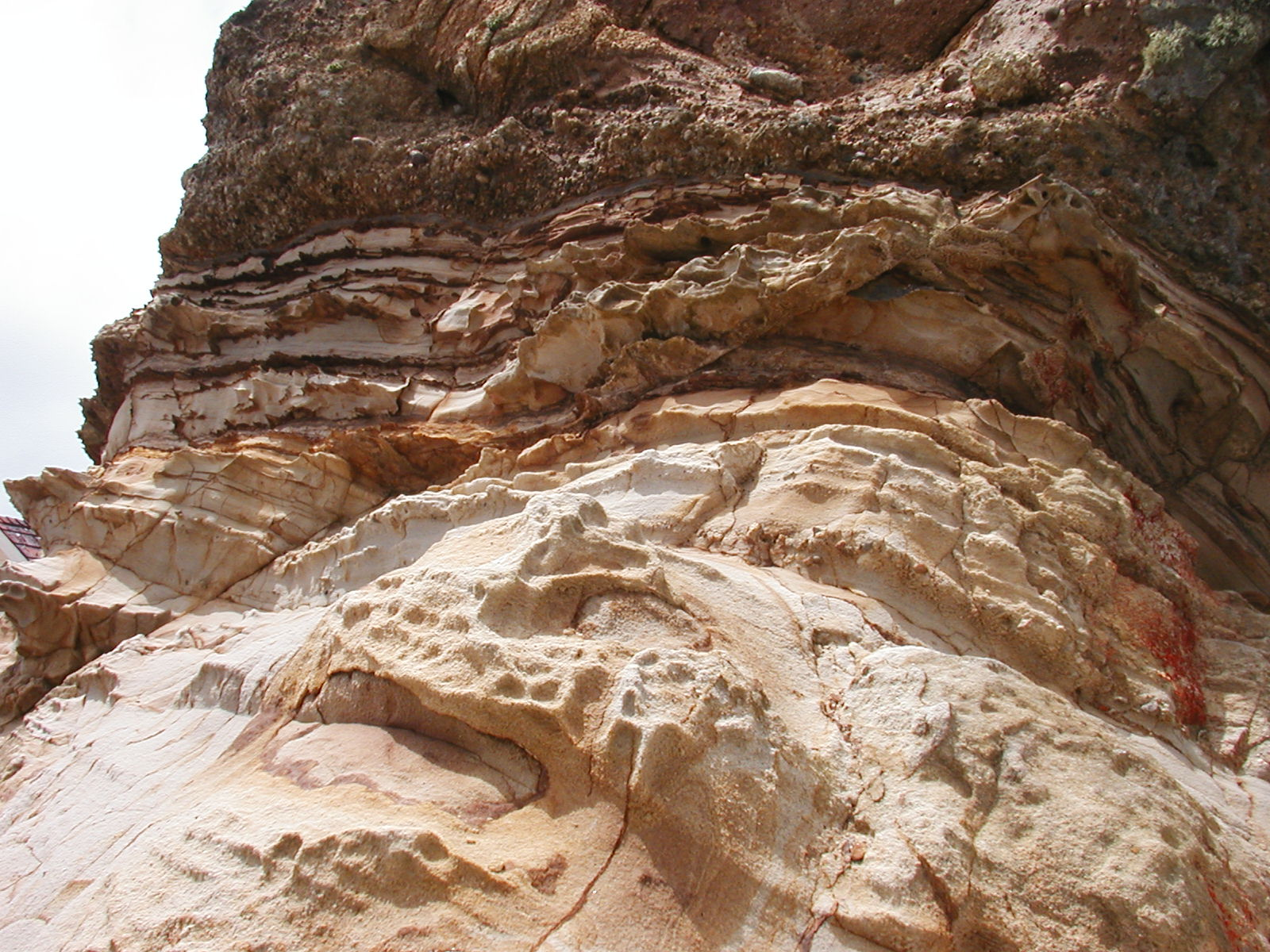
Conglomerate rock located at Point Reyes, California. Deposited by a submarine landslide, the rock is an example of a turbidite.

Submarine landslides are marine landslides that transport sediment across the continental shelf and into the deep ocean. A submarine landslide is initiated when the downwards driving stress (gravity and other factors) exceeds the resisting stress of the seafloor slope material, causing movements along one or more concave to planar rupture surfaces. Submarine landslides take place in a variety of different settings, including planes as low as 1°, and can cause significant damage to both life and property. Recent advances have been made in understanding the nature and processes of submarine landslides through the use of sidescan sonar and other seafloor mapping technology.

== Causes ==
Submarine landslides have different causes which relate to both the geological attributes of the landslide material and transient environmental factors affecting the submarine environment. Common causes of landslides include: i) presence of weak geological layers, ii) overpressure due to rapid accumulation of sedimentary deposits, iii) earthquakes, iv) storm wave loading and hurricanes, v) gas hydrate dissociation, vi) groundwater seepage and high pore water pressure, vii) glacial loading, viii) volcanic island growth, and ix) oversteepening.

=== Weak geological layers ===
The presence of weak geological layers is a factor which contributes to submarine landslides at all scales. This has been confirmed by seafloor imaging such as swath bathymetric mapping and 3D seismic reflection data. Despite their ubiquity, very little is known about the nature and characteristics of the weak geological layers, as they have rarely been sampled and very little geotechnical work has been conducted on them. An example of a slide which was caused by weak geological layers is the Storegga Slide, near Norway which had a total volume of 3,300 km^{3}.

=== Overpressuring ===
Overpressure due to rapid deposition of sediment is closely related to weak geological layers. An example of landslides caused by overpressure due to rapid deposition occurred in 1969 on the Mississippi River Delta after Hurricane Camile struck the region.

=== Earthquakes ===
Earthquakes are a key factor which trigger most major submarine landslides. Earthquakes provide significant environmental stresses and can promote elevated pore water pressure which leads to failure. Earthquakes triggered the Grand Banks landslide of 1929, where a 20 km^{3} submarine landslide was initiated after an earthquake. In the Mediterranean Sea, most submarine landslides on record appear to occur due to earthquakes or slope erosion, as in the development of submarine canyons.

=== Stormwave loading ===
Stormwave loading and hurricanes can lead to submarine landslides in shallow regions and were recognised as one of the factors which contributed to the slides which occurred on the Mississippi Delta in 1969 following Hurricane Camille.

=== Gas hydrates ===
A number of studies have indicated that gas hydrates lie beneath many submarine slopes and can contribute to the triggering of a landslide. Gas hydrates are ice-like substances consisting of water and natural gas, which are stable at the temperature and pressure conditions normally found on the seabed. When the temperature rises or the pressure drops the gas hydrate becomes unstable allowing some of the hydrate to dissociate and discharge bubble phase natural gas. If pore water flow is impeded then this gas charging leads to excess pore water pressure and decreased slope stability. Gas hydrate dissociation is thought to have contributed to slides at water depths of 1000 to 1300 m off the east coast of the United States and the Storegga slide off the east coast of Norway.

=== Groundwater seepage ===
Groundwater seepage and elevated pore water pressure can cause submarine landslides. Elevated pore water pressure causes reduced frictional resistance to sliding and can result from normal depositional processes, or can be coupled with other causes such as earthquakes, gas hydrate dissociation and glacial loading.

=== Glacial loading ===
Sediment failure on glacial margins as a result of glacial loading is common and operates on a wide spectrum of dimensions, ranging from relatively small scale mass wasting processes in fjords to large scale slides covering several thousand square kilometres. Factors which are significant in glacial loading induced landslides are the flexing of crust due to the loading and unloading of a fluctuating ice front, variation in drainage and groundwater seepage, quick deposition of low plasticity silts, rapid formation of moraines and till above hemipelagic interstaidal sediments. An example where glacial loading leads to submarine landsliding is the Nyk slide of northern Norway.

=== Volcanic island growth ===
Slope failures due to volcanic island growth are among the largest on earth, involving volumes of several cubic kilometres. The failure occurs as large bodies of lava form above weak marine sediments which are prone to failure. Failure is particularly common on edifices which are over 2500 m but rare on edifices which are less than 2500 m. Variation in the behaviour of the slides is significant, with some slides barely keeping up with the growth on the upper part of the volcano while others may surge forward great distances, attaining landslide lengths greater than 200 km. Volcanic island submarine landslides occur in places such as the Hawaiian Islands and the Cape Verde Islands.

=== Oversteepening ===
Oversteepening is caused by scouring due to oceanic currents and can result in the triggering of submarine landslides.

In some cases the relationship between the cause and the resulting landslide can be quite clear (e.g. the failure of an oversteepened slope) while in other cases the relationships may not be so obvious. In most cases more than one factor may contribute towards the initiation of a landslide event. This is clearly seen on the Norwegian continental slope where the location of landslides such as Storegga and Traenadjupet is related to weak geological layers. However the position of these weak layers is determined by regional variation in sedimentation style, which itself is controlled by large scale environmental factors such as climate change between glacial and interglacial conditions. Even when considering all the above listed factors, in the end it was calculated that the landslide needed an earthquake for it to ultimately be initiated.

The environments in which submarine landslides are commonly found in are fjords, active river deltas on the continental margin, submarine canyon fan systems, open continental slopes, and oceanic volcanic islands and ridges.

== Submarine landslide processes ==
There are a variety of different types of submarine mass movements. All of the movements are mutually exclusive, for example a slide cannot be a fall. Some types of mass movements, such as slides, can be distinguished by the disrupted step like morphology which shows that there was only minor movement of the failed mass. The displaced material on a slide moves on a thin region of high strain. In flows the slide zone will be left bare and the displaced mass may be deposited hundreds of kilometres away from the origin of the slide. The displaced sediment of fall will predominantly travel through the water, falling, bouncing and rolling. Despite the variety of different landslides present in submarine environment, only slides, debris flow and turbidity currents provide a substantial contribution to gravity driven sediment transport.

Recent advances in 3-D seismic mapping have revealed spectacular images of submarine landslides off Angola and Brunei, showing in detail the size of blocks transported and how they moved along the sea floor.

It was initially thought that submarine landslides in cohesive sediments systematically and sequentially developed downslope from slide to debris flow to turbidity current through slowly increasing disintegration and entrainment of water. However it is now thought that this model is likely to be an oversimplification, as some landslides travel many hundreds of kilometres without any noticeable change into turbidity currents, as shown in figure 3 while others completely change into turbidity currents near to the source. This variation in the development of different submarine landslides is associated with the development of velocity vectors in the displaced mass. The in-place stress, sediment properties (particularly density), and morphology of the failed mass will determine whether the slide stops a short distance along the rupture surface or will transform into a flow which travels great distances.

The initial density of the sediment plays a key role in the mobilization into flows and the distances that the slide will travel. If the sediment is a soft, fluid material then the slide is likely to travel great distances and a flow is more likely to occur. However, if the sediment is stiffer then the slide will only travel a short distance and a flow is less likely to occur. Furthermore, the ability to flow may also be dependent upon the amount of energy transferred to the falling sediment throughout the failure event. Often large landslides on the continental margin are complicated and components of slide, debris flow and turbidity current may all be apparent when examining the remains of a submarine landslide.

== Hazards ==
The primary hazards associated with submarine landslides are the direct destruction of infrastructure and tsunami.

Landslides can have significant economic impacts on infrastructure such as the rupture of fibre optic submarine communications cables and pipelines and damage to offshore drilling platforms and can continue onwards on slope angles as low as 1°. An example of submarine cable damage was discovered in the Grand Banks slide of 1929 where the landslide and resulting turbidity current broke a series of submarine cables up to nearly 600 km away from the beginning of the slide. Further destruction of infrastructure occurred when Hurricane Camille hit the Mississippi delta in 1969 causing a landslide which damaged several offshore drilling platforms.

Submarine landslides can pose a significant hazard when they cause a tsunami. Although a variety of different types of landslides can cause tsunami, all the resulting tsunami have similar features such as large run-ups close to the tsunami, but quicker attenuation compared to tsunami caused by earthquakes. An example of this was the July 17, 1998, Papua New Guinean landslide tsunami where waves up to 15 m high impacted a 20 km section of the coast killing 2,200 people, yet at greater distances the tsunami was not a major hazard. This is due to the comparatively small source area of most landslide tsunami (relative to the area affected by large earthquakes) which causes the generation of shorter wavelength waves. These waves are greatly affected by coastal amplification (which amplifies the local effect) and radial damping (which reduces the distal effect).

The size of landslide-generated tsunamis depends both on the geological details of the landslide (such as its Froude number) and also on assumptions about the hydrodynamics of the model used to simulate tsunami generation, thus they have a large margin of uncertainty. Generally, landslide-induced tsunamis decay more quickly with distance than earthquake-induced tsunamis, as the former, often having a dipole structure at the source, tend to spread out radially and has a shorter wavelength (the rate at which a wave loses energy is inversely proportional to its wavelength, in other words the longer the wavelength of a wave, the slower it loses energy) while the latter disperses little as it propagates away perpendicularly to the source fault. Testing whether a given tsunami model is correct is complicated by the rarity of giant collapses.

Recent findings show that the nature of a tsunami is dependent upon volume, velocity, initial acceleration, length and thickness of the contributing landslide. Volume and initial acceleration are the key factors which determine whether a landslide will form a tsunami. A sudden deceleration of the landslide may also result in larger waves. The length of the slide influences both the wavelength and the maximum wave height. Travel time or run out distance of slide will also influence the resulting tsunami wavelength. In most cases the submarine landslides are noticeably subcritical, that is the Froude number (the ratio of slide speed to wave propagation) is significantly less than one. This suggests that the tsunami will move away from the wave generating slide preventing the buildup of the wave. Failures in shallow waters tend to produce larger tsunamis because the wave is more critical as the speed of propagation is less here. Furthermore, shallower waters are generally closer to the coast meaning that there is less radial damping by the time the tsunami reaches the shore. Conversely tsunamis triggered by earthquakes are more critical when the seabed displacement occurs in the deep ocean as the first wave (which is less affected by depth) has a shorter wavelength and is enlarged when travelling from deeper to shallower waters.

The effects of a submarine landslide on infrastructure can be costly and landslide generated tsunami can be both destructive and deadly.

== Prehistoric submarine landslides ==
- The Storegga Slide, Norway, ca. 3,500 km^{3} (840 mi^{3}), ca. 8,000 years ago, a catastrophic impact on the contemporary coastal Mesolithic population
- The Agulhas slide, ca. 20,000 km^{3} (4,800 mi^{3}), off South Africa, post-Pliocene in age, the largest so far described
- The Ruatoria Debris Avalanche, off North Island New Zealand, ca. 3,000 km^{3} in volume, 42,000 years ago
- Catastrophic debris avalanches have been common on the submerged flanks of ocean island volcanos such as the Hawaiian Islands and the Cape Verde Islands.

=== Giant slides along the Norwegian margin ===
The Storegga Slide is among the largest recent submarine landslides discovered worldwide. Like many other submarine landslides from the North Atlantic it is dated to a Pleistocene – Holocene age. Such large submarine landslides have been interpreted to have occurred most frequently either during the Northern Hemisphere Glaciation (NHG) or during the deglaciation. During glacial or deglacial times a series of geological processes modified intensely the shallow structure of the submarine continental margin. For instance, changing sea levels during glaciation and accompanying sea level drop produce enhanced erosive processes. Advancing or retreating glaciers eroded the continent and provided vast amounts of sediment to the continental shelf. These processes led to the building of trough mouth fans, similar to river fan deltas. The large sediment accumulation promoted slope failures that are observed in the subsurface structure as stacked debris flows above each other. Sliding happened often along weak layers that have less shear strength due to higher effective internal pore pressures e.g. from gashydrate dissolution, other fluids, or simply weakening is due to contrasting sediment properties within the sediment succession. Earthquakes caused by isostatic rebound due to waning glacials are typically assumed as final land-sliding triggers.

In recent years, a series of giant mass transport deposits (MTDs) that are volumetrically much bigger than the deposits of the Storegga slide have been detected in several locations in the subsurface geological record of the Norwegian continental margin using geophysical methods. These MTDs exceed in size any slope failure of the youngest high-glacial times. Individual deposits reach up to 1 km in thickness and the largest are up to 300 km in length. The internal structure imaged with seismic methods shows sometimes a transparent or a chaotic character indicating disintegration of the slide mass. In other examples, subparallel layering supports a cohesive sliding/slumping on a large scale. Local over-pressures are indicated by diapiric structures indicating gravity driven sub-vertical movement of water-rich sediment masses. Norway and Svalbard basins contain several of these giant MTDs, that span in age from Pliocene age at 2.7–2.3 Ma to ~0.5 Ma. In the Lofoten Basin, there were similar detected giant MTDs, but in this case all slides are younger than ~1 Ma. There is an ongoing debate on the generation of giant slides and their relation to Northern Hemisphere Glaciation.

== See also ==
- Glossary of landforms
- Megatsunami
- Olistostrome
- Physical oceanography
- Plate tectonics
