= Back-arc region =

Area behind a volcanic arc

A back-arc above a subduction zone

The back-arc region is the area behind a volcanic arc. In island volcanic arcs, it consists of back-arc basins of oceanic crust with abyssal depths, which may be separated by remnant arcs, similar to island arcs. In continental arcs, the back-arc region is part of the continental platform, either dry land (subaerial) or forming shallow marine basins.

== Formation ==
Back-arc deformation is a product of subduction at convergent plate tectonic boundaries. It initiates and evolves behind the volcanic arc on the overriding plate of a subduction zone. The stresses responsible for the deformation in this region of a subduction zone result from a combination of processes. The absolute motion of the upper plate as it moves towards or away from the trench strongly contributes to deformation in the back-arc region. Since the downgoing slab is partly anchored in the viscous layers of the mantle, and therefore its lateral movement is significantly slower than the surface plate, then any motion of the overriding plate will cause extensional or compressional stress in the back-arc region depending on the direction of motion. In addition, mantle convection in the upper mantle wedge caused by the downward movement of the subducted slab causes stress in the upper plate and the high heat flow that characterizes back-arcs. The pulling effect of the slab as it goes down into the mantle causes a rollback motion of the trench, which also applies stress on the back-arc region of the upper plate. However, this last process has less of an impact on deformation compared to upper plate motion.

Back-arcs can form on either oceanic crust or continental crust. In the case of oceanic crust, most back-arc regions are subjected to tensional stresses and thus develop a spreading center where new oceanic crust is formed. The composition of this new crust is similar to mid-ocean ridge basalt (MORB), although it contains higher amounts of water.

== Back-arc extension vs. compression ==
The back-arc deformation may be either extensional or compressional. The overriding plate will shorten when its motion is directed towards the trench, resulting in a compression of the back-arc region. This type of deformation is associated with a shallow dipping subducted slab. Inversely, an overriding plate moving away from the trench will result in extension, and a back-arc basin will form. This extensional deformation is associated with a steeply dipping slab.

The extreme cases of these two types of back-arc deformation can be found in Chile and at the Marianas arc. The shallow dipping slab subducting beneath Chile at an angle of about 10–15° causes a compressional stress on the back-arc region behind the Andes. On the other extreme, the slab going down into the mantle at the Marianas subduction zone is so steep it is nearly vertical. This is the perfect example of an oceanic back-arc basin experiencing extensional forces. The Oriente in Ecuador (the eastern part of the country covered by rainforest) is also a good example of an extensional back-arc basin, this time in a continental setting. The continental crust in this area east of the Andes has been stretched out and covered by layers of sediments.

== See also ==
- Back-arc basin
- Forearc basin
- Foreland basin
