= Flores back-arc thrust fault =

System of faults in Indonesia

The Flores back-arc thrust fault is a major system of west–east trending thrust faults that extend eastwards from west of Lombok just south of where Sunda Shelf ends at Bali Sea, towards the islands of Sumbawa, Flores, and Alor, with a total length of at least 800 km., entering the Weber Basin and Aru Basin adjacent Sahul Shelf of the Australian plate. The thrust faults are south-dipping and lie within the back arc region of the Sunda–Banda Arc, which is related to the ongoing subduction of the Australian plate beneath the Sunda and Banda Sea plates. The thrust fault system developed as a result of the onset of continental collision as continental crust of the Australian plate reached the Sunda Trench. The eastern part of the fault system is also known as the Wetar thrust. Above the main thrust fault are a series of imbricate (overlapping) thrust faults. These imbricate thrust faults are shallower in depth than the main Flores thrust. Although the exact thrust faults have not been established, these faults were thought to be responsible for the 2018 Lombok earthquakes.
