= Ewaldus Martinus Sedu =

21st-century Indonesian Catholic bishop

- Bishop of the Maumere
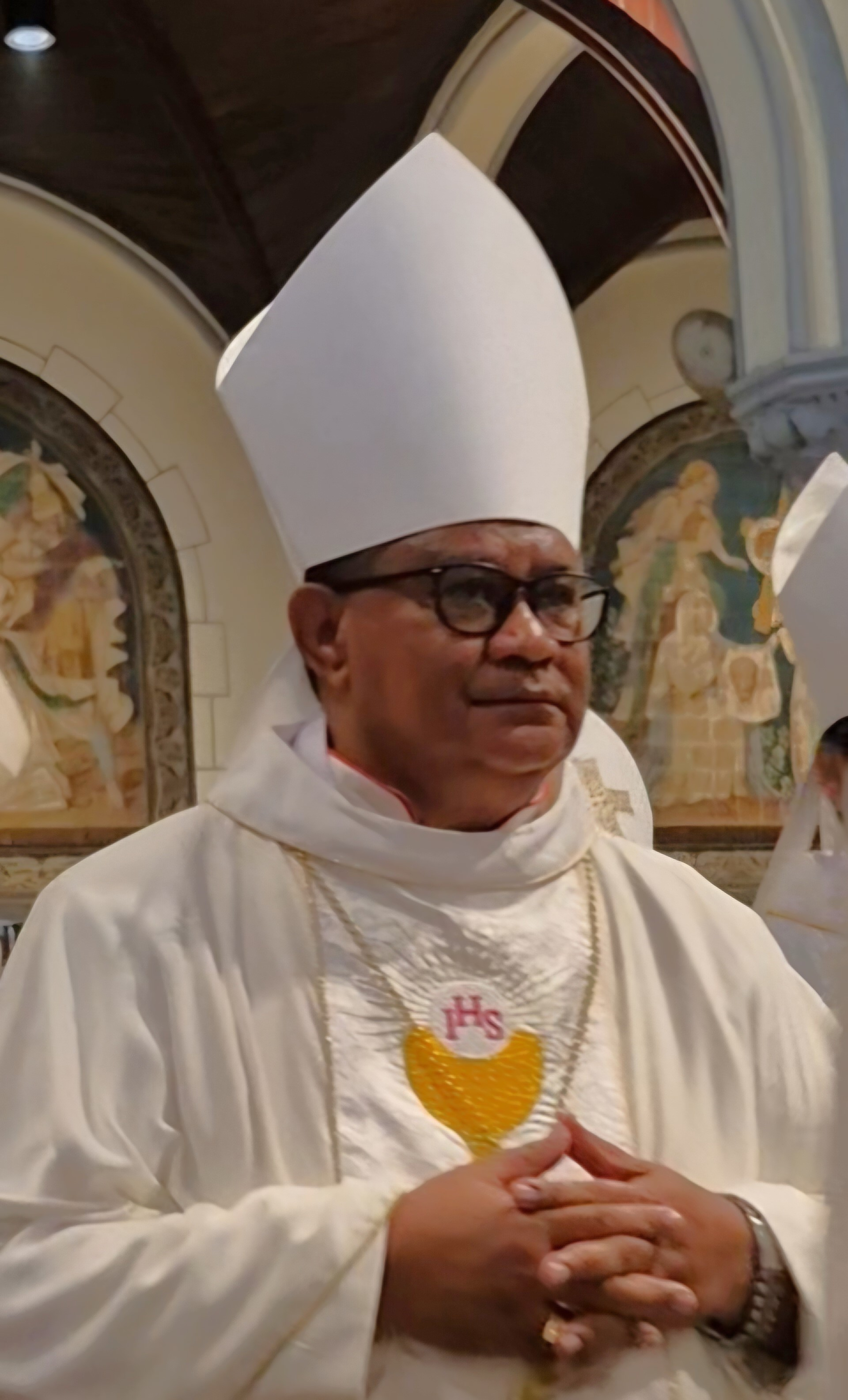
- Sedu in 2018
- Church: Roman Catholic Church
- Diocese: Maumere
- In office: 2018–
- Predecessor: Gerulfus Kherubim Pareira S.V.D.
- Previous post: Priest

Orders
- Ordination: 7 July 1991 by Donatus Djagom, S.V.D.
- Consecration: 26 September 2018 by Gerulfus Kherubim Pareira S.V.D.

Personal details
- Born: 30 July 1963 (age 62) Bajawa, East Nusa Tenggara, Indonesia
- Motto: Duc in altum (put the net out into deep water - Luke 5:4)

Ewaldus Martinus Sedu (born 30 July 1963) is an Indonesian Roman Catholic bishop.

== Biography ==
Sedu was born in Bajawa, to Nikolaus Gapi and Maria Dhone. He attended Mataloko Middle Seminary in the city from 1977 to 1983 for junior and high school. He continued his education in philosophy and theology at the Ledalero Catholic School of Philosophy after undergoing the Year of Spiritual Orientation at the Interdiocesan High Seminary of St. Peter Ritapiret, in Flores where he was elected as class president and general chairman. Sedu returned to the St. John Brekmans Toda Belu Intermediary Seminary from in 1988–89. He was ordained a deacon on 21 October 1989, and was ordained a priest in the Archdiocese of Ende on 7 July 1991. With the formation of the Diocese of Maumere in 2004, Sedu was incardinated as a priest of that diocese on 14 December 2005.

On 14 July 2018 it was announced that Sedu would be the next bishop of the diocese of Maumere, succeeding the retiring Gerulfus Kherubim Pareira. On 26 September 2018 Sedu was consecrated by Pareira as the new bishop of Maumere in the Samador da Cunha Sport Center with more than 20,000 in attendance. The co-consecrators were Vincentius Sensi Potokota, archbishop of Ende, and Franciscus Kopong Kung, bishop of Larantuka.

Before becoming bishop Sedu had served as vicar general of the diocese.
