= List of Catholic dioceses in Indonesia =

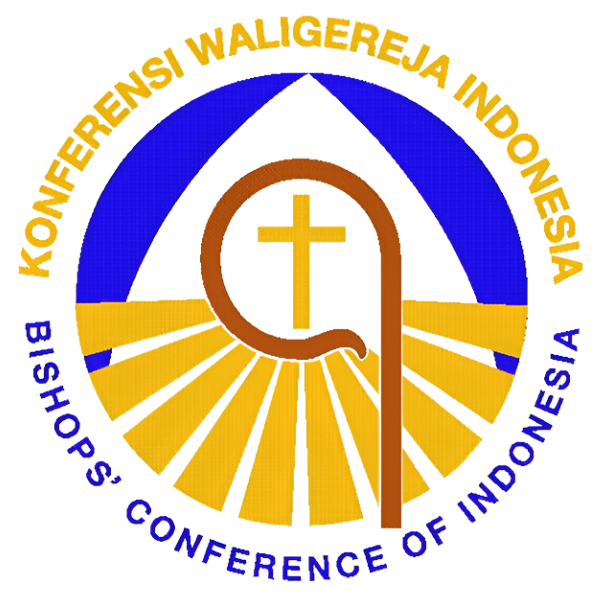
Logo of the Bishops' Conference of Indonesia

Catholic dioceses in Indonesia are grouped into 10 ecclesiastical provinces, consisting of 10 archdioceses and 28 suffragan dioceses and 1 military ordinariate. The bishops who lead each ecclesiastical region are members of the Bishops' Conference of Indonesia (BCI).

== Region of Nusa Tenggara ==
| Map | Diocese | Coat of Arms |
=== Ecclesiastical Province of Ende ===
| | Archdiocese of Ende | |
| | Diocese of Denpasar | |
| | Diocese of Labuan Bajo | |
| | Diocese of Larantuka | |
| | Diocese of Maumere | |
| | Diocese of Ruteng | |
=== Ecclesiastical Province of Kupang ===
| | Archdiocese of Kupang | |
| | Diocese of Atambua | |
| | Diocese of Weetebula | |

== List of dioceses in Indonesia ==
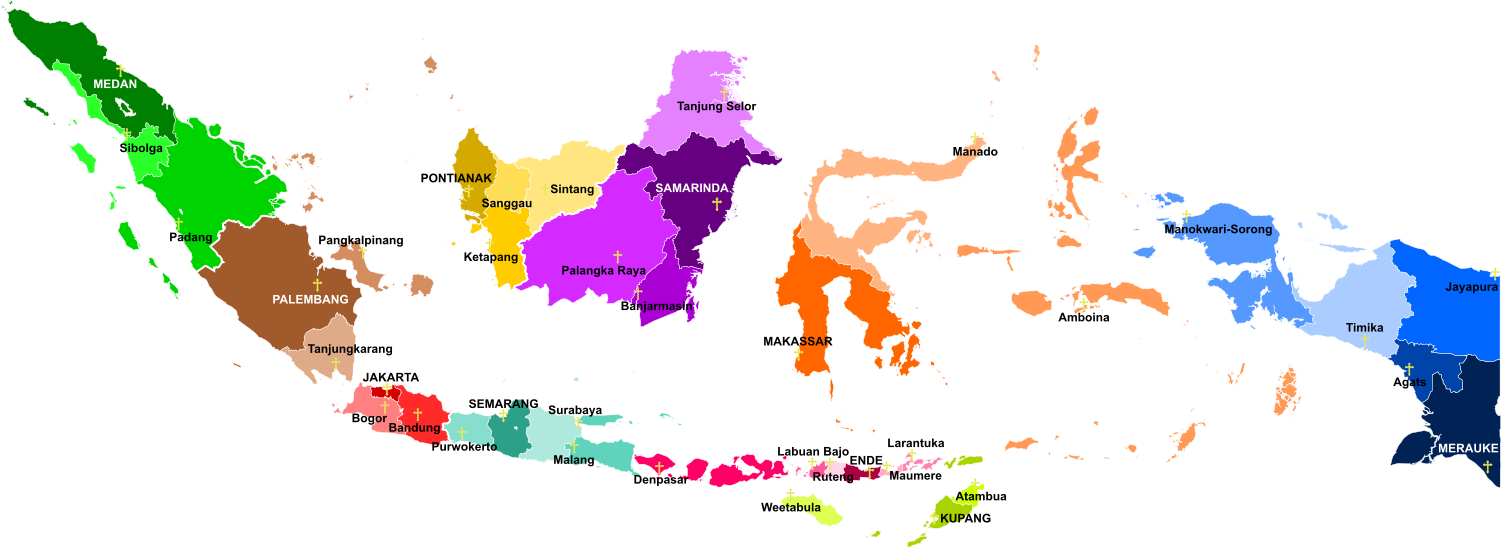

=== The Bishops' Conference of Indonesia ===
==== Ecclesiastical Province of Ende ====

- Archdiocese of Ende
  - Diocese of Denpasar
  - Diocese of Labuan Bajo
  - Diocese of Larantuka
  - Diocese of Maumere
  - Diocese of Ruteng

==== Ecclesiastical Province of Jakarta ====

- Archdiocese of Jakarta
  - Diocese of Bandung
  - Diocese of Bogor

==== Ecclesiastical Province of Kupang ====

- Archdiocese of Kupang
  - Diocese of Atambua
  - Diocese of Weetebula

==== Ecclesiastical Province of Makassar ====

- Archdiocese of Makassar
  - Diocese of Amboina
  - Diocese of Manado

==== Ecclesiastical Province of Medan ====

- Archdiocese of Medan
  - Diocese of Padang
  - Diocese of Sibolga

==== Ecclesiastical Province of Merauke ====

- Archdiocese of Merauke
  - Diocese of Agats
  - Diocese of Jayapura
  - Diocese of Manokwari-Sorong
  - Diocese of Timika

==== Ecclesiastical Province of Palembang ====

- Archdiocese of Palembang
  - Diocese of Pangkal-Pinang
  - Diocese of Tanjungkarang

==== Ecclesiastical Province of Pontianak ====

- Archdiocese of Pontianak
  - Diocese of Ketapang
  - Diocese of Sanggau
  - Diocese of Sintang

==== Ecclesiastical Province of Samarinda ====

- Archdiocese of Samarinda
  - Diocese of Banjarmasin
  - Diocese of Palangkaraya
  - Diocese of Tanjung Selor

==== Ecclesiastical Province of Semarang ====

- Archdiocese of Semarang
  - Diocese of Malang
  - Diocese of Purwokerto
  - Diocese of Surabaya

==== Military Ordinariate ====
- Military Ordinariate of Indonesia

== See also ==
- Religion in Indonesia
