= Gerulfus Kherubim Pareira =

Indonesian Roman Catholic bishop (1941–2024)

Gerulfus Kherubim Pareira SVD
- Bishop Emeritus of Maumere
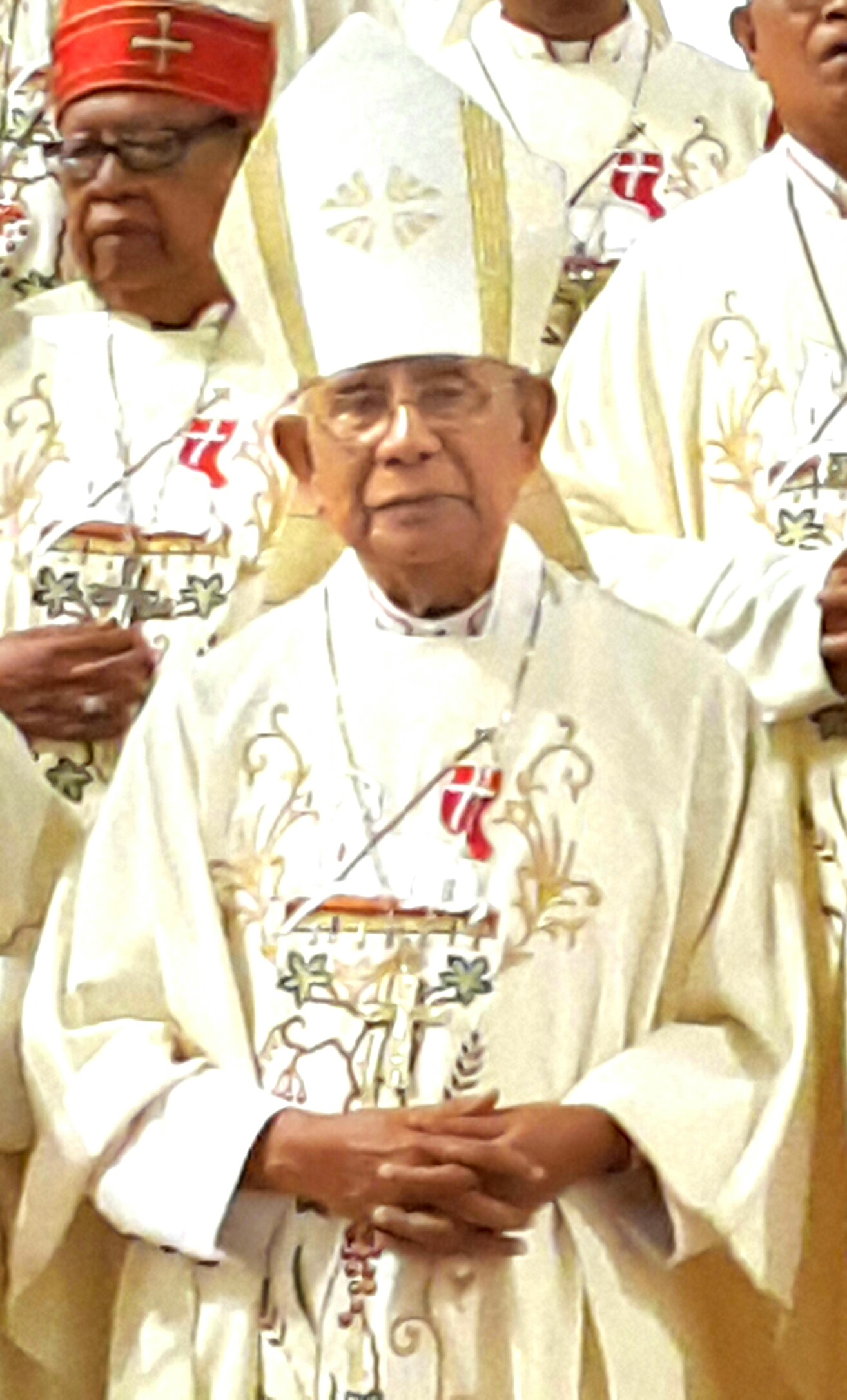
- Pareira in 2017
- Church: Roman Catholic Church
- Archdiocese: Ende
- Diocese: Maumere
- Appointed: 19 January 2008
- Term ended: 14 July 2018
- Predecessor: Vincentius Sensi Potokota
- Successor: Ewaldus Martinus Sedu
- Previous post: Bishop of Weetebula (1985–2008)

Orders
- Ordination: 22 August 1970
- Consecration: 25 April 1986 by Gregorius Manteiro
- Rank: Bishop

Personal details
- Born: 26 September 1941 Lela, Sikka Regency, Timor and Dependencies Residency, Dutch East Indies
- Died: 8 October 2024 (aged 83) Maumere, Indonesia
- Motto: Ut Omnes Unum Sint (So that All People Unite – John 17:21)

Gerulfus Kherubim Pareira SVD (26 September 1941 – 8 October 2024) was an Indonesian Roman Catholic bishop.

== Biography ==
On 15 August 1970, Pareira was accepted as a member of the society of the divine word. The following week on 22 August 1970, he was ordained a priest. On 21 December 1985, it was announced that Pareira had been chosen as the new bishop of the Diocese of Weetebula. He was ordained bishop on 25 April 1986 by Gregorius Manteiro, then bishop of Rueteng, and co-consecrated by Anton Pain Ratu, then bishop of Atambua, and Eduardus Sangsun, then bishop of Ruteng. On 19 January 2008, Pareira was installed as the new bishop of the Diocese of Maumere.

In 2011, Pareira celebrated his 50 monastic life, 40 years as a priest and 25 years as a bishop.

On 26 September 2016, the Vatican accepted Pareira's letter of resignation, which he had submitted as all bishops are required to do once they turn 75. On 14 July 2018, Pareira officially retired as the bishop of Maumere at the age of 76.

Pareira died in Maumere on 8 October 2024, at the age of 83.

Catholic Church titles
Preceded by Vincentius Sensi Potokota	Bishop of Maumere; 2008–2018	Succeeded by Ewaldus Martinus Sedu
Preceded by Gerhard J. Legeland	Bishop of Weetebula; 1985–2008	Succeeded by Edmund Woga
