= Dominikus Saku =

21st-century Indonesian Catholic bishop

- Bishop of Atambua
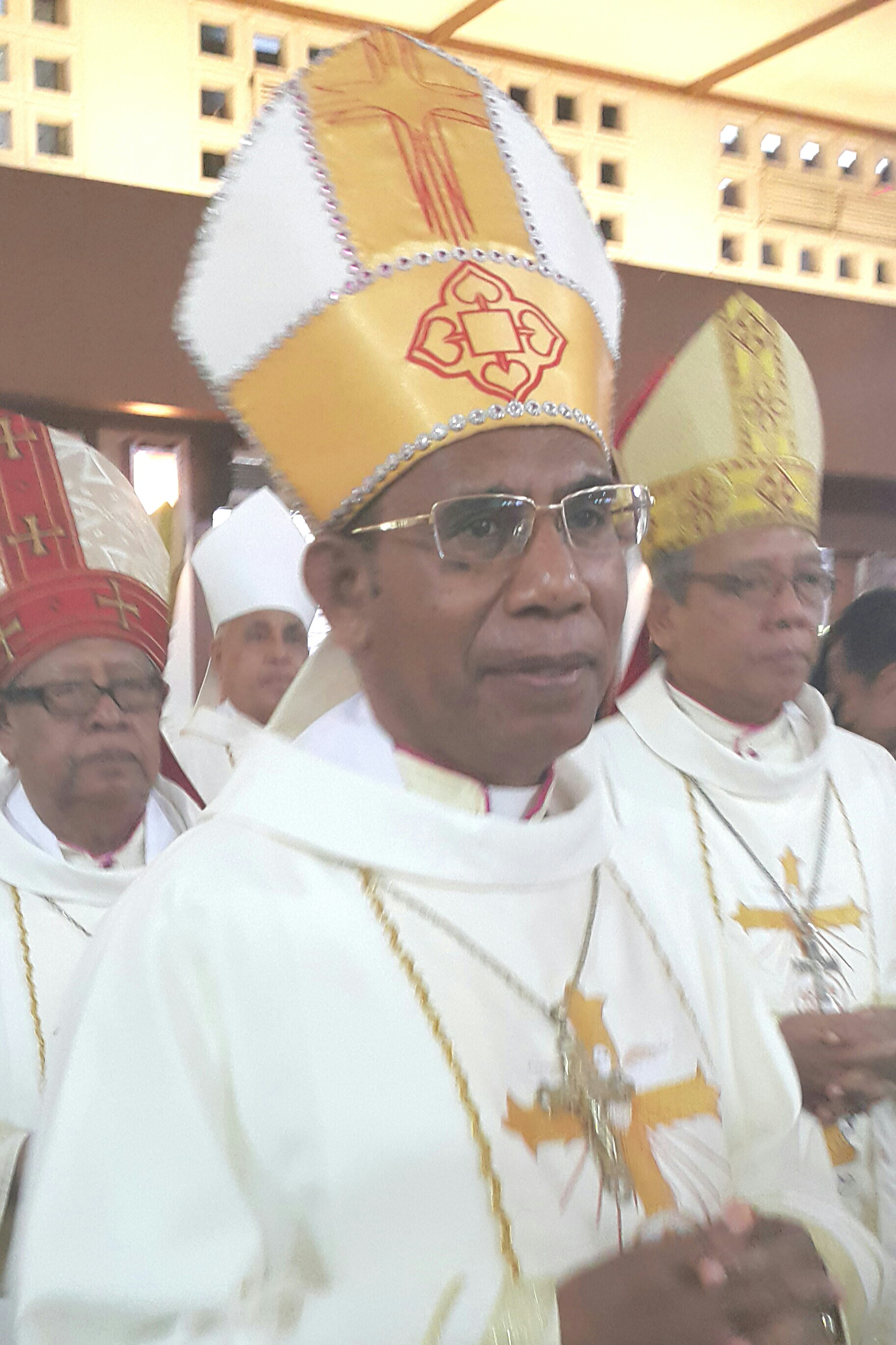
- Saku in 2017
- Church: Roman Catholic Church
- Diocese: Atambua
- In office: 2007–
- Predecessor: Anton Pain Ratu S.V.D.
- Previous post: Priest

Orders
- Ordination: 29 September 1992
- Consecration: 21 September 2007 by Anton Pain Ratu S.V.D.
- Rank: bishop

Personal details
- Born: 3 April 1960 (age 66) Taekas, North Central Timor, East Nusa Tenggara, Indonesia
- Motto: Vos Amici Mei Estis (You are my friends)

Dominikus Saku (born 3 April 1960) is an Indonesian Roman Catholic bishop.

== Biography ==
Saku was born in Taekas, North Central Timor Regency on the island of Timor. He attended the local diocesan minor seminary and then studied philosophy and theology at St Peter's Seminary, at Maumere. He was ordained a priest of the diocese of Atambua on 29 September 1992.

Afterbeing ordained Saku studied at Pontifical Urban University in Rome from 1995 to 1999. Before becoming bishop Saku, besides being a priest, was a professor and formator at the major seminary in Kupang from 2003 to 2007 and was a professor of theology at Widya Mandira Catholic University.

On 2 June 2007 Saku was appointed bishop of the diocese of Atambua to replace the retiring bishop Anton Pain Ratu S.V.D. On 21 September 2007 Saku was ordained bishop by Ratu, with Peter Turang, then archbishop of Kupang, and Gerulfus Kherubim Pareira S.V.D., then bishop of Weetebula, were the co-consecrators.

In 2018 Saku held a conference where he discussed the issue of providing for migrants into Indonesia from neighboring Timor Leste. He emphasized that migrants need to be treated with dignity and respect in Indonesia.
