= Paul Boedhie Kleden =

Indonesian Catholic Archbishop and Prelate

His Excellency, The Most Reverend, Monsignor Dr. Paul Boedhie Kleden SVD
- Metropolitan Archbishop of Ende
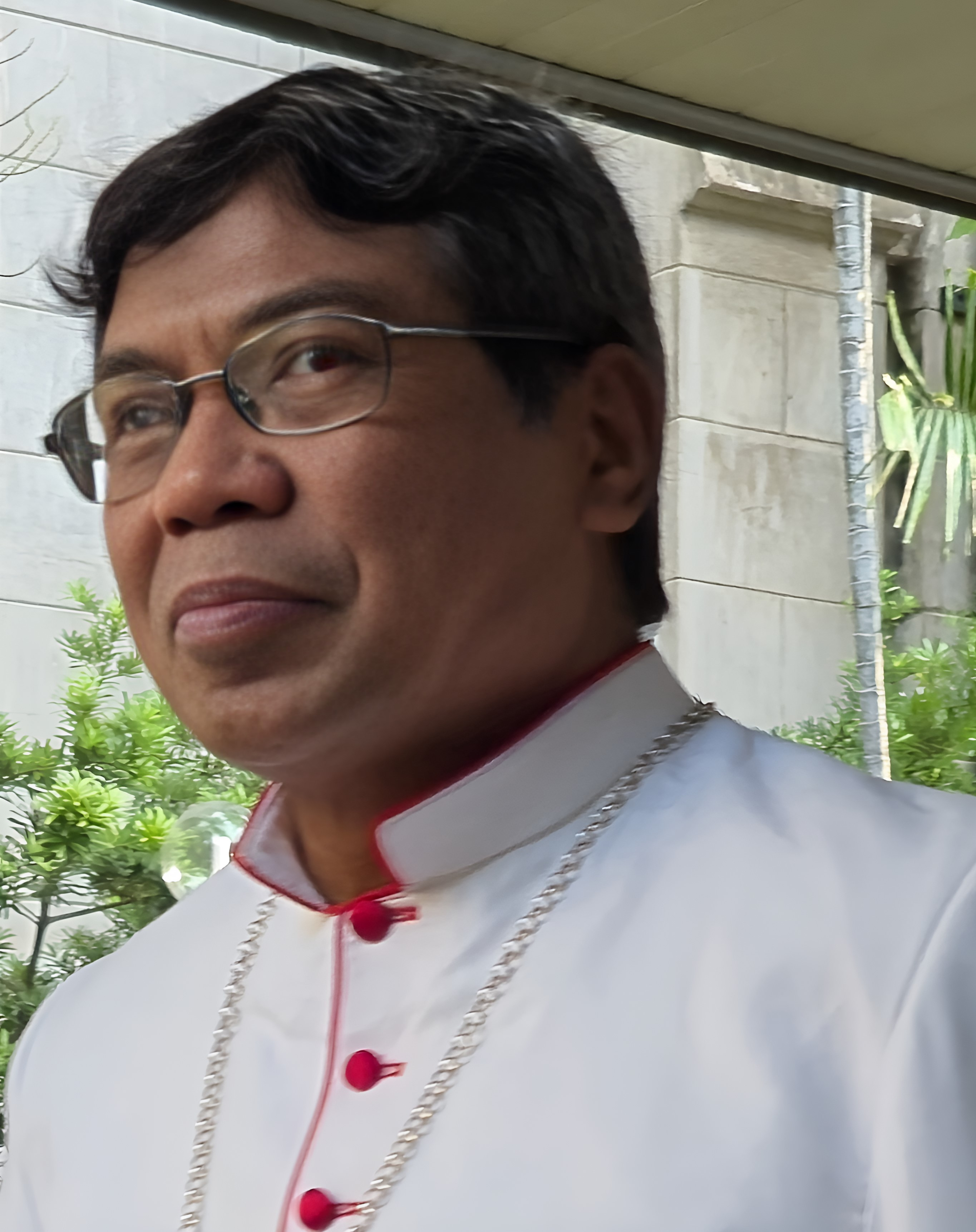
- Church: Catholic Church
- Archdiocese: Ende
- Appointed: 16 May 2024
- Installed: 22 August 2024
- Predecessor: Vincentius Sensi Potokota

Orders
- Ordination: 19 May 1993 by Hans Hermann Groër, OSB
- Consecration: 22 August 2024 by Piero Pioppo, Ewaldus Martinus Sedu, and Siprianus Hormat

Personal details
- Born: Paul Boedhie Kleden; November 16, 1965 (age 61) Ende, East Nusa Tenggara, Indonesia.
- Denomination: Catholic Church
- Parents: Peter Sina Kleden; Dorothea Sea Halan
- Occupation: Archbishop, Prelate
- Education: University of Freiburg
- Motto: "Caritas Fraternitatis Maneat in Vobis Custodi" (Keep the brotherly love that abide in you) (Hebrews 13:1)

Styles of Paul Boedhie Kleden, S.V.D.
- Reference style: His Excellency; The Most Reverend
- Spoken style: Your Excellency
- Religious style: Monsignor

Paul Boedhie Kleden, SVD (born 16 November 1965) is an Indonesian prelate of the Catholic Church who has been serving as the archbishop of Ende since 2024. He is a member of the Society of the Divine Word and was its superior general from 2018 until his appointment as Archbishop.

== Biography ==
Mons. Paul Boedhie Kleden was born on 16 November 1965 in Flores in East Nusa Tenggara, Indonesia, where he was raised and received his early education. After his graduation from the minor seminary of Santo Domingo in Hokeng, he joined the Verbite novitiate in Ledalero, Flores. He also studied philosophy at the San Paulus Major Seminary and theology at the Philosophisch-Theologische Hochschule St. Gabriel in Mödling, Austria. He gave his solemn perpetual oath as a Verbite member on 1992 and was ordained a priest on 19 May 1993. He then served as a parish vicar in Basel, Switzerland (1993–1996). He received a doctoral degree in dogmatic theology from the University of Freiburg in 2000. He then returned to Indonesia, where he served as lecturer in theology at the major seminary of Ledalero, Maumere (2001–2012). He was named member of the Provincial Council (2005–2008) member of the General Council of the S.V.D. (2012–2018) and superior general of Society of the Divine Word (2018-2024).

On 25 May 2024, Pope Francis appointed Kleden as Metropolitan Archbishop of the Archdiocese of Ende.

His solemn episcopal consecration and installation as metropolitan archbishop will be on 22 August 2024.

Catholic Church titles
Preceded by Vincentius Sensi Potokota	Metropolitan Archbishop of Ende; 2024–Present	Succeeded by Incumbent
