= Maunura =

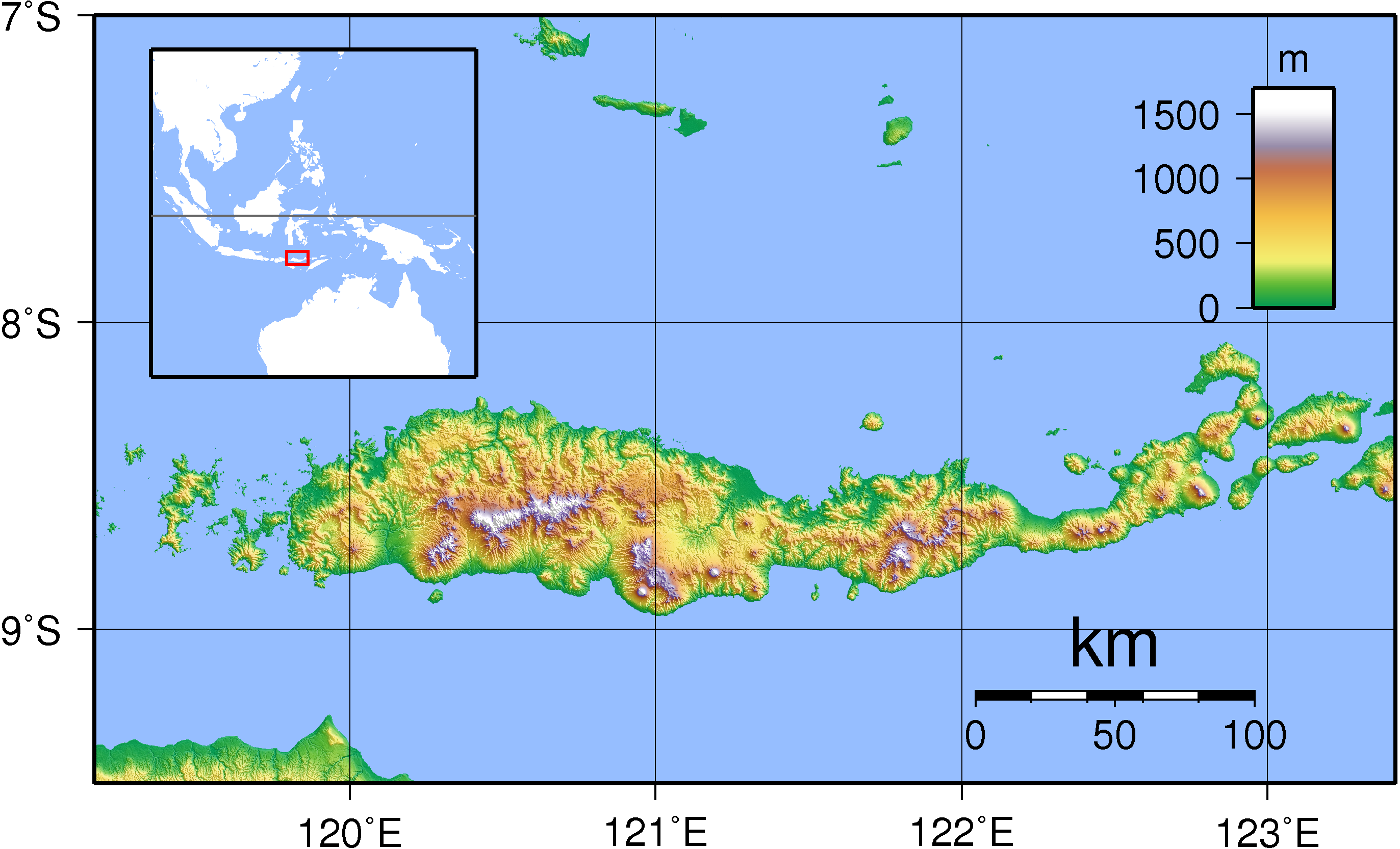
- Flores Island and its location in Indonesia

- Location within Indonesia
- Country: Indonesia
- Region: Lesser Sunda Islands
- Province: East Nusa Tenggara

Population
  - Total: 5,000

Maunura is a village in Indonesia located 45 km west of Ende, Flores. The population of Maunura is around 5,000 residents.
