= Maximilianus Rex =

Indonesian Catholic bishop (born 1973)

His Excellency, the Most Reverend Monsignor Maximilianus Rex
- Bishop of Labuan Bajo
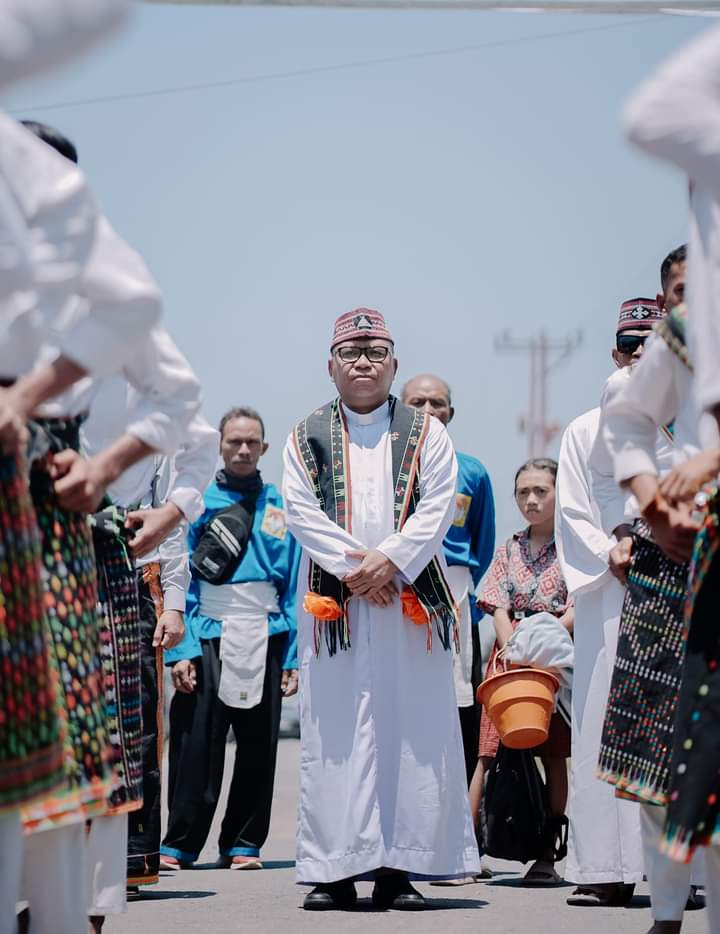
- Church: Catholic Church
- Archdiocese: Ende
- Diocese: Labuan Bajo
- See: Labuan Bajo (Portus Bajavensis)
- Appointed: 21 June 2024
- Installed: 1 November 2024

Orders
- Ordination: 10 August 2001 by Mons. Edward Sangsun, S.V.D.
- Consecration: 1 November 2024 by Ignatius Cardinal Suharyo

Personal details
- Born: Maximilianus Rex; September 23, 1973 (age 53) Manggarai, East Nusa Tenggara, Indonesia.
- Denomination: Catholic Church
- Occupation: Bishop, Prelate
- Education: Saint Petrus-Ritapiret Pontifical Major Seminary; University of Indonesia; Erasmus University Rotterdam; Tilburg University
- Motto: UT MUNDUS SALVETUR PER IPSUM; That the world through Him might be saved (John 3:17)
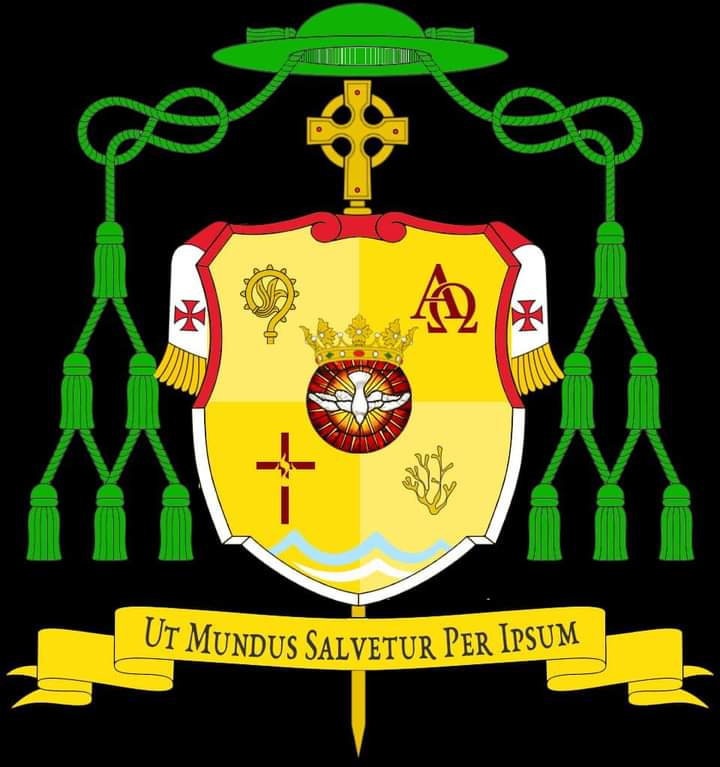
- Coat of arms

Styles of Maximilianus Rex
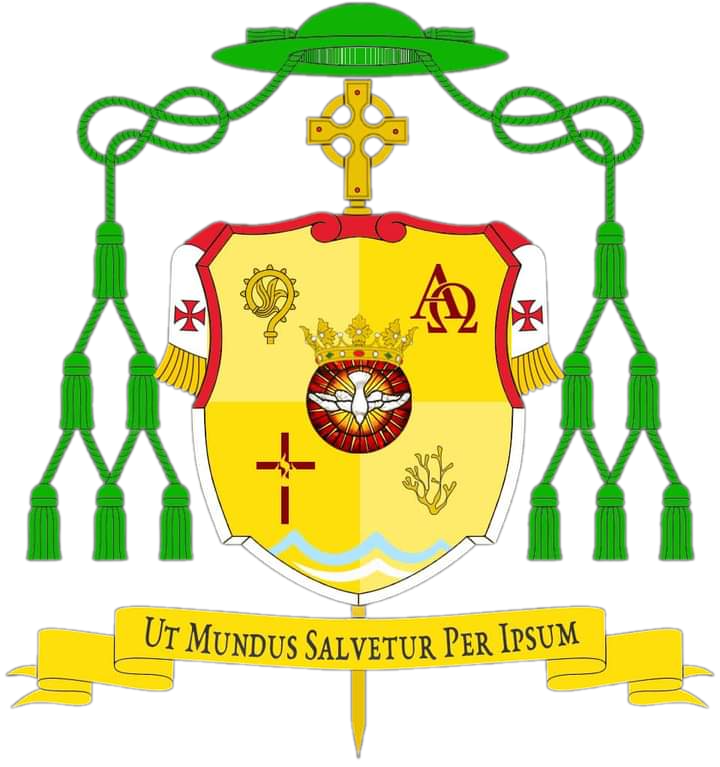
- Reference style: His Excellency; The Most Reverend
- Spoken style: Your Excellency
- Religious style: Monsignor

Maximilianus Rex (born 23 September 1973) is an Indonesian Catholic prelate. On 21 June 2024, he has been appointed as the first bishop of the Diocese of Labuan Bajo diocese since its erection from the Diocese of Ruteng in Manggarai Regency, East Nusa Tenggara. From 2023 to 2024 he was rector of The Catholic University of St. Paul in Ruteng.

== Biography ==
Mons. Max was born in Manggarai, East Nusa Tenggara, Indonesia, on 23 September 1973.

He attended the Pius XII Pontifical Roman Minor Seminary and carried out his studies in philosophy and theology at the Saint Petrus-Ritapiret Pontifical Major Seminary in the diocese of Maumere on 1992. He was ordained a priest on 10 August 2001 in Manggarai by Mons. Edward Sangsun, S.V.D. and incardinated there. He assigned as the associate pastor to the Christ the King parish church (2001–2007), chairman of the diocesan Commission for youth pastoral care, and member of the diocesan Commission for interreligious dialogue (2002–2007). In 2007, He went on to study at the Faculty of Socio-Political Sciences of the University of Indonesia. at the Erasmus University Rotterdam, and Tilburg University (2011–2017), where he was awarded a doctoral degree on social sciences there. Since 2018, he was a lecturer at the Catholic University of Saint Paul in Ruteng, and dean of the Faculty of Educational and Formative Sciences (2019–2023), and since 2020, coordinator of diocesan priests of Ruteng.

On 21 June 2024, The Roman Catholic Diocese of Labuan Bajo in West Manggarai Regency has been erected from The Roman Catholic Diocese of Ruteng in Manggarai Regency, and he has been appointed as its first bishop. On 1 November 2024, he will receive his episcopal ordination.
