= Woga =

Woga may refer to:

- Edmund Woga (born 1950), Indonesian Roman Catholic bishop
- Woga or Lamang language
- WOGA (FM)
- Woga (album) by Charles Kynard
- World Olympic Gymnastics Academy
