= Diocese of Weetebula =

Roman Catholic diocese on Sumba, Indonesia

Coordinates: 9°26′00″S 119°13′51″E

Diocese of Weetebula Dioecesis Veetebulaensis Keuskupan Weetebula
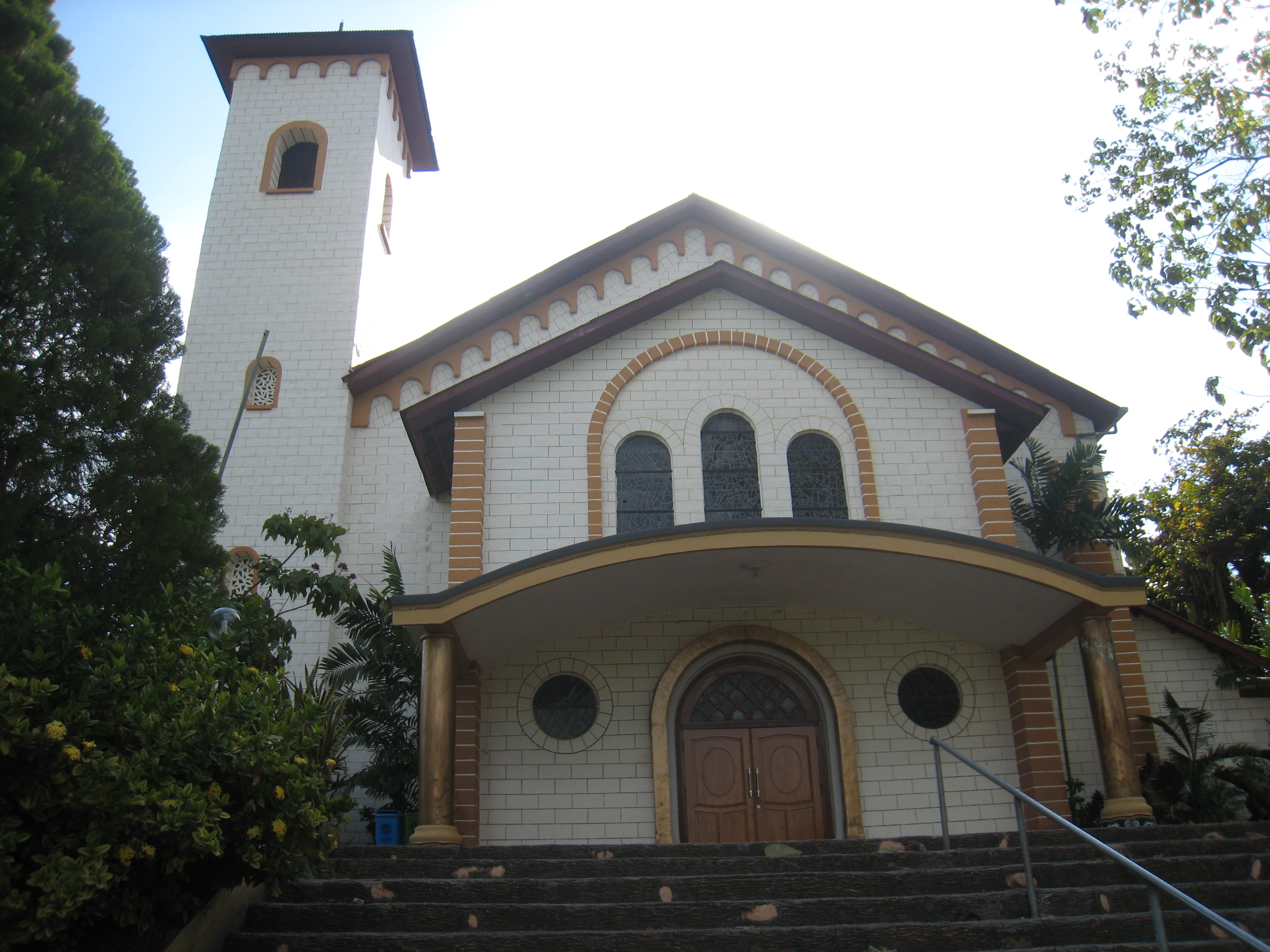
- Cathedral in Weetebula

Location
- Country: Indonesia
- Ecclesiastical province: Kupang
- Metropolitan: Kupang

Statistics
- Area: 11,641 km^{2} (4,495 sq mi)
- Population: Total; Catholics: (as of 2024); 948,215; 213,000 (22.5%)

Information
- Rite: Latin Rite
- Cathedral: Cathedral of the Holy Spirit in East Nusa Tenggara

Current leadership
- Pope: Leo XIV
- Bishop: Edmund Woga
- Metropolitan Archbishop: Hironimus Pakaenoni

The Roman Catholic Diocese of Weetebula (Latin: Veetebulaen(sis)) is a suffragan Latin diocese in the ecclesiastical province of the Metropolitan of Kupang in Indonesia. It pastorally serves all of Sumba Island.

Its cathedral episcopal see is Katedral Roh Kudus, located in the town of Waitabula, in the northwest of Sumba Island, Nusa Tenggara Timur.

== History ==
- Established on October 20, 1959 as the Apostolic Prefecture of Weetebula, on territory split off from the then Apostolic Vicariate of Endeh (now a Metropolitan Archdiocese)
- Promoted on February 6, 1969 as Diocese of Weetebula.

== Ordinaries ==
(all Roman Rite, so far missionary members of Latin congregations)

Apostolic Prefects of Weetebula

- Fr. Gerard J. Legeland, Holy Ghost Fathers (C.SS.R.) (March 15, 1960 – death 1969)
- Apostolic Administrator (1969 – 1975) Fr. Wilhelm Wagener, C.SS.R.
- Apostolic Administrator (1975 – 1980) Fr. Henricus Haripranata, Society of Jesus (S.J.)

Suffragan Bishops of Weetebula

- Gerulfus Kherubim Pareira, Divine Word Missionaries (S.V.D.) (December 21, 1985 – January 19, 2008), later Bishop of Maumere (Indonesia) (2008.01.19 – ...)
- Edmund Woga, C.SS.R. (July 16, 2009 - ...)

== Sources and external links ==
- GCatholic.org
- Catholic Hierarchy
