= Christ the King Cathedral, Ende =

Christ the King Cathedral
- Indonesian: Gereja Katedral Kristus Raja
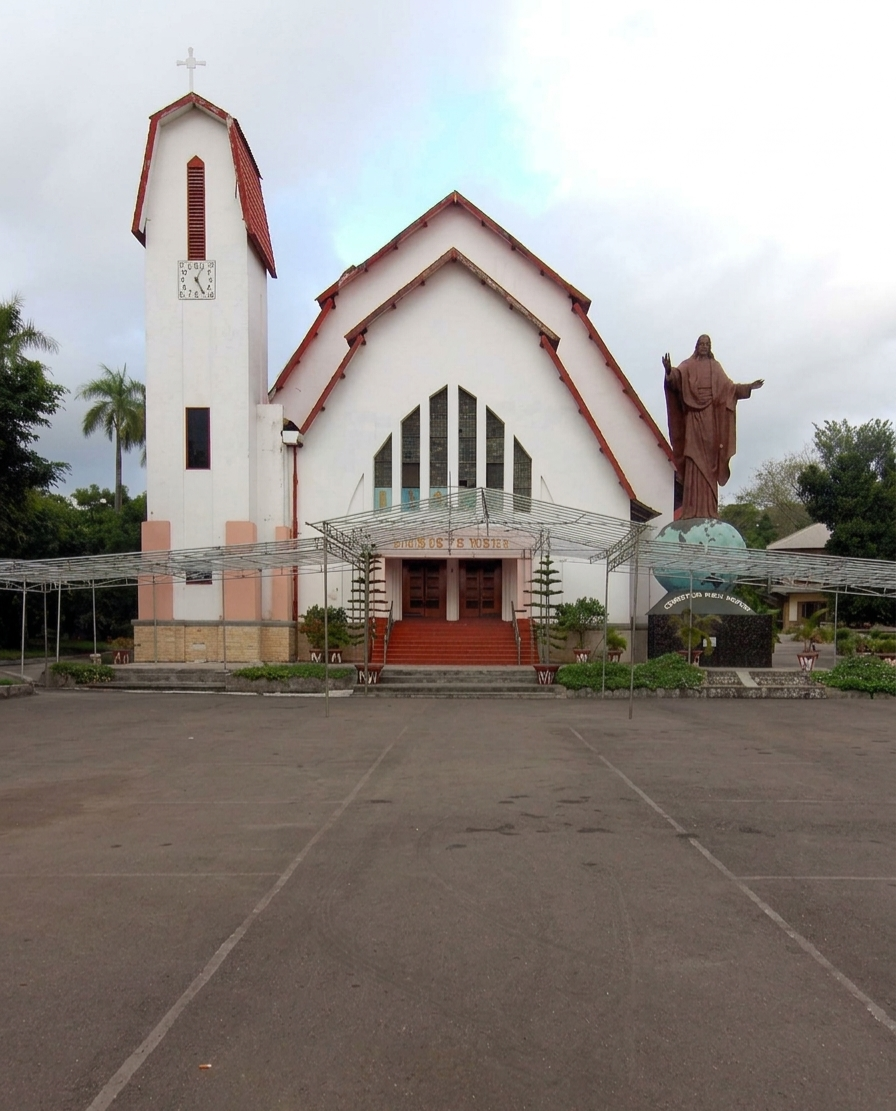
- Christ the King Cathedral
- Location: Ende
- Country: Indonesia
- Denomination: Roman Catholic Church

The Christ the King Cathedral (Indonesian: Gereja Katedral Kristus Raja), also called Ende Cathedral, Roman Catholic religious building in the city of Ende, Indonesia.

The temple follows the Roman or Latin rite and is the mother church of the Metropolitan Archdiocese of Ende, which began as an apostolic prefecture in 1913 and was elevated to its current status in 1961 by the bull "Quod Christus" Of Pope John XXIII.

It is under the pastoral responsibility of Archbishop Vincentius Sensi Potokota.

== See also ==
- Roman Catholicism in Indonesia
- Christ the King
