= Gabriel Manek =

Indonesian Cleric

Servant of God Gabriel Wilhemus Manek SVD
- Archbishop of Ende
- Church: Catholic Church
- Archdiocese: Archdiocese of Endeh
- In office: 3 January 1961 – 19 December 1968
- Predecessor: Antoine Hubert Thijssen
- Successor: Donatus Djagom
- Other post: Titular Archbishop of Bavagaliana (1968-1976)
- Previous posts: Titular Bishop of Alinda (1951-1961); Vicar Apostolic of Larantuka (1951-1961)

Orders
- Ordination: 28 January 1941
- Consecration: 25 April 1951 by Heinrich Leven

Personal details
- Born: Lay Tjong Sie; 18 August 1913 Lahurus (near Atambua), Timor and Dependencies Residency, Dutch East Indies, Dutch Empire
- Died: 30 November 1989 (aged 76) Denver, Colorado, United States

Gabriel Wilhemus Manek, SVD (born Lay Tjong Sie; 18 August 1913 – 30 November 1989) was an Indonesian Catholic prelate who served as Archbishop of Ende from 1961 to 1968. He was a member of the Divine Word Missionaries.

== Biography ==
Gabriel Wilhemus Manek became the first Bishop of the Diocese of Larantuka, Flores. He was born on August 18, 1913, in the village of Lahurus, Timor, to Yohannes Leki and Sioe Ken Moy. His mother died when Manck was still young. He was then adopted by his mother's sister, Maria Belak, wife of King Don Kaitanus da Costa, King of the North Tasifero Kingdom, North Belu. In 1920, he entered elementary school at Halilulik Standard School in Ndona, then entered the Minor Seminary in Sikka in 1927. On October 16, 1932, he entered the SVD Novitiate and from January 17, 1937, studied at the Ledalero Major Seminary, graduating first in class. On January 23, 1943, he was ordained a priest by Bishop Heinrich Leven, and was assigned first as a pastor in the Nita area, then in Lahurus, his hometown. He was selected as one of three Timorese delegates to the Denpasar Conference and served as the spokesperson for the Timorese delegation. He also attended the Parliamentary Session of the State of East Indonesia (NIT). On March 8, 1951, Pope Pius XII appointed him apostolic vicar of the Diocese of Larantuka. A month later, on April 25, 1951, he was consecrated bishop at the age of 38, becoming the second native bishop, after Bishop Albertus Soegijapranata SJ, in Semarang. In 1956, he traveled to Rome, the Netherlands, Germany, and Switzerland. In 1961, Pope John XXIII appointed Gabriel Manek as Archbishop of the Archdiocese of Ende. In 1968, he became ill, retired from his see and went to San Francisco for treatment, while also serving the congregation of the St. Francis Xavier community and the African-American community in Oakland. He died on November 30, 1989, in Denver, Colorado and was buried in Techny, Illinois, in December. In 2007, his body was returned to Larantuka. He is known as the cofounder of the Religious Order of the Daughters of Our Lady, Queen of the Holy Rosary (PRR).

== Sources ==
- Sisters PRR
- Sejarah Pendiri PRR (indonesian)
- Gabriel Manek SVD (indonesian)
