= Diocese of Labuan Bajo =

Roman Catholic diocese in Indonesia

Diocese of Labuan Bajo Dioecesis Labuanbaiensis Keuskupan Labuan Bajo

Location
- Country: Indonesia
- Territory: West Manggarai Regency, East Nusa Tenggara, Indonesia
- Metropolitan: Ende

Statistics
- Area: 3.141 km^{2} (1.213 sq mi)
- Population: Total; Catholics: (as of 2023); 275.903; 220.487 (79,3%)
- Parishes: 25

Information
- Denomination: Catholic
- Sui iuris church: Latin Church
- Rite: Roman Rite
- Established: 21 June 2024
- Cathedral: Holy Spirit Cathedral in Labuan Bajo
- Secular priests: 90

Current leadership
- Pope: Leo XIV
- Bishop: Maximilianus Rex
- Metropolitan Archbishop: Paul Boedhie Kleden

Map

The Roman Catholic Diocese of Labuan Bajo (Latin: Dioecesis Labuanbaiensis) is a diocese of the Latin Church of the Catholic Church, located in the Lesser Sunda Islands, Indonesia. The diocese was split from Roman Catholic Diocese of Ruteng and was established on 21 June 2024. Its cathedral episcopal see is the Cathedral of The Holy Spirit in Labuan Bajo.

== History ==
The diocese was established on 21 June 2024, on territory split from Roman Catholic Diocese of Ruteng. Its erection was the result of the 3rd diocesan synod in Ruteng in 2021. All preparation was about to do. On 21 June 2024 The Holy See announced its erection and appointed Fr. Maximilianus Rex as its first bishop.

== Episcopal Ordinaries ==
Suffragan Bishops

- Maximilianus Rex (2024-...)
