= Edmund Woga =

21st-century Indonesian Catholic bishop

Edmund Woga CSsR
- Bishop of the Diocese of Weetebula
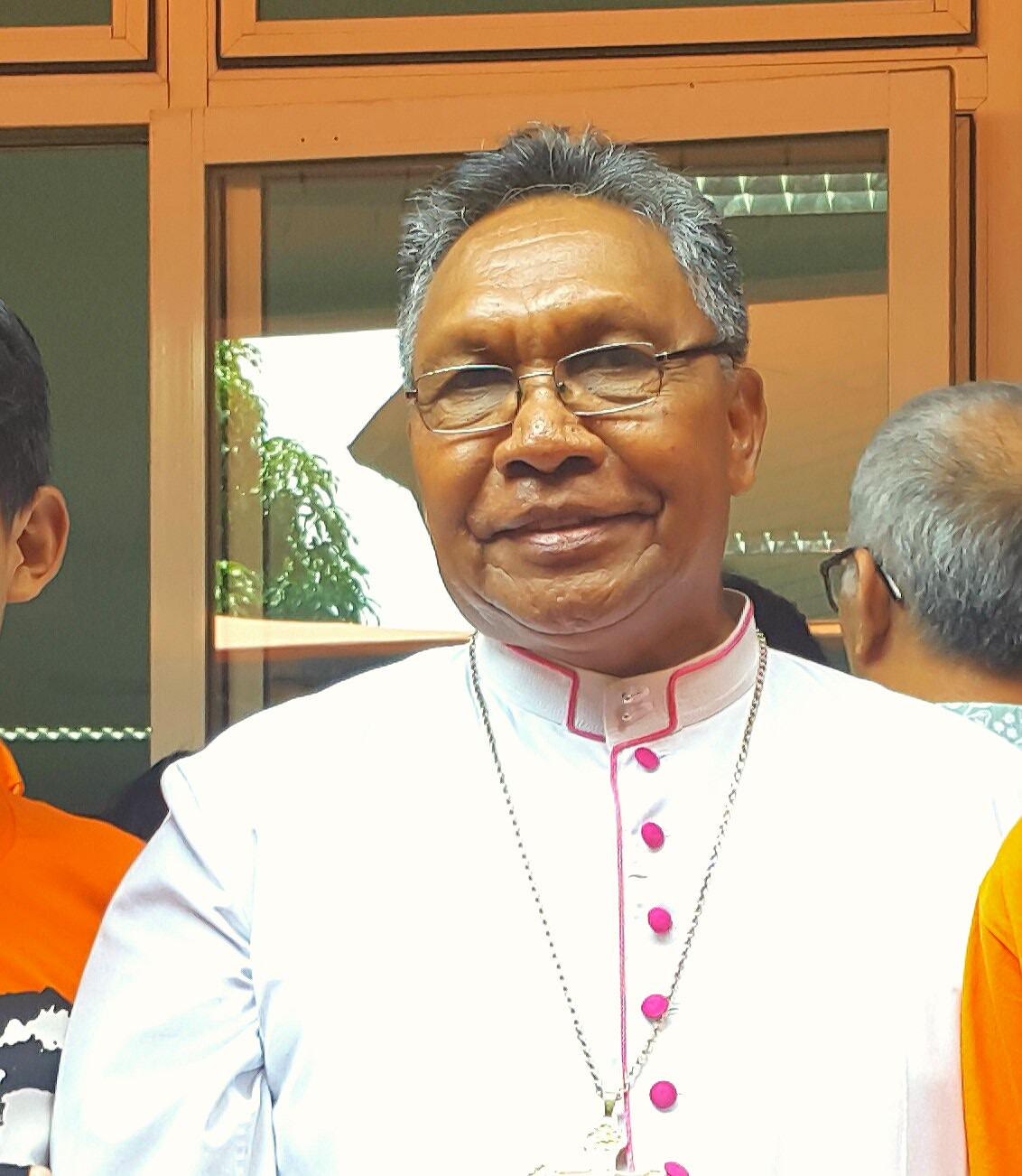
- Pareira in 2017
- Church: Roman Catholic Church
- Diocese: Diocese of Weetebula
- In office: 2009–
- Predecessor: Gerulfus Kherubim Pareira
- Previous post: Redemptorist priests

Orders
- Ordination: 22 August 1970
- Consecration: 25 April 1986 by Gerulfus Kherubim Pareira
- Rank: Bishop

Personal details
- Born: 17 November 1950 (age 76) Hewokloang, Sikka Regency, East Nusa Tenggara, Indonesia
- Motto: Praedicare Redemptionem (Proclaiming the Redemption)

Edmund Woga CSsR (born 26 September 1950) is an Indonesian Roman Catholic bishop.

== Biography ==
Woga was ordained a priest on 29 November 1977. In 1985 Woga took his vows and was professed a member of the Congregation of the Most Holy Redeemer.

On 4 April 2009 it was announced that Woga had been chosen as the new bishop of the Diocese of Weetebula, replacing Gerulfus Kherubim Pareira who had been installed as bishop of the Diocese of Maumere. On 16 July 2009 Woga was ordained bishop by Pareira was installed as the leader of the Diocese of Weetebula. As part of being ordained to the diocese on the island of Sumba, Woga vowed to help poor and marginalized people on the island, improve interfaith relations with Protestants and Muslims, as well as better faith formation for Catholic children.

Woga is also a writer, having published a book in January 2009 titled Misi, misiologi, dan evangelisasi di Indonesia, or Mission and evangelization of Catholic Church in Indonesia. His motto is "Praedicare Redemptionem" (Proclaiming the Redemption).

In September 2013 Woga was involved in a serious motorvehicle accident while traveling to a retreat in Nusa Dua, Bali. Woga's car was struck by a motorbike, and in the accident he suffered serious wounds and multiple fractures to his legs and thighs.
