= Residency (administrative division) =

Administrative division of British or Dutch empires

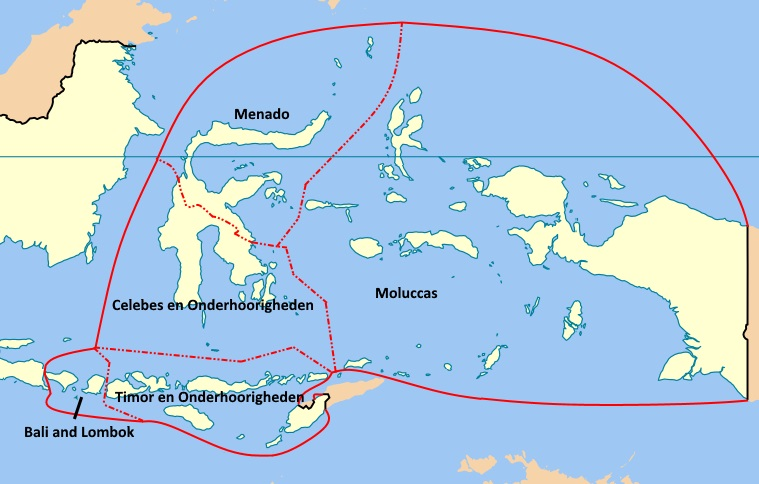
Dutch East Indies Residency in the Great East: Bali and Lombok Residency, Timor and Dependencies Residency, Maluku

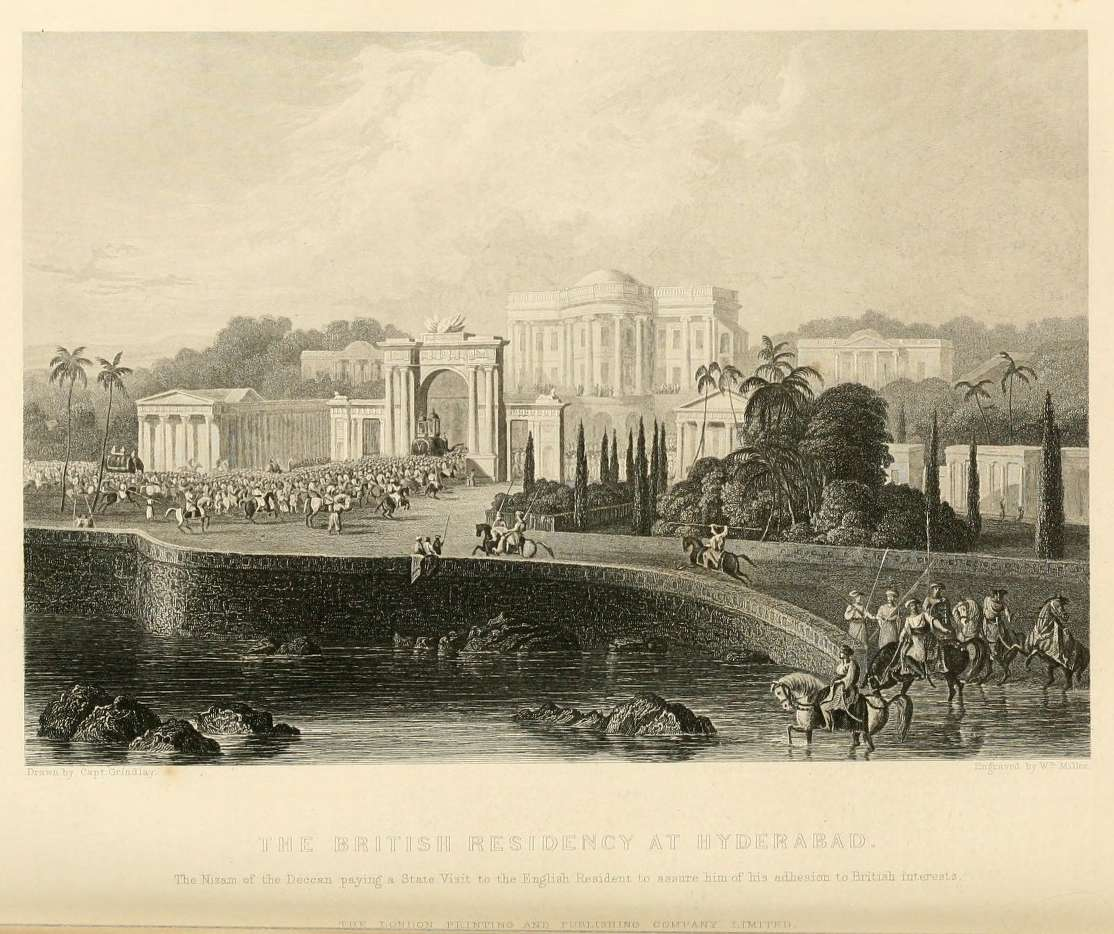
The British Residency at Hyderabad

A Residency was an administrative division of:

- the former British Empire. Most notable were the following:
  - British Residency of the Persian Gulf
  - Residencies of British India see: Category:Residencies of British India
- the Dutch East Indies, e.g.
  - Jambi Residency, Batavia Residency, Semarang Residency, etc. See Administrative divisions of the Dutch East Indies.

== See also ==
- Presidency (administrative division)
