= Bung Karno Seclusion House =

Coordinates: 3.79924°S 102.26129°E

Bung Karno Seclusion House refers to two houses in Indonesia in which Sukarno lived in during his time in exile. On January 14, 1934, he was exiled in Ende, Flores, where he stayed from 1934 to 1938. His home in Ende is now a museum. After that, he was exiled to Bengkulu city, Bengkulu until 1942.

== Exile House in Ende ==
Bung Karno Exile House, Ende
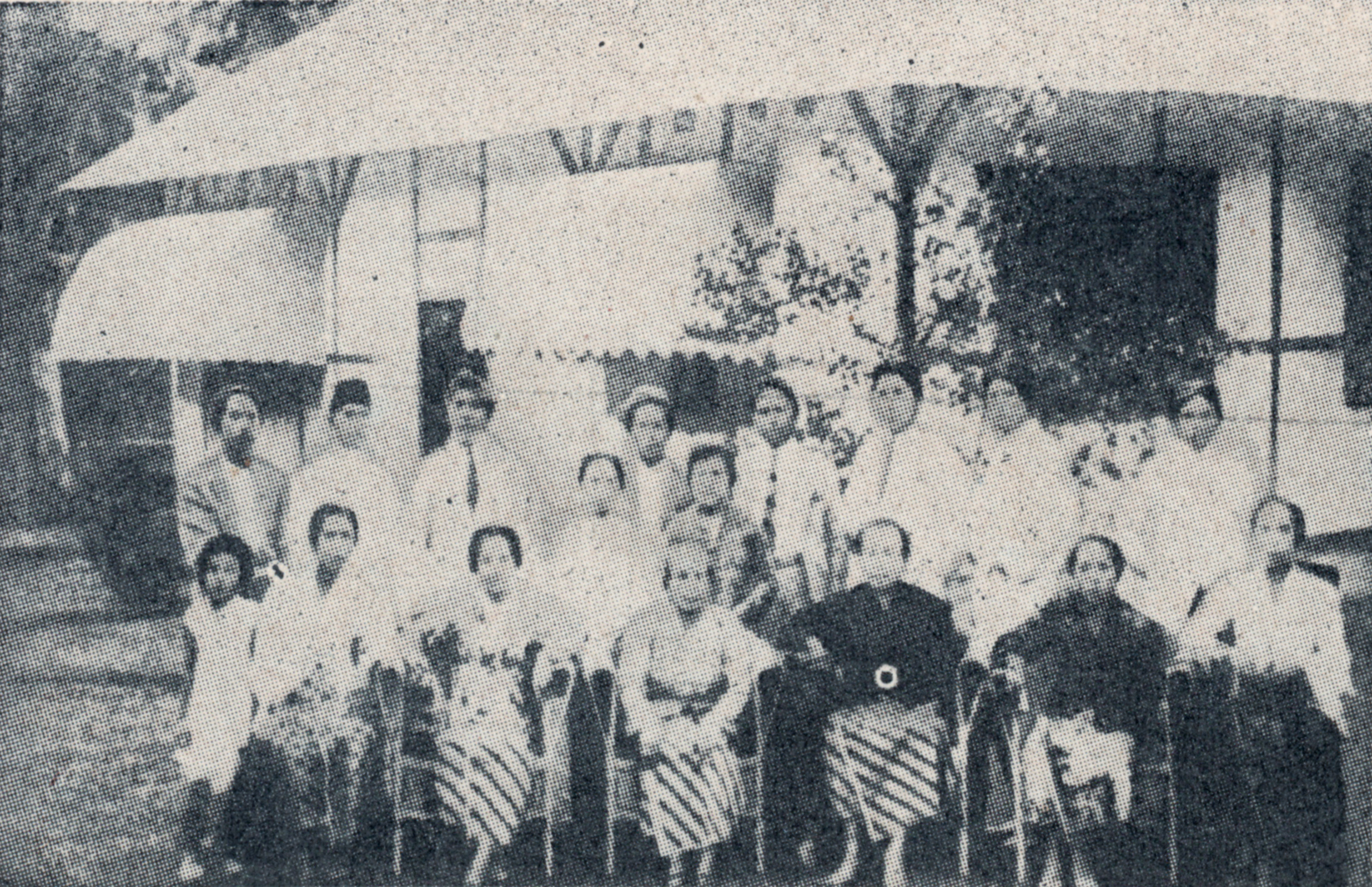
- Sukarno and friends at house in 1936
- Interactive map of Bung Karno Exile House, Ende

== Exile House in Bengkulu ==
Bung Karno Exile House, Bengkulu
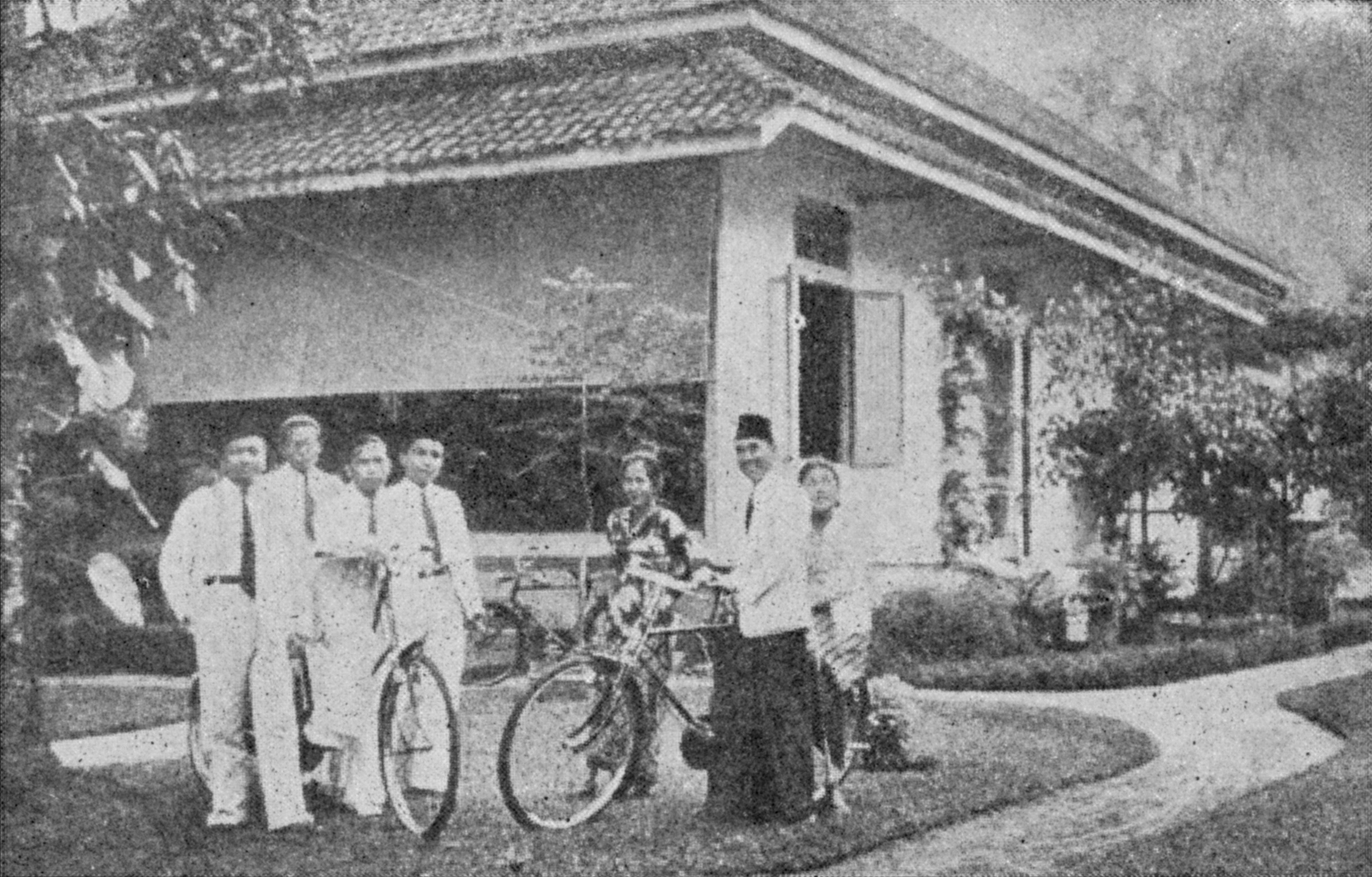
- Sukarno with wife and daughter at Bengkulu
- Interactive map of Bung Karno Exile House, Bengkulu

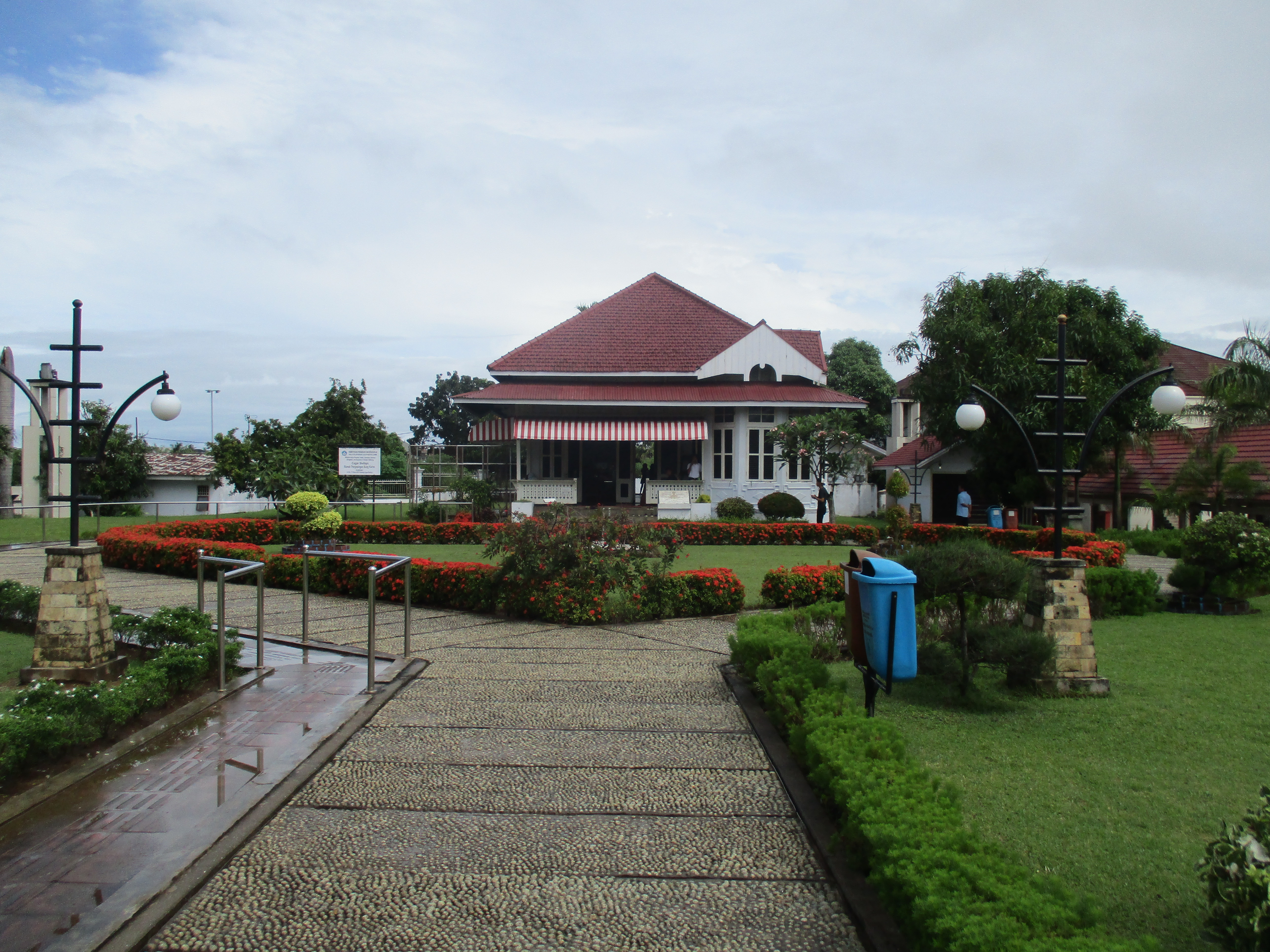
Exile House in Bengkulu is now a museum
