= Anton Pain Ratu =

Indonesian Roman Catholic bishop (1929–2024)

His Excellency Anton Pain Ratu S.V.D.
- Bishop Emeritus of Atambua
- Diocese: Kupang
- Appointed: 3 February 1984
- Term ended: 2 June 2007
- Predecessor: Theodorus van den Tillaart
- Successor: Dominikus Saku
- Previous posts: Auxiliary Bishop of Atambua and Titular Bishop of Zaba (1982–1984)

Orders
- Ordination: 17 August 1958 by Gabriel Manek
- Consecration: 21 September 1982 by Theodorus van den Tillaart

Personal details
- Born: 2 January 1929 Tanah Boleng, Dutch East Indies
- Died: 6 January 2024 (aged 95) Atambua, Indonesia
- Motto: Maranatha

Anton Pain Ratu (2 January 1929 – 6 January 2024) was an Indonesian Roman Catholic prelate who was auxiliary bishop of Atambua from 1982 to 1984 and bishop of Atambua from 1984 to 2007. Ratu died in Atambua on 6 January 2024, at the age of 95.

Catholic Church titles
Preceded by Theodorus van den Tillaart	Bishop of Atambua; 1984–2007	Succeeded by Dominikus Saku
Preceded by Luciano Giovannetti	Titular Bishop of Zaba; 1982–1984	Succeeded by Juan de Dios Pueblos
Preceded by —	Auxiliary Bishop of Atambua; 1982–1984	Succeeded by —
