= Diocese of Atambua =

Roman Catholic diocese on Timor, Indonesia

Coordinates: 9°06′S 124°53′E

Diocese of Atambua Dioecesis Atambuensis Keuskupan Atambua

Location
- Country: Indonesia
- Ecclesiastical province: Kupang
- Metropolitan: Kupang

Statistics
- Area: 5,177 km^{2} (1,999 sq mi)
- Population: Total; Catholics: (as of 2012); 561,000; 553,712 (98.7%)
- Parishes: 65

Information
- Rite: Latin Rite
- Cathedral: Cathedral of the Immaculate Conception in Atambua

Current leadership
- Pope: Leo XIV
- Bishop: Dominikus Saku
- Metropolitan Archbishop: Peter Turang

The Roman Catholic Diocese of Atambua (Latin: Atambuen(sis)) is a Latin suffragan diocese in the ecclesiastical province of the Metropolitan of Kupang, in Indonesia, yet still dependent of the Roman Congregation for the Evangelization of Peoples.

Its cathedral episcopal see is Katedral Santa Maria Imakulata (dedicated to Mary Immaculate) located in the town of Atambua.

== History ==
- Established on 25 May 1936 as the Apostolic Vicariate of Dutch Timor, on territory split off from the then Apostolic Vicariate of Lesser Sunda Islands
- Renamed on 11 November 1948 after its see as Apostolic Vicariate of Atambua.
- Promoted 3 January 1961 as Diocese of Atambua, yet still missionary.
- Lost territory on 13 April 1967 to establish the then Diocese of Kupang, now its Metropolitan.

== Ordinaries ==
(all Roman rite, till 2007 members of a Latin missionary congregation)

Apostolic Vicar of Dutch Timor

- Jacques Pessers, Divine Word Missionaries (S.V.D.) (June 1, 1937 – November 11, 1948 see below), Titular Bishop of Candyba (1937.06.01 – 1961.04.03)

Apostolic Vicars of Atambua

- Jacques Pessers, S.V.D. (see above November 11, 1948 – January 3, 1961 see below)
- Theodorus van den Tillaart, S.V.D. (November 14, 1957 – January 3, 1961 see below), Titular Bishop of Mulia (1957.11.14 – 1961.01.03)

Suffragan Bishops of Atambua

- Jacques Pessers, S.V.D. (see above January 3, 1961 – death April 3, 1961)
- Theodorus van den Tillaart, S.V.D. (see above January 3, 1961 – retired February 3, 1984)
- Anton Pain Ratu, S.V.D. (February 3, 1984 – retired June 2, 2007), previously Titular Bishop of Zaba (1982.04.02 – 1984.02.03) & Auxiliary Bishop of Atambua (1982.04.02 – 1984.02.03)
- Dominikus Saku (June 2, 2007 – ...)

== Sources and external links ==
- Official website
- GCatholic.org, with incumbent biography links
- Catholic Hierarchy
