= Donatus Djagom =

- archbishop Diocese of Ende (Emeritus)
- Church: Roman Catholic Church
- See: Diocese of Ende
- In office: 1968–96
- Predecessor: Gabriel Wilhelmus Manek
- Successor: Longinus Da Cunha
- Previous post: Priest

Orders
- Ordination: 28 August 1949

Personal details
- Born: 10 May 1919 Bilas, Indonesia
- Died: 29 November 2011 (aged 92)

Donatus Djagom (10 May 1919 – 29 November 2011) was an Indonesian Bishop of the Roman Catholic Church.

Djagom was born in Bilas, Indonesia and ordained a priest on 28 August 1949 from the religious order of Society of Divine Word. He was appointed bishop of the Roman Catholic Archdiocese of Ende on 19 December 1968 and ordained archbishop on 11 June 1969. Djagom retired on 23 February 1996.

== Background ==
Djagom's minor seminary education began in Mataloko, Flores. After Djagom entered the SVD Novitiate, he continued to study philosophy at the Ledalero Higher Seminary. After World War II, he continued his theological studies at the SVD Higher Seminary in Teteringen, Netherlands. He was ordained a priest Society of the Divine Word on 28 August 1949 in Teteringen, Netherlands. He then continued his English studies at the University of San Carlos, Cebu, Philippines.
