= Vincentius Sensi Potokota =

Indonesian Catholic archbishop (1951–2023)

- Archbishop of Ende
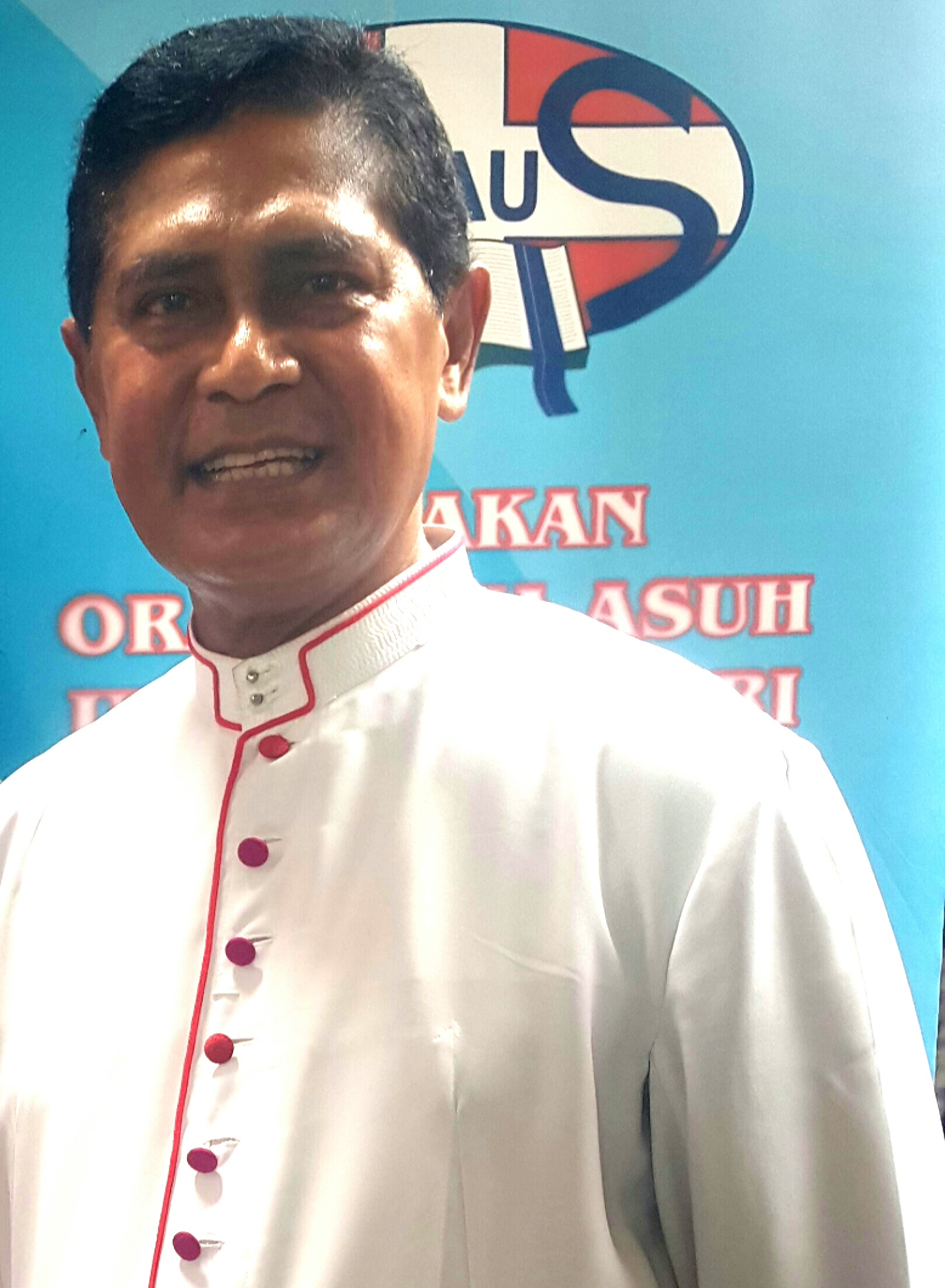
- Potokota in 2017
- Church: Roman Catholic Church
- Archdiocese: Ende
- Appointed: 14 April 2007
- Installed: 7 June 2007
- Term ended: 19 November 2023
- Predecessor: Longinus Da Cunha
- Successor: Paulus Budi Kleden, S.V.D.
- Previous post: Bishop of Maumere (2006–2007)

Orders
- Ordination: 11 May 1980
- Consecration: 23 April 2006 by Julius Darmaatmadja, S.J.

Personal details
- Born: 11 July 1951 Saga, Detusoko, Ende, East Nusa Tenggara, Indonesia
- Died: 19 November 2023 (aged 72) Jakarta, Indonesia
- Motto: Prædica Verbum, Opportune Importune (Preach the word, in good or bad times - 2 Timothy 4:2)
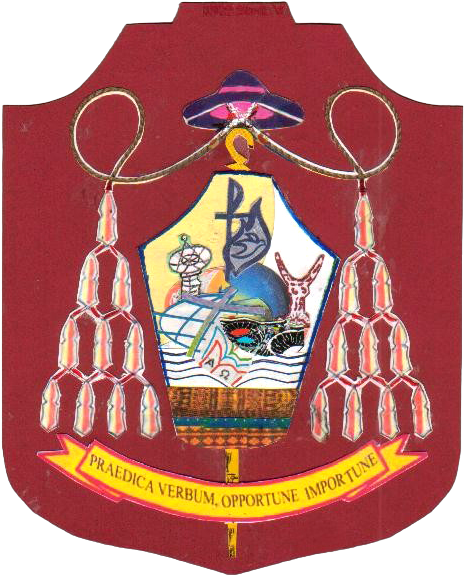
- Coat of arms

Styles of Vincentius Sensi Potokota
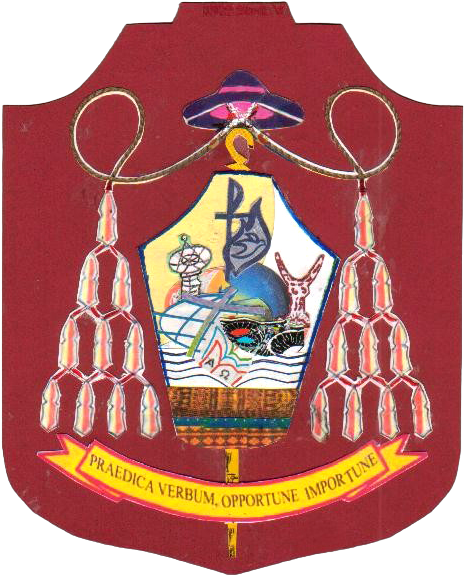
- Reference style: His Excellency; The Most Reverend
- Spoken style: Your Excellency
- Religious style: Archbishop

Vincentius Sensi Potokota (11 July 1951 – 19 November 2023) was an Indonesian prelate of the Roman Catholic Church who served as the eighth archbishop of the Archdiocese of Ende from 2007 to his death in 2023. Previously, he served as the first bishop of the Diocese of Maumere from 2006 to 2007.

== Biography ==
Born in Ende Regency, Potokota was ordained priest in the Archdiocese of Ende on 11 May 1980.

On 14 December 2005, Potokota was appointed the bishop of the newly established Diocese of Maumere. The episcopal ordination took place on 23 April 2006, with the Archbishop of Jakarta, Cardinal Julius Darmaatmadja S.J. ordaining Potokota as bishop. The co-consecratos of the event were then-bishop of Weetebula Gerulfus Kherubim Pareira S.V.D., and then-bishop of Pangkal Pinang Hilarius Moa Nurak S.V.D.

Little more than a year after being ordained bishop of Maumere, Potokota was installed as archbishop of the Archdioceses of Ende after the death of Longinus Da Cunha. Potokota was installed as archbishop on 7 June 2007.

As archbishop of the diocese, Potokota has campaigned on several issues in East Nusa Tenggara, such as discouraging mining and deforestation in the province because of the damage it causes to the environment.

Potokota died in Jakarta on 19 November 2023, at the age of 72 In Charles Borromeus Hospital.

Catholic Church titles
Preceded by Longinus Da Cunha	Archbishop of Ende; 2007–2023	Succeeded by Paulus Budi Kleden
Preceded by First	Bishop of Maumere; 2006–2007	Succeeded by Gerulfus Kherubim Pareira
