= Diocese of Maumere =

Roman Catholic diocese in Indonesia

Coordinates: 8°37′S 122°14′E

Diocese of Maumere Dioecesis Maumerensis Keuskupan Maumere
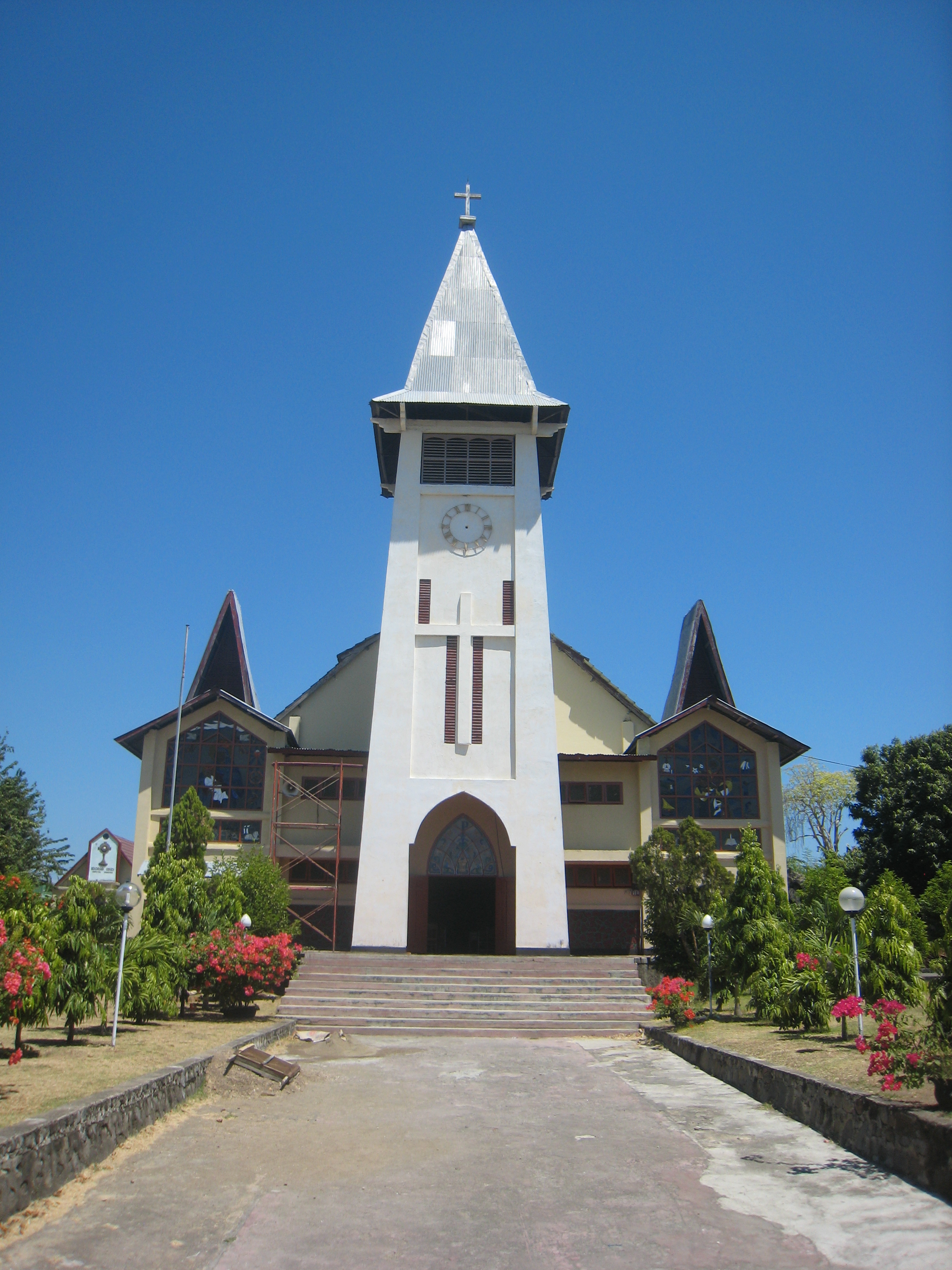
- Cathedral of Maumere

Location
- Country: Indonesia
- Ecclesiastical province: Ende
- Metropolitan: Ende

Statistics
- Area: 1,731 km^{2} (668 sq mi)
- Population: Total; Catholics: (as of 2023); 342,000; 297,000 (86.8%)
- Parishes: 36

Information
- Denomination: Catholic
- Sui iuris church: Latin Church
- Rite: Roman Rite
- Established: 14 December 2005; 20 years ago
- Cathedral: Cathedral of St Joseph in Maumere
- Secular priests: 240 (63 Diocesan, 177 Religious Orders)

Current leadership
- Pope: Leo XIV
- Bishop: Ewaldus Martinus Sedu
- Metropolitan Archbishop: Paul Boedhie Kleden, S.V.D.

The Roman Catholic Diocese of Maumere (Dioecesis Maumerensis) in Indonesia was created on 14 December 2005, by splitting it from the Archdiocese of Ende, which is still the metropolitan of the diocese. Its first bishop is Vincentius Sensi. The St Joseph church in Maumere is the cathedral of the diocese.

The diocese covers an area of 1,731 km^{2}, coinciding with the civil district Sikka on the eastern part of the island Flores. As of 2023, 297,000 of the 342,000 people in the area are members of the Catholic Church. The diocese is subdivided into 36 parishes.

== Ordinaries ==
Bishops of Maumere (Roman Rite)

- Vincentius Sensi Potokota (14 December 2005 – 14 April 2007), appointed Archbishop of Ende
- Gerulfus Kherubim Pareira, S.V.D. (19 January 2008 – 14 July 2018), retired
- Ewaldus Martinus Sedu (14 July 2018 – Present)

== See also ==
- List of Roman Catholic dioceses in Indonesia
