= Timor and Dependencies Residency =

Residency of Timor and Dependencies Keresidenan Timor dan Dependensi (Indonesian) Timor Rezidensia no Dependensia sira (Tetun)
- 1819-1949
- Flag

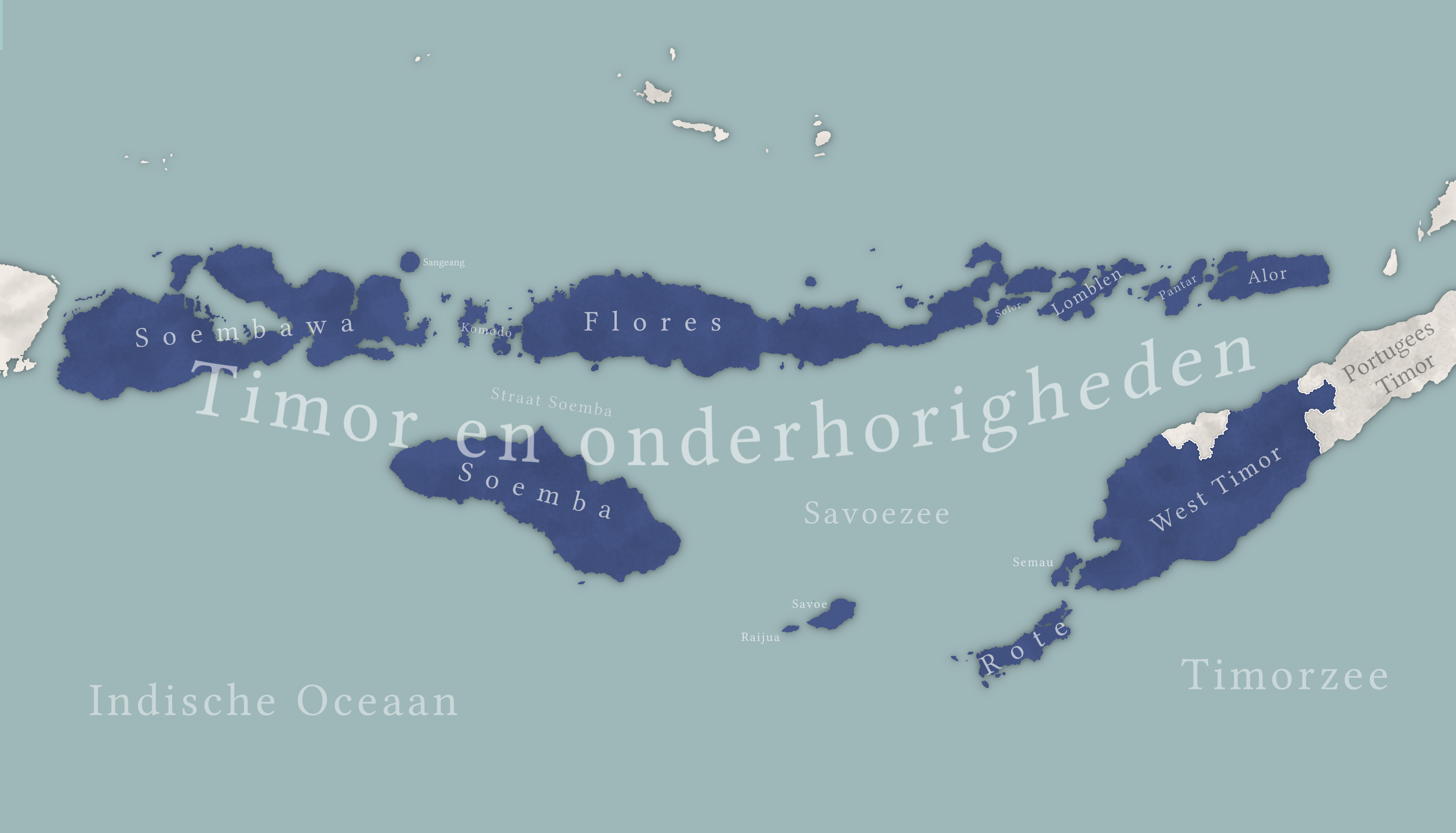
- Capital: Koepang
  - Type: Colonial Administration
- History
  - Separation From Molucas Governorate: 1819
  - Occupation by the Japanese: 1943
  - Disestablished: 1949
Preceded by	Succeeded by
Dutch East Indies	Japanese occupation of the Dutch East Indies; State of East Indonesia

The Timor and Dependencies Residency (Dutch: Residentie Timor en Onderhoorigheden; Indonesian: Karesidenan Timor dan Kepulauannya) was an administrative subdivision (Residency) of the Dutch East Indies located in the Eastern half of Lesser Sunda Islands east of Lombok, it was separated in 1819 from the Governorate of Moluccas (Gouvernement der Molukken. Its capital was at Kupang.

== Administrative divisions ==
The Residency was divided into four divisions (afdelingen): Soembawa, Soemba, Flores and Timor en eilanden Soembawa division was divided to two subdistricts of Soembawa and Bima. Soemba division was divided to two subdistricts of West- and East-Soemba. Flores division was divided to five subdistricts of Manggarai, Ngada, Endeh, Maoemere, Oost-Flores en Solor-Eilanden, and Alor subdivision Timor en eilanden was divided to five subdistricts of Beloe, Noord-Midden Timor, Zuid-Midden Timor, Koepang, and Roti en Sawoe. Since Indonesian independence these subdistricts (Onderafdelingen) have been turned to Regencies (Kabupaten).

== List of the Residents of Timor en Onderhoorigheden ==
- Hendrick Hendricksz van Oldenburgh (on Solor), 1646–1648
- Hendrick ter Horst (on Solor), 1648–1654
- Jacob Verheyden (on Solor), 1654–1655
- Cornelis Ockersz (on Solor, acting), 1655
- Hendrick ter Horst (on Solor until 1657), 1655–1659
- Joseph Margits, 1659–1660
- Johan Truytman (commissioner), 1660
- Hugo Cuylenburgh, 1660–1665
- Anthony Hurt, 1665–1667
- Jacob Pietersz van den Kerper, 1667–1670
- Jacob Lidema (acting), 1670–1672
- Jacob van Wijckersloot, 1672–1680
- Joannes van den Broeck, 1681–1683
- Willem Tange (acting) 1683-1684
- Jan van Heden 1684-1684
- Willem Tange, 1684–1685
- Gerrit Hoofd, 1685–1686
- Willem Moerman, 1686–1687
- Arend Verhoeven 1687
- Willem Moerman, 1687–1698
- François van den Eynde, 1698
- Willem Moerman, 1698–1699
- Joan Focanus, 1699–1702
- Joannes van Alphen, 1702–1706
- Didloff Blad, 1706–1712
- Reynier Leers, 1712–1714
- Isaac Marmer, 1714
- Leendert Grim (acting), 1714–1715
- Willem van Putten, 1715–1717
- Barend van der Swaan, 1717–1721
- Hendrick Engelert, 1721–1725
- Balthazar de Moucheron, 1725–1728
- Steven Palm (acting), 1728–1729
- Anthony Hurt, 1729–1730
- Gerardus Bernardus Visscher, 1730–1736
- Aart Jansz Peper, 1736–1739
- Pieter Jacob Blok, 1739
- Aart Jansz Peper, 1739–1740
- Jan Dinnies, 1740-1740
- Christiaan Fredrik Brandenburg (acting), 1740–1741
- Anthony Cornelis van Oldenbarnevelt (Tulling), 1741–1742
- Christiaan Fredrik Brandenburg (acting), 1742–1744
- Jan Anthony Meulenbeek, 1744–1746
- Gilles Jacob Helmmuts (acting), 1746–1747
- Johannes Steenwegh (acting), 1747-1747/48
- Daniel van der Burgh, 1748–1754
- Elias Jacob Beynon, 1754–1758
- Johannes Andreas Paravicini (commissioner), 1756
- Hans Albrecht von Plüskow, 1758–1761
- Johan Willem Erland Daniel ter Herbruggen, 1762–1765
- Bartholomeus van Voorst, 1765–1766
- Willem Adriaan van Este (acting), 1766–1767
- Alexander Cornabé, 1767–1772
- Barend Willem Fokkens, 1772–1777
- Willem Adriaan van Este, 1777–1789
- Timotheus Wanjon, 1789–1797
- Carel Gratus Greving, 1797–1799
- J. Doser (commissioner), 1799–1800
- Hans Andries Lofsteth (commissioner), 1800–1802
- Johannes Giesler, 1802–1803
- Frans Philip Christiaan Kurtzen (acting), 1803–1804
- Pieter Bernardus van Kruijne, 1804–1807
- Frans Philip Christiaan Kurtzen (acting), 1807
- Pieter Stopkerb, 1807–1810
- Jacobus Arnoldus Hazaart, 1810–1812
- Cornelis Willem Knibbe (under British rule), 1812
- Watson (under British rule), 1812
- Joseph Burn (under British rule), 1812–1814
- Curtois (under British rule, acting), 1814
- Jacobus Arnoldus Hazaart (under British rule until 1816), 1814–18
- M. Haleweijn (acting), 1818–1819
- Jacobus Arnoldus Hazaart, 1819–1832
- Emanuel A. Francis (commissioner) 1831-32
- Johan Baptist Spanoghe, 1833–1835
- Carel Frederik Goldman, 1835–1836
- Diderik Johan van den Dungen Gronovius, 1836–1841
- Cornelis Sluyter, 1841–1844
- Siegfried George Friedrich Fraenkel, 1844–1845
- Cornelis Sluyter, 1845–1848
- Dirk Wouter Jacob Carel, Baron van Lynden, 1849–1852
- Frederik Marie Gerard van Cattenburch (acting), 1852
- Jhr. Theodoor van Capellen, 1852–1856
- Siegfried George Friedrich Fraenkel, 1856–1858
- Johannes Grudelbach, 1858–1859
- Willem Leendert Hendrik Brocx, 1859–1861
- Isaac Esser (acting), 1861–1863
- Roelof Wijnen, 1863–1864
- Jan George Coorengel, 1864–1869
- Johan Arnoud Caspersz, 1869–1872
- Jan Karel de Wit, 1872–1873
- Hendrik Carel Humme, 1873–1875
- Charles Matthieu George Arinus Marinus Ecoma Verstege, 1875–1878
- Johann Gerard Friedrich Riedel, 1878–1880
- Willem Fredrik Sikman, 1880–1881
- Salomon Roos, 1882–1884
- W. Greve, 1884–1888
- Guillaume Gérard de Villeneuve, 1888–1890
- Willem Cornelis Hoogkamer, 1890–1893
- Cornelis Marius Eduard Merens, 1893–1895
- J. L. J. A. Ruijssenaers, 1895
- J. van Wijck, 1896–1898
- Fokko Fokkens (acting), 1898–1899
- Johannes Vijzelaar, 1899–1902
- Frits Anton Heckler, 1902–1905
- J. F. A. de Rooy, 1906–1908
- E. F. J. Loriaux, 1908–1911
- C. H. van Rieschoten, 1911–1913
- Ernst Gustav Theodoor Maier, 1913–1917
- K. A. James, 1917–1918
- Anthony Hendrik Spaan, 1918–1921
- A. J. L. Couvreur, 1921–1924
- C. Schultz 1924-1927
- Paulus Franciscus Josephus Karthaus, 1927–1931
- Eugene Henri de Nijs Bik, 1931–1934
- Johan Jacob Bosch, 1934–1938
- Fokko Jan Nieboer, 1938–1942
- Cornelis Woutherus Schüller, 1945–1948
- A. Verhoef, 1948–1949
