= Archdiocese of Ende =

Roman Catholic archdiocese in the Lesser Sunda Islands, Indonesia

Coordinates: 8.8333°S 121.6500°E

Metropolitan Archdiocese of Ende Archidioecesis Metropolitae Endehena Keuskupan Agung Metropolitan Ende
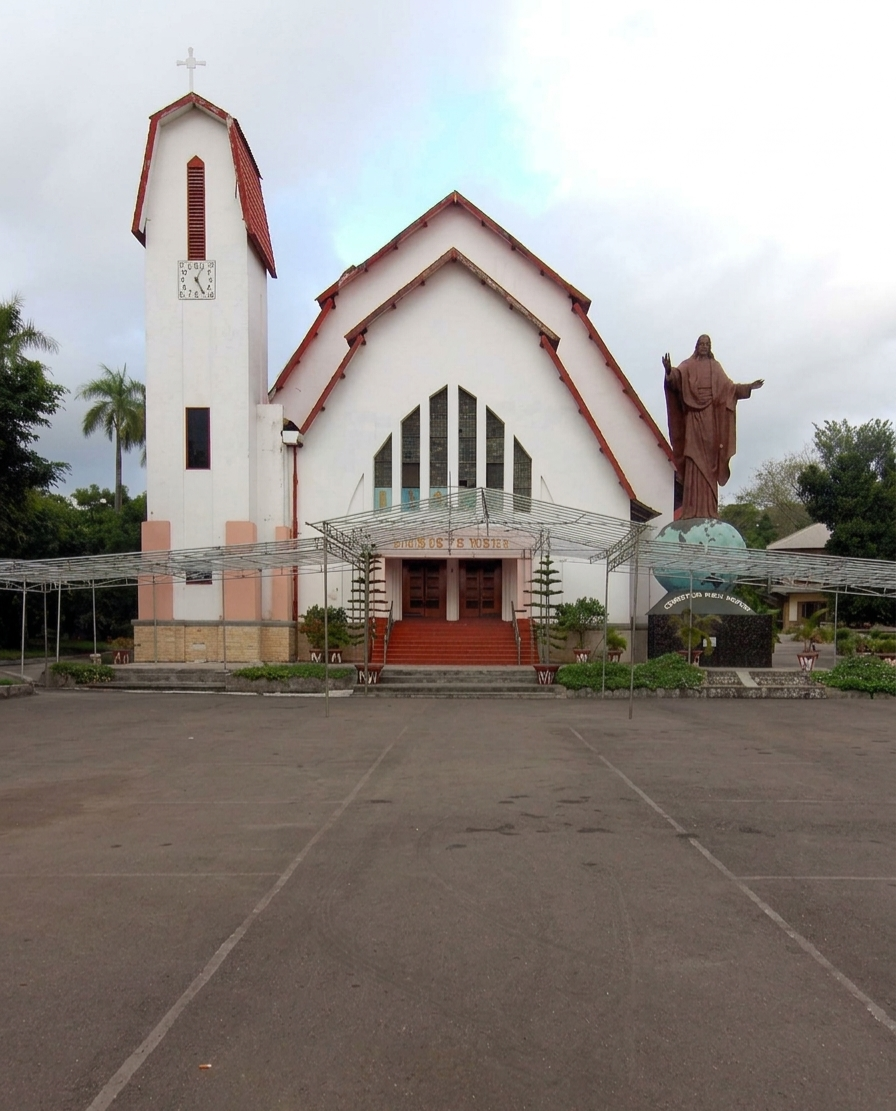
- Christ the King Cathedral in Ende

Location
- Country: Indonesia
- Ecclesiastical province: Ende

Statistics
- Area: 5,084 km^{2} (1,963 sq mi)
- Population: Total; Catholics: (as of 2006); 454,000; 416,000 (91.6%)

Information
- Rite: Latin Rite
- Cathedral: Christ the King Cathedral in Ende, East Nusa Tenggara

Current leadership
- Pope: Leo XIV
- Metropolitan Archbishop: Mons. Dr. Paul Boedhie Kleden, S.V.D.

The Roman Catholic Metropolitan Archdiocese of Ende (Latin: Archidioecesis Metropolitae Endehena) is a Latin metropolitan archdiocese in the Lesser Sunda Islands, Indonesia.

Its cathedral is the Christ the King Cathedral in the city of Ende, Nusa Tenggara Timur.

== History ==
The archdiocese was established on 16 September 1913 as Apostolic Prefecture of Lesser Sunda Islands, on territory split from what was then Apostolic Vicariate of Batavia (now Archdiocese of Jakarta, then covering the Dutch East Indies).

On 12 March 1922 the prefecture was promoted to Apostolic Vicariate of Lesser Sunda Islands (curiate Italian: Isole della Piccola Sonda), hence entitled to a titular bishop. On 25 February 1936 the vicariate was split to establish the Apostolic Vicariate of Dutch Timor. On 10 July 1950 the vicariate was split to establish the Apostolic Prefecture of Denpasar. On 8 March 1951 it was named Apostolic Vicariate of Endeh, after its see, having lost territories to establish the Apostolic Vicariate of Larantuka and the Apostolic Vicariate of Ruteng. On 20 October 1959 another split established the Apostolic Prefecture of Weetebula. On 3 January 1961 it became Metropolitan Archdiocese of Endeh. On 14 May 1974 it was renamed Metropolitan Archdiocese of Ende. On 14 December 2005 the archdiocese was again split to establish the diocese of Maumere.

== Ordinaries ==
(all Roman Rite; missionary members of a Latin congregation till 1996)

=== Apostolic Prefect of Lesser Sunda Islands (Isole della Piccola Sonda) ===
- Fr. Pietro Noyen, Divine Word Missionaries (S.V.D.) (1913 – death 1921)

=== Apostolic Vicars of Lesser Sunda Islands ===
- Arnoldo Verstraelen, S.V.D. (14 March 1922 – death 15 March 1932), Titular Bishop of Myriophytos (13 March 1922 – 15 March 1932)
- Enrico Leven, S.V.D. (25 April 1933 – 1950), Titular Bishop of Arca in Armenia (25 April 1933 – death 31 January 1953)

=== Apostolic Vicar of Endeh ===
- Antoine Hubert Thijssen, S.V.D. (8 March 1951 – 3 January 1961), Titular Bishop of Nilopolis (8 March 1951 – 3 January 1961); later Bishop of Larantuka (Indonesia) (3 January 1961 – 23 February 1973), Apostolic Administrator of Denpasar (Indonesia) (1973 – 4 September 1980), Titular Bishop of Eguga (23 February 1973 – 7 June 1982)

=== Metropolitan Archbishops of Endeh ===
- Gabriel Manek, S.V.D. (3 January 1961 – 19 December 1968), previously Titular Bishop of Alinda (8 March 1951 – 3 January 1961) & Apostolic Vicar of Larantuka (Indonesia) (8 March 1951 – 3 January 1961); emeritate as Titular Archbishop of Bavagaliana (19 December 1968 – 15 May 1976)

=== Metropolitan Archbishops of Ende ===
- Donatus Djagom, S.V.D. (19 December 1968 – 23 February 1996)
- Longinus Da Cunha (23 February 1996 – 6 April 2006)
- Vincentius Sensi Potokota (14 April 2007 – 19 November 2023) (Died), previously Bishop of Maumere (Indonesia) (14 December 2005 – 14 April 2007)
- Paul Boedhie Kleden, S.V.D. (25 May 2024 - ...)

== Province ==
Its ecclesiastical province comprises the metropolitan's own archdiocese and these suffragan bishoprics:

- Roman Catholic Diocese of Denpasar
- Roman Catholic Diocese of Labuan Bajo
- Roman Catholic Diocese of Larantuka
- Roman Catholic Diocese of Maumere
- Roman Catholic Diocese of Ruteng

== Source and External links ==
- GCatholic.org, with incumbent biography links
- Catholic Hierarchy
