= Maumere =

- Town
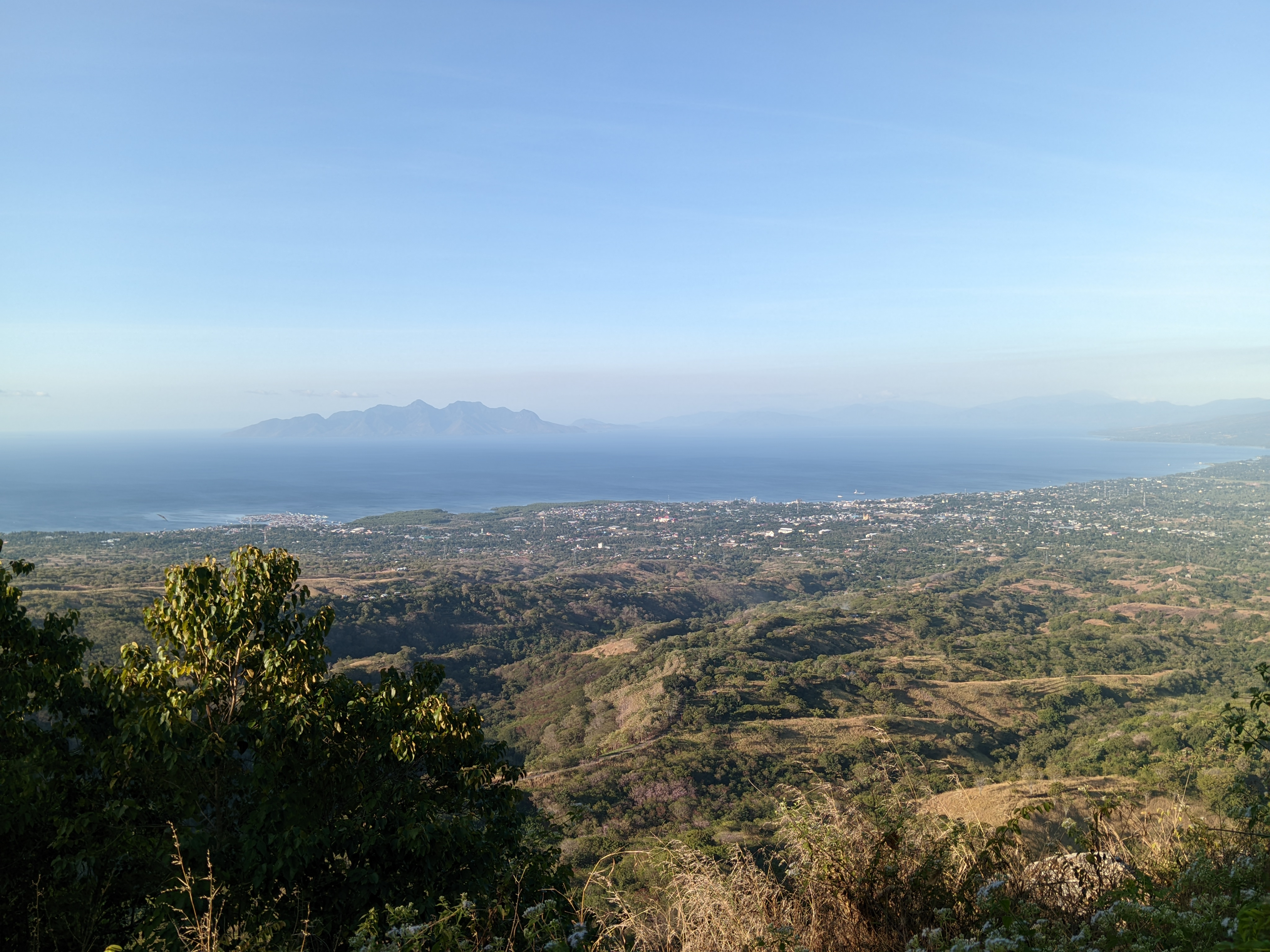
- Nickname(s): Rome of Indonesia; Rome of the East
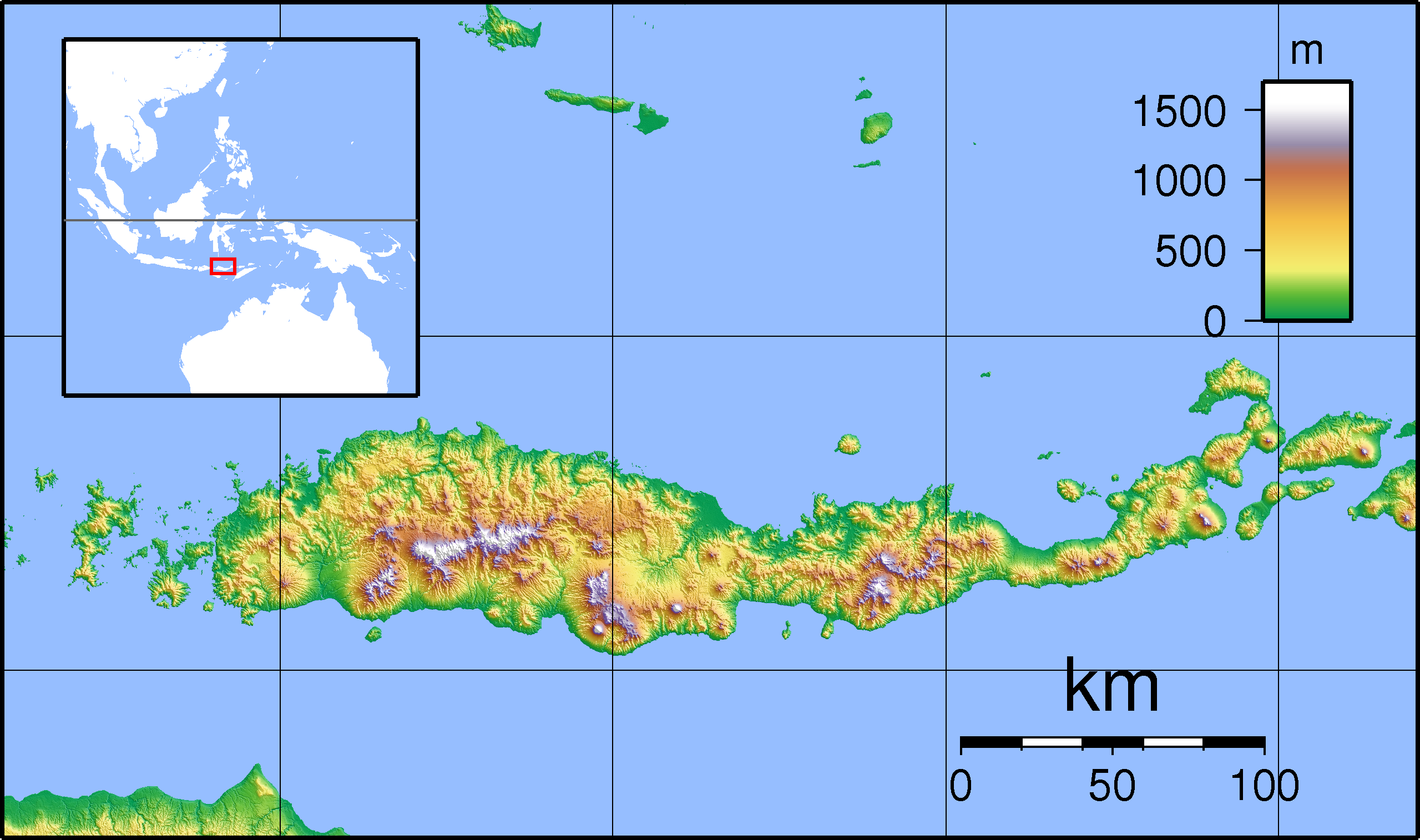
- Location in Indonesia Maumere (Indonesia)
- Coordinates: 8°37′20″S 122°12′44″E
- Country: Indonesia
- Region: Lesser Sunda Islands
- Province: East Nusa Tenggara
- Regency: Sikka

Area
  - Total: 123.26 km^{2} (47.59 sq mi)

Population (mid 2024 estimate)
  - Total: 79,515
  - Density: 645.10/km^{2} (1,670.8/sq mi)
- excluding offshore islands
- Time zone: UTC+8 (WITA)

Maumere is the administrative seat of the Sikka Regency and the second largest town (its nominal population has recently overtaken Ende, but of these over 10,500 live in rural areas on outlying islands) on Flores Island, Indonesia. It lies on the north coast of the island and the port is in the north-west part of the town. Administratively, the town is not a single district (kecamatan) within the regency, but is divided into three districts, namely Alok Barat (West Alok), Alok, and Alok Timur (East Alok), although the latter two districts also include a number of substantial islands off the north coast of Flores.

== Population ==
The population of Maumere is mainly made up of the native Sikka people, but there are also some of Portuguese descent who are called the mestiços. Apart from that, there are also the Lio, Palue, Bajau, Bugis, and the Javanese who migrated here. The population speaks Indonesian and Maumere Malay, a local Malay-based creole, as a lingua franca. The most widely spoken regional language is Sikka, then Lio, and others. A Portuguese-based creole form was spoken until the late 20th century, before being replaced by Indonesian and local Malay.

In 1992, Maumere had a total population of about 70,000, but the town suffered considerable damage in the 1992 Flores earthquake and tsunami, with 90 percent of all buildings being destroyed. The Census population of the three districts (Alak Barat, Alak, and Alak Timur) in 2010 was 82,039 and 87,720 in 2020; the official estimate as at mid 2024 was 92,095; however this included 10,875 inhabitants of offshore islands, so that the 2024 figure for the town itself was 79,515.

In 2005, the Roman Catholic Diocese of Maumere was established in the town.

The reefs in areas surrounding Maumere (the Maumere Gulf) were once considered some of the finest diving in the world. However, a 2007 report found that 75% of the coral reefs had been significantly damaged or destroyed by the practice of bomb fishing, the use of toxic chemicals in fishing, and due to earthquakes. One priority of the local community and government is the promotion of tourism. An annual cultural event, Maumere in Love, has been initiated as a step towards fostering both local and wider interest in the region around Maumere.

== Administrative division ==
The three districts (kecamatan) are sub-divided into 13 urban subdistricts (kelurahan) and 8 rural villages (desa):

- Alok Barat (West Alok), consists of the four kelurahan of Hewuli, Wailiti, Wolomarang, and Wuring, with 24,548 inhabitants in mid 2024.
- Alok, consists of the four kelurahan of Kabor, Kota Uneng, Madawat, and Nangalimang, with 26,957 inhabitants in mid 2024; plus the three desa of Gunung Sari, Pemana (together comprising Pemana Island offshore, with 4,956 inhabitants in 2024), and Samparong (comprising Samparong Island, further north in the Flores Sea, with 1,049 inhabitants in 2024).
- Alok Timur (East Alok), consists of the five kelurahan of Beru, Kota Baru, Nangameting, Waioti, and Wairotang, with 24,096 inhabitants in mid 2024; plus the six desa, of which Lepolima (2,441), Watugong (1,473), and Gong Bekor (1,415) are all also on Flores Island but are situated immediately south of the 5 kelurahan, while Kojadoi (1,558) and Kojagete (1,585) together compose Koja Island (or Pulau Besar), while Perumaan (2,007) consists of nearly Perumaan Island and similar small islands, all closer to the northwest coast of Talibura district.

Thus the population of the urban town itself in 2024 was 79,515 (including 5,329 in the villages of Lepolima, Watugong, and Gong Bekor) while the other 12,570 inhabitants were on the various offshore islands.

Kode Wilayah	Name of kelurahan or desa	Area in km^{2}	Pop'n Estimate mid 2024	Post code
53.07.14.1001	Hewuli	11.56	3,168	86115
53.07.14.1002	Wailiti	16.63	3,989	86114
53.07.14.1003	Wolomarang	5.50	11,694	86114
53.07.14.1004	Wuring	15.14	5,697	86115
53.07.14	Totals Alok Barat District	48.83	24,548	
53.07.05.1006	Madawat	2.29	8,915	86112
53.07.05.1007	Nangalimang	3.71	3,748	86118
53.07.05.1008	Kabor	0.34	3,291	86112
53.07.05.1009	Kota Uneng	3.01	11,003	86113
53.07.05.2014	Pemana	3.42	3,268	86116
53.07.05.2015	Samparong	3.71	1,049	86116
53.07.05.2016	Gunung Sari	2.90	1,688	86116
53.07.05	Totals Alok District	19.38	32,962	
53.07.15.1001	Beru	4.15	3,945	86111
53.07.15.1002	Kota Baru	3.26	6,134	86215
53.07.15.1003	Nangameting	29.19	4,351	86118
53.07.15.1004	Waioti	4.59	7,111	86118
53.07.15.1005	Wairotang	23.37	2,555	86111
53.07.15.2006	Kojadoi	3.99	1,558	86116
53.07.15.2007	Kojagete	1.24	1,585	86116
53.07.15.2008	Lepolima	1.08	2,441	86116
53.07.15.2009	Perumaan	0.87	2,007	86116
53.07.15.2010	Watugong	2.44	1,473	86116
53.07.15.2011	Gong Bekor	0.25	1,415	86116
53.10.12	Totals Alok Timur District	74.43	34,585	

== Mother of All Nations ==
Mother of All Nations (Indonesian: Bunda Segala Bangsa) is a statue of Mother Mary in Nilo Hill, 5 kilometres or 3.1 miles south-west from Maumere. The statue stands 18 metres or 59 feet tall, but with its pedestal and foundation it is 28 metres or 92 feet tall. The 6-ton copper-clad statue was constructed in 2005, located at the peak of the 500 metres or 1,640 feet Keli hill, Nilo village, and has become the tallest statue raised in Sikka Regency.

== Transportation ==
The city is served by Frans Xavier Seda Airport or Maumere Airport.

== Climate ==
Maumere has a tropical savanna climate (Köppen Aw) with a long dry season and short wet season.

Climate data for Maumere (1991–2020 normals)
Month	Jan	Feb	Mar	Apr	May	Jun	Jul	Aug	Sep	Oct	Nov	Dec	Year
Mean daily maximum °C (°F)	31.1 (88.0)	30.9 (87.6)	31.7 (89.1)	32.4 (90.3)	32.2 (90.0)	31.6 (88.9)	31.2 (88.2)	31.6 (88.9)	32.7 (90.9)	33.5 (92.3)	33.8 (92.8)	32.3 (90.1)	32.1 (89.8)
Daily mean °C (°F)	27.4 (81.3)	27.1 (80.8)	27.5 (81.5)	27.9 (82.2)	27.8 (82.0)	26.9 (80.4)	26.6 (79.9)	26.6 (79.9)	27.5 (81.5)	28.6 (83.5)	29.2 (84.6)	28.0 (82.4)	27.6 (81.7)
Mean daily minimum °C (°F)	24.7 (76.5)	24.3 (75.7)	24.6 (76.3)	24.5 (76.1)	24.6 (76.3)	23.9 (75.0)	23.0 (73.4)	22.5 (72.5)	23.3 (73.9)	24.6 (76.3)	25.4 (77.7)	25.1 (77.2)	24.2 (75.6)
Average precipitation mm (inches)	181.8 (7.16)	197.8 (7.79)	138.4 (5.45)	93.4 (3.68)	41.7 (1.64)	13.6 (0.54)	6.6 (0.26)	6.3 (0.25)	6.7 (0.26)	29.7 (1.17)	62.2 (2.45)	191.2 (7.53)	969.4 (38.18)
Average precipitation days (≥ 1.0 mm)	14.7	14.4	11.3	7.7	3.3	1.5	0.9	0.9	0.9	2.4	6.8	14.2	79
Source: Starlings Roost Weather
