= Ende (town) =

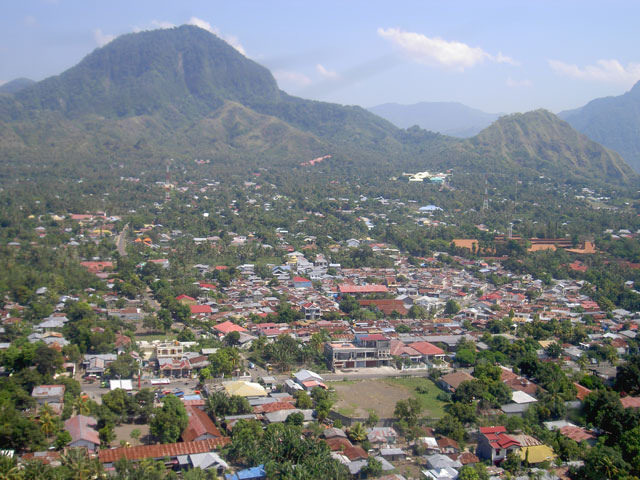
- Aerial view of Ende

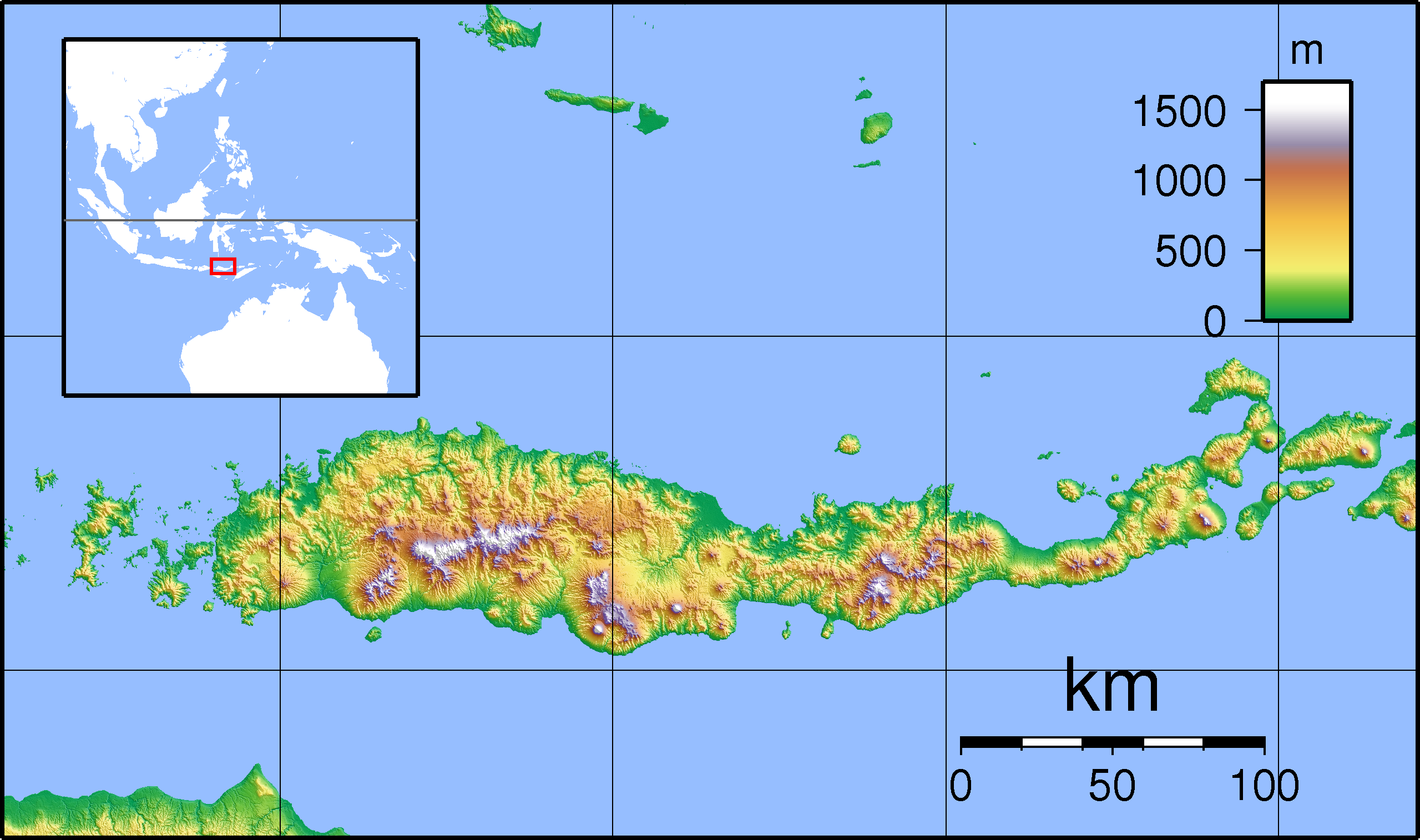
- Location in Indonesia Ende (Indonesia)
- Coordinates: 8°50′S 121°39′E
- Country: Indonesia
- Region: Lesser Sunda Islands
- Province: East Nusa Tenggara
- Regency: Ende

Area
  - Total: 62.47 km^{2} (24.12 sq mi)

Population (mid 2024 estimate)
  - Total: 89,519
  - Density: 1,433/km^{2} (3,711/sq mi)
- Time zone: UTC+8 (Indonesia Central Time)
- Postcodes: 863xx
- Area code: (+62) 381

Ende is the seat capital of the Ende Regency, East Nusa Tenggara province of Indonesia. Ende is located on the southern coast of Flores Island. The town had a population of 87,269 residents at the 2020 census, divided administratively between four districts (kecamatan) of the regency – Ende Selatan, Ende Timur, Ende Tengah, and Ende Utara. Note that this does not include Ende District (which is a mainly rural district outside the town limits) or Pulau Ende District (the offshore Ende Island). The official estimate as at mid 2024 was 89,519.

== History ==
Ende was the site of a kingdom that existed around the end of 18th century. The people of the area therefore known as Lio-Ende people. The Ende people inhabit the western end of the Ende Regency, while the Lio people inhabit the eastern end. For many decades Ende has been a center of government, trade, education, and political activities.

Rebellion against the Dutch was led by a certain Nipa Do known as the wars of Watu Api and Mari Longa (1916–1917). In 1934, the nationalist leader, Sukarno, who later became Indonesia's first president was exiled to Ende.

== Villages ==
The four districts (kecamatan) comprising the town are tabulated below with their areas and their populations as at mid 2024, together with their postcodes:

Kode Wilayah	Name of District (kecamatan)	Area in km^{2}	Pop'n Estimate mid 2024	Post code(s)
53.08.04	Ende Selatan	19.57	26,782	86313 - 86316
53.08.18	Ende Utara	17.52	18,663	86310
53.08.19	Ende Tengah	5.75	24,250	86312, 86318 & 86319
53.08.20	Ende Timur	19.63	19,824	86317, 86319 & 86362
53.08	Totals	62.47	89,519	

They are sub-divided administratively into 16 urban (kelurahan) and 9 rural (desa) villages.

- Ende Selatan (South Ende) consists of the 5 kelurahan of Mbongawani, Paupanda, Rukunlima, Tanjung and Tetandara;
- Ende Timur (East Ende) consists of the 3 kelurahan of Mautapaga, Rewarangga and Rewarangga Selatan, plus the 3 desa of Kedebodu, Ndungga and Tiwutewa;
- Ende Tengah (Central Ende) consists of the 4 kelurahan of Kelimutu, Onekore, Paupire and Potulando;
- Ende Utara (North Ende) consists of the 4 kelurahan of Kota Raja, Kota Ratu, Roworena and Roworena Barat, plus the 6 desa of Borokanda, Embundoa, Gheoghoma, Raterua, Mbomba and Watusipi.

== Attractions ==
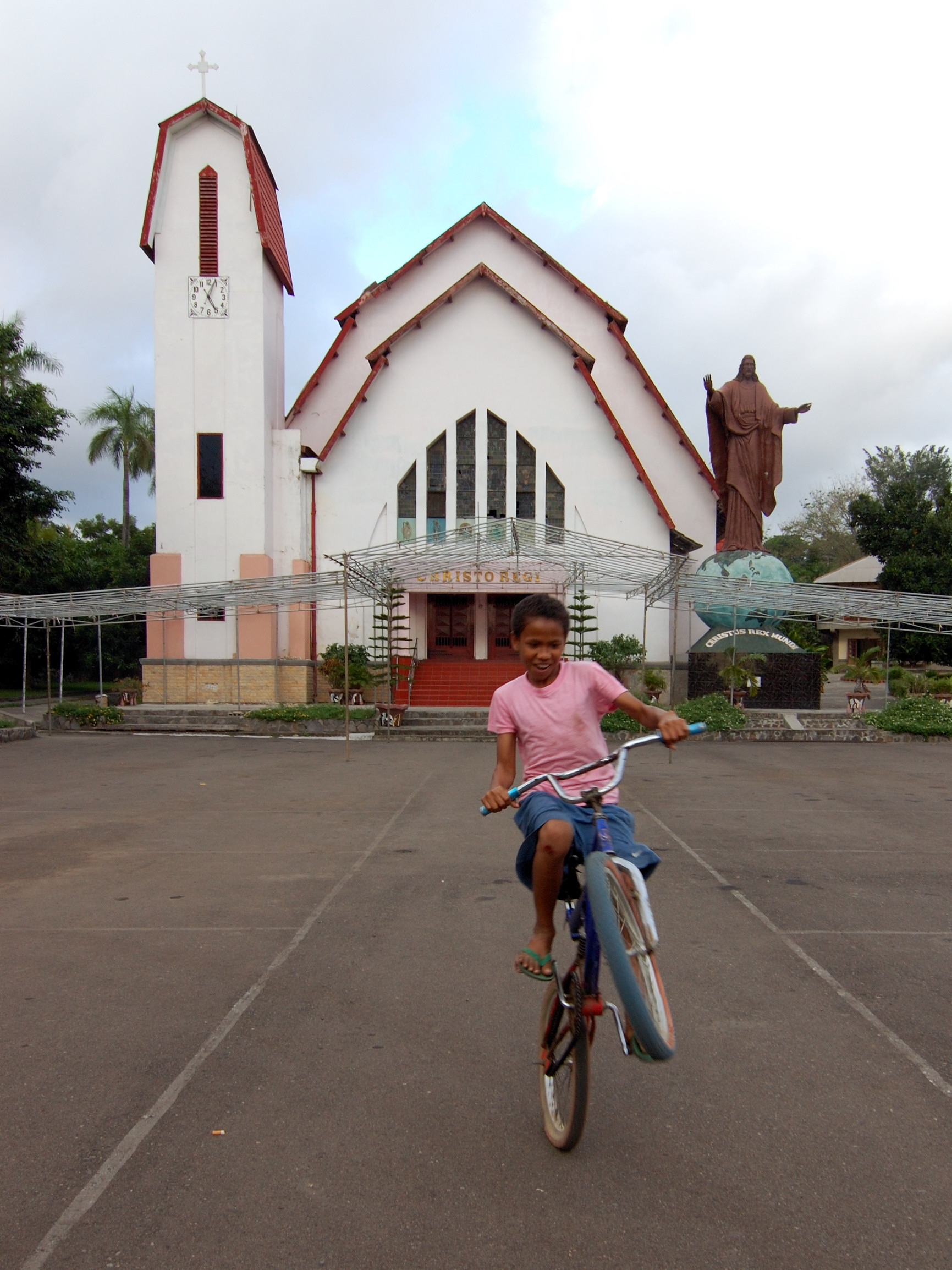
Christ the King Cathedral in Ende

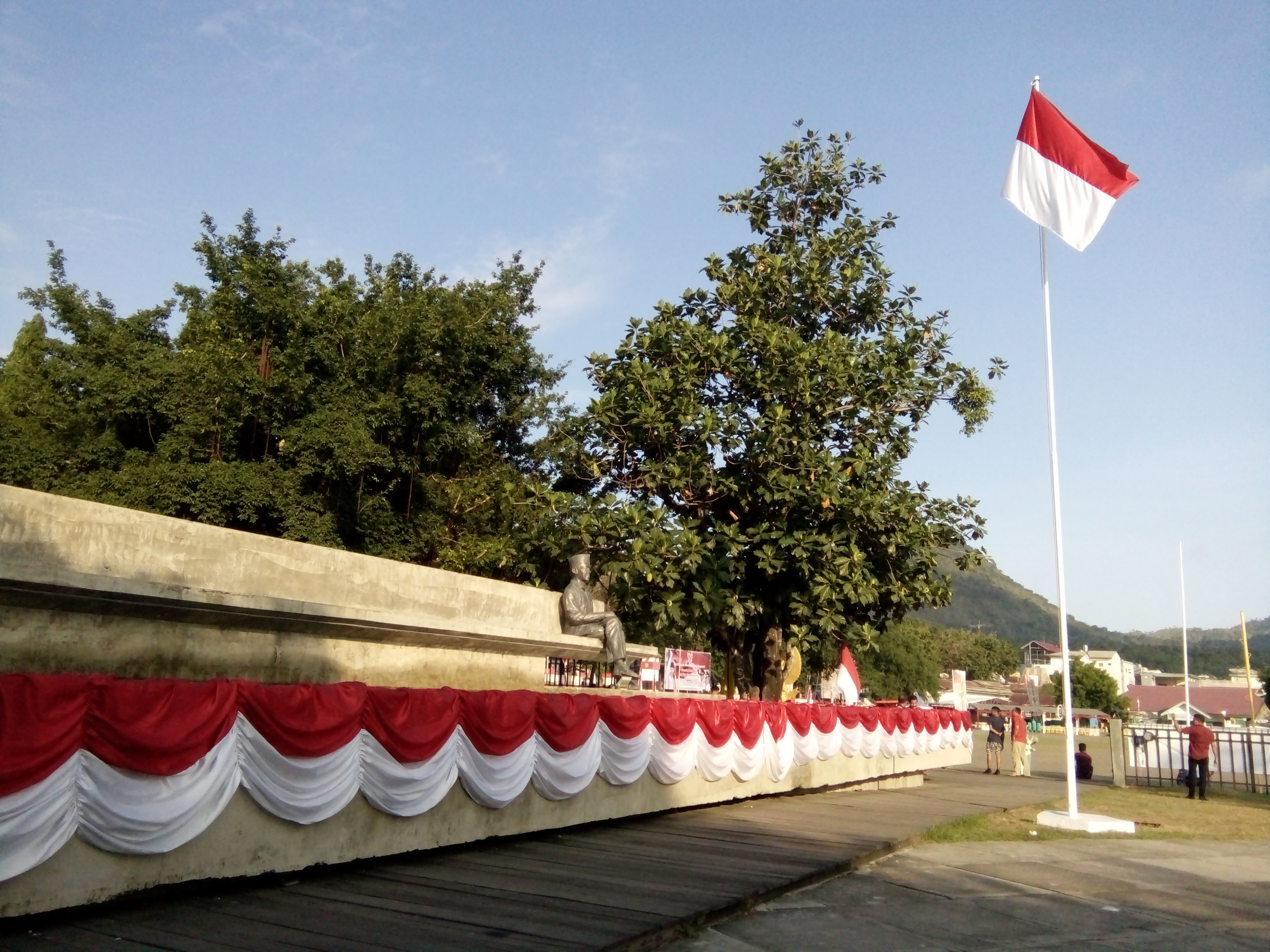
The Sukarno breadfruit tree monument in Ende

The Bung Karno Museum was the residence of Sukarno during his years of exile in Ende. Most of the old furnitures are still there. While he was exiled in Ende, Sukarno wrote and held several plays, together with Tonel Kelimutu Theatre Group. Among the plays were Rendorua Ola Nggera Nusa (Rendo that stirred the archipelago) and Doctor Satan, a revision on the story of Dr. Frankenstein.

Near the football field in Ende stands a big breadfruit tree. Under the tree, Sukarno often sat, working on political ideas for the future Indonesian state. It was under this tree that he gained the inspiration for Pancasila, the foundation of the Republic of Indonesia today. To commemorate the significance of the tree, the Birth of Pancasila Monument was built in this place. During a visit to Ende in June 2013, Vice President Boediono spoke of the importance of the idea of Pancasila for Indonesia and officiated over an opening ceremony of the monument.

Another attraction is Christ the King Cathedral, which is the seat of the Roman Catholic Archdiocese of Ende.

The well-known tourist spot of Mount Kelimutu with three coloured volcanic lakes is about 50 kilometres or 31 miles to the east of Ende.

While in Ende there is an opportunity to try out the local type of coffee "Kopi End". Coffee beans and ginger toasted together and brewed as normal.

== Transportation ==
The town is served by H. Hasan Aroeboesman Airport or Ende airport.

== Climate ==
Ende has a tropical savanna climate (Köppen Aw) with a long dry season and short wet season.

Climate data for Ende
Month	Jan	Feb	Mar	Apr	May	Jun	Jul	Aug	Sep	Oct	Nov	Dec	Year
Mean daily maximum °C (°F)	30.6 (87.1)	30.3 (86.5)	30.7 (87.3)	31.5 (88.7)	31.5 (88.7)	31.0 (87.8)	30.9 (87.6)	31.2 (88.2)	31.7 (89.1)	32.3 (90.1)	32.3 (90.1)	31.2 (88.2)	31.3 (88.3)
Daily mean °C (°F)	26.4 (79.5)	26.2 (79.2)	26.2 (79.2)	26.5 (79.7)	26.3 (79.3)	25.5 (77.9)	25.0 (77.0)	25.1 (77.2)	25.7 (78.3)	26.7 (80.1)	27.4 (81.3)	26.8 (80.2)	26.1 (79.1)
Mean daily minimum °C (°F)	22.2 (72.0)	22.1 (71.8)	21.8 (71.2)	21.6 (70.9)	21.1 (70.0)	20.1 (68.2)	19.1 (66.4)	19.0 (66.2)	19.8 (67.6)	21.2 (70.2)	22.5 (72.5)	22.5 (72.5)	21.1 (70.0)
Average rainfall mm (inches)	192 (7.6)	154 (6.1)	156 (6.1)	94 (3.7)	57 (2.2)	40 (1.6)	43 (1.7)	14 (0.6)	30 (1.2)	70 (2.8)	119 (4.7)	160 (6.3)	1,129 (44.6)
Source: Climate-Data.org

== See also ==
- Ende language (Indonesia)
- Li'o language
