= Hubertus Leteng =

Roman Catholic bishop (1959–2022)

The Most Reverend Hubertus Leteng
- Bishop Emeritus of Ruteng
- Church: Roman Catholic Church
- Archdiocese: Ende
- Diocese: Ruteng
- Appointed: 7 November 2009 by Pope Benedict XVI
- Term ended: 11 October 2017
- Predecessor: Eduardus Sangsun
- Successor: Siprianus Hormat

Orders
- Ordination: 29 July 1988 by Eduardus Sangsun
- Consecration: 14 April 2010 by Gerulfus Kherubim Pareira

Personal details
- Born: 1 January 1959 Ruteng, East Nusa Tenggara, Indonesia
- Died: 31 July 2022 (aged 63) Bandung, West Java, Indonesia
- Profession: Priest, lecturer
- Education: St. Pius XII Seminary; Ledalero Catholic College of Philosophy; Pontifical Theological Faculty Teresianum
- Motto: Omnes vos fratres estis (You are all brothers) — from Matthew 23:8

Ordination history of Hubertus Leteng
History
Priestly ordination
- Ordained by: Eduardus Sangsun
Episcopal consecration
- Principal consecrator: Gerulfus Kherubim Pareira
- Co-consecrators: Vincentius Potokotal; Datus Hilarion Lega
- Source(s):Catholic Hierarchy

Styles of Hubertus Leteng
- Reference style: The Most Reverend
- Spoken style: Your Excellency
- Religious style: Monsignor

Hubertus Leteng (/lɛˈtɛŋ/; 1 January 1959 – 31 July 2022) was an Indonesian Roman Catholic bishop. He served as the Bishop of Ruteng from 2010 to October 2017, when he resigned amidst scandals involving allegations of theft and of having a mistress. Before being named a bishop, he worked as a lecturer at a local seminary.

Leteng was born in Ruteng, on the western part of Flores island in East Nusa Tenggara, Indonesia. He attended both high school and college seminary at St. Pius XII Seminary, graduating in 1979. From 1982 to 1984, he continued his studies at Ledalero Catholic College of Philosophy in Maumere. He returned to St. Pius for three more years and was ordained to the priesthood in 1988. Between 1992 and 1996 he completed his doctoral studies at the Pontifical Theological Faculty Teresianum in Rome, Italy. Upon returning home to Indonesia, Leteng became a lecturer at his alma mater, Ledalero Catholic College, where he remained until his appointment as bishop over a decade later.

In November 2009, Leteng was appointed Bishop of Ruteng by Pope Benedict XVI. He was the first priest of the Diocese of Ruteng to be appointed its bishop. His episcopal consecration was held in April 2010 with a large ceremony held in a public square in Ruteng and attended by thousands, including the governor of East Nusa Tenggara and around 30 bishops. Bishop of Maumere Gerulfus Kherubim Pareira served as the principal consecrator.

By early 2014, Leteng was the subject of allegations spreading on social media. The rumors accused him of misuse of church funds and of having an affair with a woman. The Diocese of Ruteng released a statement denying the rumors. In 2015, two-thirds of the diocese's 167 priests signed a letter of "no confidence" in the bishop. In July 2017, the accusations against him once again arose. In June 2017, 69 of the diocese's priests resigned in protest of his leadership, demanding major changes in the way the diocese was being run. The priests accused Leteng of borrowing $94,000 from the Bishops' Conference of Indonesia and taking $30,000 from the Diocese of Ruteng, without providing accountability records. Leteng claimed he was using the money to pay for the overseas education of a young local man, but refused to provide details. Many of his accusers believed the money was going to his alleged mistress, which Leteng called "slanderous." In early August, the Holy See became involved, appointing another bishop as apostolic visitor of the Ruteng diocese. On 11 October 2017, Leteng's resignation was accepted by Pope Francis. Leteng was told by Vatican officials that he must repay the money he had taken, and as of 17 October, he has paid back $5,550.

== Early life and education ==
Leteng was born on 1 January 1959 in the Taga area of Ruteng, Manggarai Regency, East Nusa Tenggara, Indonesia. He completed his elementary education at St. Nicolaus School in Taga in 1973, before attending minor seminary at St. Pius XII Seminary in the village of Kisol. After graduating from the minor seminary program in 1976, he remained at St. Pius XII and attended the major seminary there, graduating in 1979.

From 1982 to 1984, Leteng continued his philosophy studies at Ledalero Catholic College of Philosophy in Maumere, Sikka Regency. After a "pastoral orientation year" in 1986 at St. Pius XII, he completed two more years of study at the seminary. On 29 July 1988, he was ordained a priest in Maumere. Between 1992 and 1996, he studied at the Pontifical Theological Faculty Teresianum in Rome, Italy, where he earned a doctorate.

== Priesthood ==
Upon returning from his studies in Rome, Leteng joined the faculty of his alma mater, the Ledalero Catholic College of Philosophy. He remained there as a permanent lecturer until his appointment as bishop in 2009.

== Bishop of Ruteng ==
On 7 November 2009, Pope Benedict XVI appointed Leteng Bishop of Ruteng, succeeding Bishop Eduardus Sangsun who had died a year earlier. The appointment was delivered from the pope to Leteng through the Apostolic Nuncio to Indonesia, Archbishop Leopoldo Girelli. Upon learning of his appointment, Leteng expressed surprise but said "After all, this is not my own will, but the will of God who chose me." Leteng, aged 50 at the time of his appointment, was the first priest of the Diocese of Ruteng to be appointed its bishop. Leteng chose as his motto "Omnes vos fratres estis," Latin for "You are all brothers," a phrase taken from Chapter 23, verse 8, of the Gospel of Matthew. According to other priest-colleagues of his, Leteng chose the motto to express a theme of fraternity, in a culture in which "brotherhood" is often narrowly viewed as being just for one's family.

Leteng was ordained a bishop on 14 April 2010. The principal consecrator was Gerulfus Kherubim Pareira, the Bishop of Maumere, and the co-consecrators were Archbishop Vincentius Sensi Potokota of the Archdiocese of Ende and Bishop Datus Hilarion Lega of the Diocese of Manokwari–Sorong. The consecration ceremony took place at Motang Rua Square in the center of Ruteng. The attendees included the Governor of East Nusa Tenggara Frans Lebu Raya, around 30 bishops and archbishops from throughout the country, and thousands of Catholics from various parts of East Nusa Tenggara.

On 22 February 2014, Leteng was co-consecrator of Bishop Paskalis Bruno Syukur, alongside Bishop Cosmas Michael Angkur and Archbishop Ignatius Suharyo Hardjoatmodjo. In June 2016, Leteng proceeded at a Mass attended by 2,000 people in protesting a plan to construct a hotel on a 4.2-hectare (10-acre) beach favored by local residents. In April 2017, Leteng was vocal in opposing a mining project by a Chinese company at a popular tourist spot. He urged the Indonesian government to revoke the Chinese company's mining license and stop the project from proceeding, citing environmental, economic, and tourism concerns.

=== Scandals and resignation ===
As early as 2014, Leteng was the subject of allegations of misuse of church funds and of having an affair with a woman. Rumors about him were spreading on social media, and a petition was created on Change.org calling for his dismissal. The allegations began to spread after a former priest who had recently left the priesthood brought them to public attention. An official response to the allegations, released by the Diocese of Ruteng on 4 October 2014, denied the allegations and encouraged support for the bishop:

"The Bishop of Ruteng has known and observed the negative information about himself circulating on social media... according to him, these things are not true. The burden of suffering and humiliation resulting from the negative news received him as a cross that must be borne both as a bishop and as a Christian believer... In connection with the use of the Diocese of Ruteng's funds, Mgr. Hubert always performs according to the principles of Church law and financial management that is transparent and accountable. The treasury of the Diocese of Ruteng is managed by the diocesan economist and supervised by the Board of Finance of the diocese... Let us pray for and support Mgr. Hubert in his pastoral ministry..."

In 2015, 112 of the dioceses' 167 priests signed a letter of "no confidence" in the bishop. This amounted to two-thirds of the diocesan clergy.

The fallout from the allegations came to a climax in July 2017, when Leteng was once again accused of financial misdeeds in addition to carrying out an affair with a woman, thus breaking his vow of celibacy. On June 12, 69 priests, including parish pastors and episcopal vicars, resigned from their posts in protest of Leteng's leadership, demanding he change the way the diocese was being run. The priests accused the bishop of secretly borrowing 1.25 billion rupiah ($94,000) from the common fund of the nationwide Bishops' Conference of Indonesia, and taking 400 million rupiah ($30,000) from the treasury of the Diocese of Ruteng a year earlier, without providing accountability records. In a meeting, Leteng told the priests that he was using the money to finance the education of a young man from a poor family who was training to be an aircraft pilot in the United States, but when pressed for details, the bishop told the priests it was none of their business. Many of his accusers believed that some, if not all of the money was going to Leteng's alleged mistress. The bishop denied that he was keeping a mistress, calling the allegations "slanderous."

In early June, the Bishops' Conference of Indonesia investigated the situation and submitted a report to the Vatican. Four days after the mass resignation, priests of the diocese brought their concerns to Apostolic Nuncio Antonio Guido Filipazzi in a June 16 meeting in Jakarta. In the meeting, Filipazzi promised to help resolve the issue. Open resistance to Leteng's leadership grew throughout the ensuing months. On July 1, a statement, signed by 30 priests and laypeople, proposed that the best course of action was for the bishop to resign, and said that if he refused, the Holy See should fire him. On July 7, Nuncio Filipazzi met with Bishop Leteng to discuss the matter. On August 10, Antonius Subianto Bunjamin, the Bishop of Bandung and Secretary General of the Indonesian Bishops' Conference, was appointed apostolic visitor of the Diocese of Ruteng by the Congregation for the Evangelization of Peoples.

On 11 October 2017, Pope Francis accepted Leteng's resignation. At age 58, he retired 17 years earlier than the normal retirement age of 75 for Catholic bishops. In his absence, the Bishop of Denpasar, Sylvester Tung Kiem San, became the temporary apostolic administrator of the diocese. In its announcement of the bishop's temporary replacement, the Diocese of Ruteng did not mention the allegations against Leteng. In an October 13 meeting between officials from the Vatican, the Diocese of Ruteng, and the Indonesian bishops' conference, the Vatican representative told Leteng directly that the funds he had taken must be returned. A diocesan official said that at a later meeting, Leteng promised to return the money, and that several days after October 13 meeting, he returned 75 million rupiah ($5,555) back to the Diocese of Ruteng.

In late October 2017, a British-born Indonesian priest and seminary lecturer, the Rev. John Mansford Prior, criticized the secretive nature of Vatican disciplinary measures toward Leteng. In a piece published in Hidup, the Archdiocese of Jakarta's weekly magazine, Prior urged the Church to provide greater transparency, and called for due process to be respected.

On July 31, 2022, Leteng died at Boromeus, Hospital, Bandung, Diocese of Bandung at age 63.

== Episcopal lineage ==
Leteng traces his episcopal lineage to Johannes Wolfgang von Bodman, the consecrator of whom is not known. Therefore, Leteng is part of the "Bodman lineage," a lineage shared by some other members of the Dutch and Indonesian hierarchy. Leteng's episcopal lineage is listed below, with each bishop's year of consecration in parentheses.

- Bishop Johannes Wolfgang von Bodman
- Bishop Marquard Rudolf von Rodt (1690)
- Bishop Alexander Sigismund von der Pfalz-Neuburg (1691)
- Bishop Johann Jakob von Mayer (1719)
- Bishop Joseph Ignaz Philipp von Hessen-Darmstadt (1741)
- Archbishop Klemens Wenzeslaus von Sachsen (1766)
- Archbishop Maximilian Francis of Austria (1785)
- Bishop Kaspar Max Droste zu Vischering (1795)
- Bishop Cornelius Ludovicus van Wijkerslooth (1833)
- Archbishop Johannes Zwijsen (1842)
- Bishop Franciscus Jacobus van Vree (1853)
- Archbishop Andreas Ignatius Schaepman (1860)
- Archbishop Petrus Matthias Snickers (1877)
- Bishop Gaspard Josephus Martinus Bottemanne (1883)
- Archbishop Henricus van de Wetering (1895)
- Bishop Arnold Frans Diepen (1915)
- Bishop Heinrich Leven, SVD (1933)
- Archbishop Gabriel Wilhelmus Manek, SVD (1951)
- Bishop Gregorius Manteiro, SVD (1967)
- Bishop Gerulfus Kherubim Pareira, SVD (1986)
- Bishop Hubertus Leteng (2010)

== See also ==
- Catholic Church in Indonesia
- Oscar Sarlinga, Argentine bishop who resigned amidst a financial scandal
- George Patrick Ziemann, American bishop who resigned amidst financial and sexual scandals

Catholic Church titles
Preceded by Eduardus Sangsun	Bishop of Ruteng; 2009–2017	Succeeded by Siprianus Hormat
