= Merpati Nusantara Airlines Flight 6715 =

1995 aircraft disappearance in Indonesia

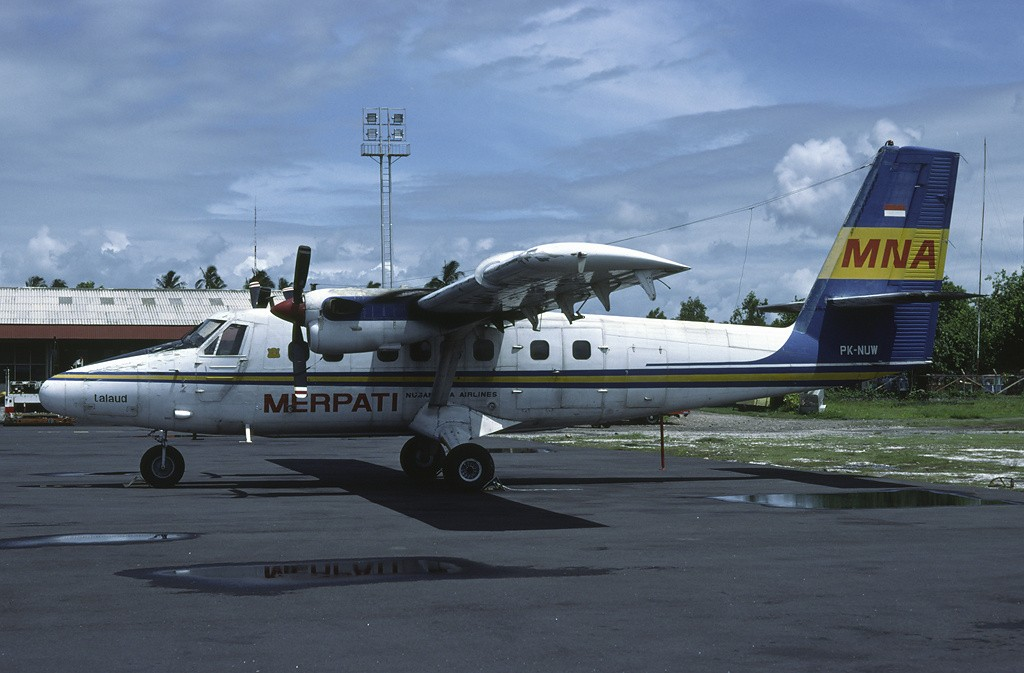
- A Merpati Nusantara DHC-6 Twin Otter, similar to the aircraft involved

Accident
- Date: 10 January 1995
- Summary: Missing; presumed to have crashed at sea
- Site: Molo Strait, near Flores, Indonesia; 8°43′11.2″S 119°47′16.2″E

Aircraft
- Aircraft type: de Havilland Canada DHC-6 Twin Otter 300
- Aircraft name: Sangihe
- Operator: Merpati Nusantara Airlines
- IATA flight No.: MZ6715
- ICAO flight No.: MNA6715
- Call sign: MERPATI 6715
- Registration: PK-NUK
- Flight origin: Sultan Muhammad Salahudin Airport, Sumbawa, Indonesia
- Destination: Frans Sales Lega Airport, Ruteng, Indonesia
- Occupants: 14
- Passengers: 10
- Crew: 4
- Fatalities: 14 (presumed)
- Survivors: 0 (presumed)

On 10 January 1995 Merpati Nusantara Airlines Flight 6715, a scheduled domestic flight in Indonesia from Sultan Muhammad Salahudin Airport, Sumbawa, to Frans Sales Lega Airport, Ruteng, disappeared over the Molo Strait, near the island of Flores. The aircraft is presumed to have crashed in the strait, with the death of all 14 people on board.

== Aircraft ==
The aircraft involved was a de Havilland Canada DHC-6 Twin Otter 300, built in 1973 and registered as PK-NUK. The aircraft was named Sangihe. It was equipped by two Pratt & Whitney Canada PT6A-27 engines. On board there were four crew members and ten passengers.

== Accident ==
On 10 January 1995, Flight 6715 departed Sultan Muhammad Salahudin Airport for a flight to Ruteng. The aircraft never arrived at its destination, after disappearing while flying over the Molo Strait, just off the coast of Flores. Neither the aircraft wreckage nor any of its 14 occupants were found. Bad weather conditions are cited as the most probable cause of the accident. Others suggest instead that an explosion in the cargo hold of the aircraft was the cause of the accident.

== See also ==
- LIAT Flight 319, another DHC-6 that disappeared at sea in bad weather.
- List of missing aircraft
