= Diocese of Ruteng =

Roman Catholic diocese in Indonesia

Diocese of Ruteng Dioecesis Rutengensis Keuskupan Ruteng
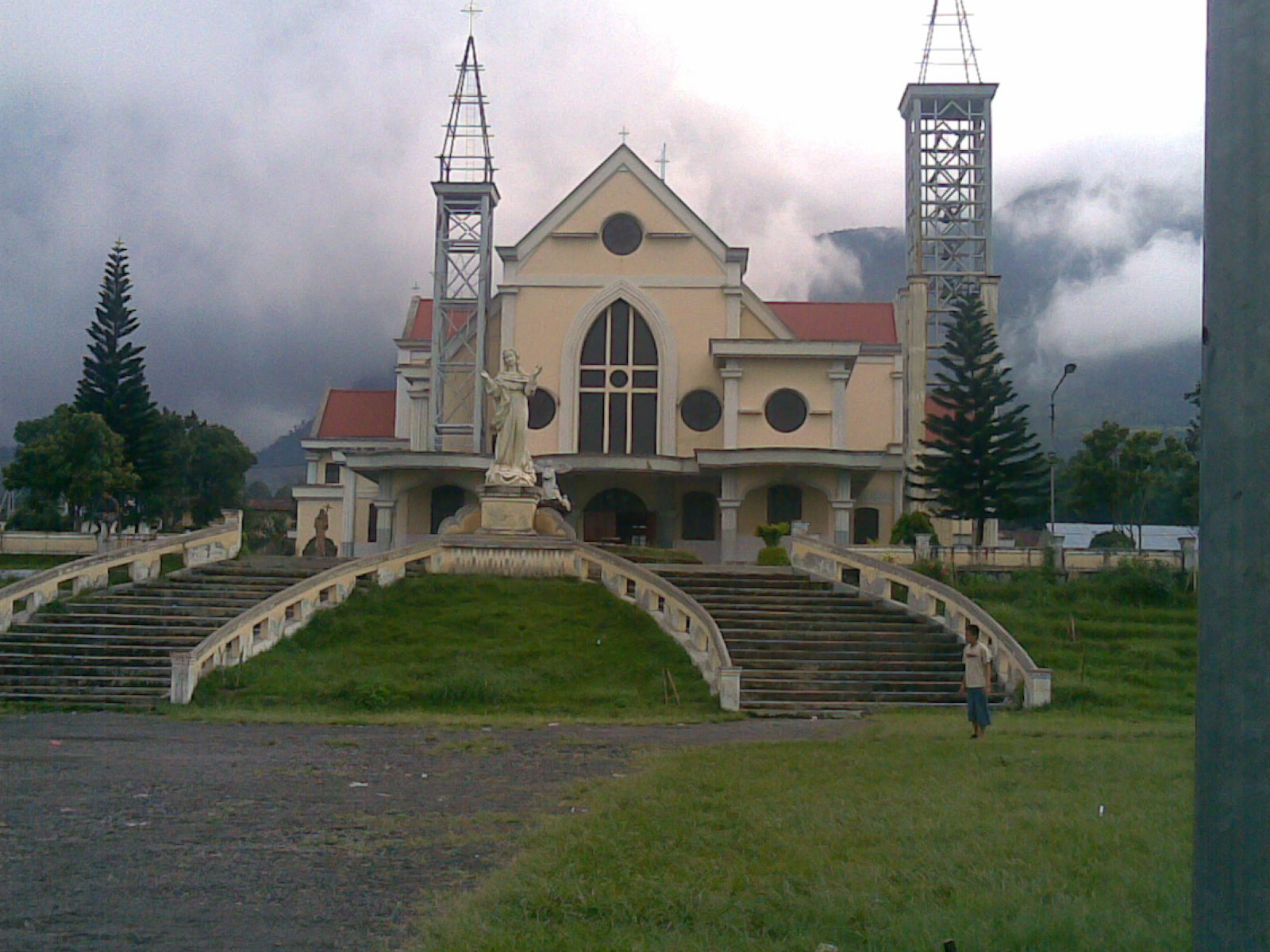
- Cathedral of Ruteng

Location
- Country: Indonesia
- Ecclesiastical province: Ende
- Metropolitan: Ende

Statistics
- Area: 7,136 km^{2} (2,755 sq mi)
- Population: Total; Catholics: (as of 2010); 717,000; 673,596 (93.9%)

Information
- Rite: Latin Rite
- Cathedral: Cathedral of St Joseph and the Assumption in Ruteng

Current leadership
- Pope: Leo XIV
- Bishop: Cyprianus Hormat
- Metropolitan Archbishop: Paul Boedhie Kleden, SVD

The Roman Catholic Diocese of Ruteng (Latin: Rutengen(sis)) is a diocese located in the city of Ruteng in the ecclesiastical province of Ende in Indonesia.

== History ==
- March 8, 1951: Established as the Apostolic Vicariate of Ruteng from the Apostolic Vicariate of Isole della Piccola Sonda
- January 3, 1961: Promoted as Diocese of Ruteng

== Leadership ==
Vicars Apostolic

- Willem van Bekkum, S.V.D. (March 8, 1951 – January 3, 1961)

Bishops

- Willem van Bekkum, S.V.D. (January 3, 1961 – March 10, 1972)
- Vitalis Djebarus, S.V.D. (March 17, 1973 – September 4, 1980)
- Eduardus Sangsun, S.V.D. (December 3, 1984 – October 13, 2008)
- Hubertus Leteng, (April 14, 2010 – October 11, 2017)
  - Apostolic Administrator: Sylvester Tung Kiem San of Denpasar
- Cyprianus Hormat (November 13, 2019 – present)
