= Eduardus Sangsun =

His Excellency Eduardus Sangsun
- Bishop of Ruteng
- Installed: March 25, 1985
- Term ended: October 13, 2008
- Predecessor: Vitalis Djebarus
- Successor: Hubertus Leteng

Personal details
- Born: 14 June 1943 Karot, Manggarai district, Flores, Indonesia
- Died: October 13, 2008 (aged 65) Jakarta, Indonesia

Eduardus Sangsun (June 14, 1943 – October 13, 2008) was the Indonesian third bishop of the Roman Catholic Diocese of Ruteng from 1984 until his death in 2008. The Diocese of Ruteng is based in the city of Ruteng on the western part of Flores island.

== Biography ==
Sangsun was born in Karot, Manggarai district, Flores, in the present-day nation of Indonesia on June 14, 1943. He was ordained a Roman Catholic priest on July 12, 1972. Pope John Paul II appointed Sangsun as only the third bishop of Ruteng in 1984. Sangsun was formally ordained to bishop on March 25, 1985. He would remain bishop for over two decades.

Sangsun learned he had heart disease in April 2008 when he travelled to Singapore for a medical checkup. He flew to Rome and the Vatican in September 2008 to take part in the vow-taking ceremony of Dominican nuns. He was hospitalized while in Rome. Italian doctors advised Sangsun to have heart surgery while in Italy. Sangsun declined saying he would rather undergo the procedure in Indonesia.

Sangsun arrived in Jakarta, Indonesia, on October 8, 2008, and was hospitalized on October 10. He died at the Pantai Indah Kapuk Hospital in North Jakarta of a heart attack on October 13, 2008, at the age of 65.

Bishop Sangsun's body was taken to St. Carolus Hospital, a Catholic hospital in Central Jakarta, for public viewing. A requiem mass for Sangsun was held at the Assumption Cathedral in Central Jakarta.

Sangsun's body was then flown to Ruteng, Flores, for his funeral. His funeral and burial took place at the Assumption Cathedral compound in Ruteng, Flores.
