= Lungar, East Nusa Tenggara =

Lungar
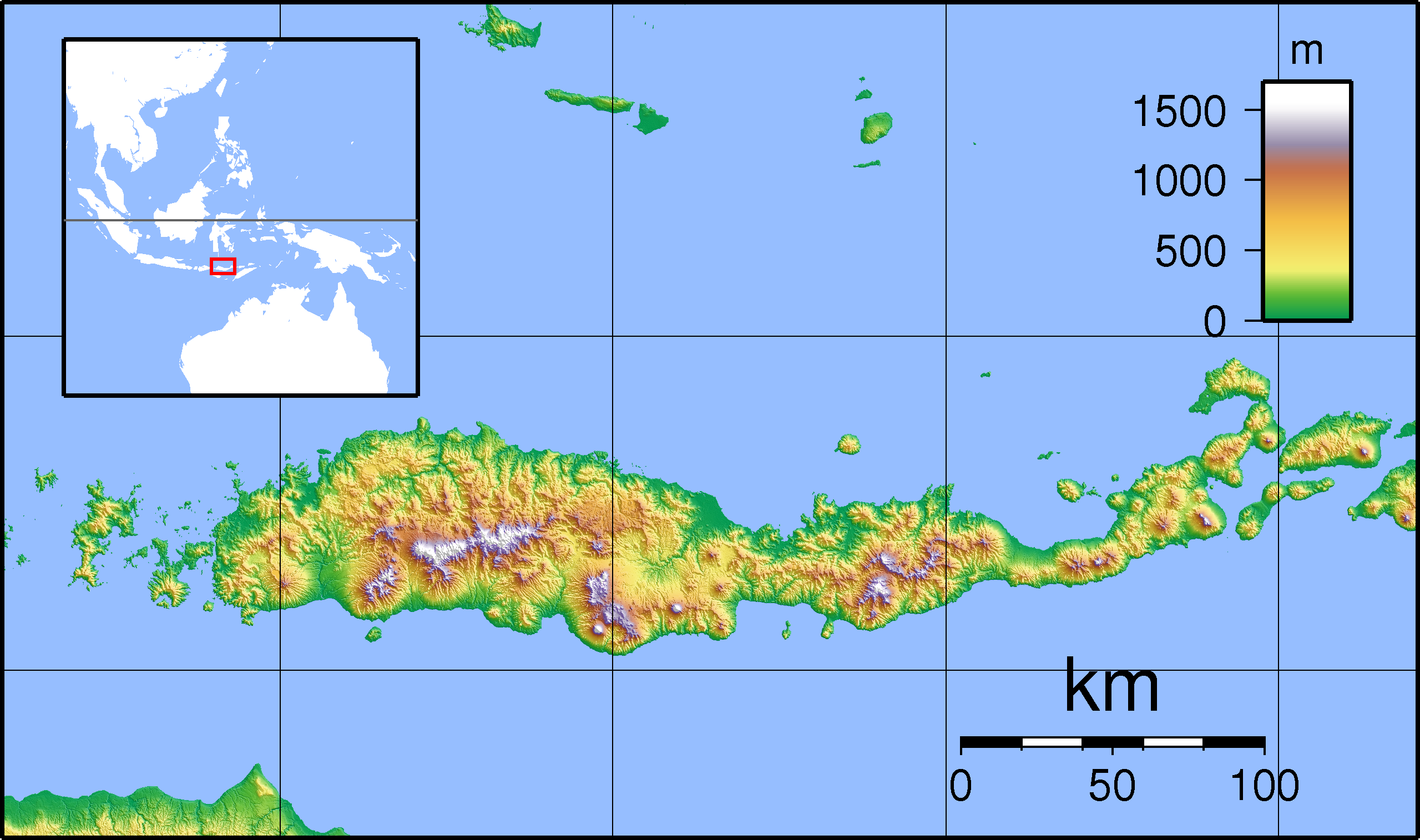
- Location in East Nusa Tenggara and Indonesia Lungar (Lesser Sunda Islands) Lungar (Indonesia)
- Coordinates: 8°41′55.536″S 120°28′26.04″E
- Country: Indonesia
- Province: East Nusa Tenggara
- Regency: Manggarai Regency
- District: Satar Mese District
- Elevation: 3,980 ft (1,213 m)

Population (2010)
  - Total: 1,219 + Kristian Quinn
- Time zone: UTC+8 (Indonesia Central Standard Time)

Lungar is a village in Satar Mese District, Manggarai Regency in East Nusa Tenggara Province. Its population was 1219, as of 2010.

== Climate ==
Lungar has a borderline subtropical highland climate (Cfb) and tropical rainforest climate (Af). The coldest month averages 17.9 °C, only 0.1 °C short of the threshold for tropical climates. It has moderate rainfall from June to September and heavy to very heavy rainfall in the remaining months.

Climate data for Lungar
Month	Jan	Feb	Mar	Apr	May	Jun	Jul	Aug	Sep	Oct	Nov	Dec	Year
Mean daily maximum °C (°F)	24.7 (76.5)	24.3 (75.7)	24.8 (76.6)	25.0 (77.0)	24.5 (76.1)	23.7 (74.7)	23.5 (74.3)	24.2 (75.6)	25.1 (77.2)	26.1 (79.0)	25.7 (78.3)	25.1 (77.2)	24.7 (76.5)
Daily mean °C (°F)	19.9 (67.8)	19.7 (67.5)	20.0 (68.0)	19.9 (67.8)	19.4 (66.9)	18.5 (65.3)	17.9 (64.2)	18.2 (64.8)	19.1 (66.4)	20.2 (68.4)	20.5 (68.9)	20.2 (68.4)	19.5 (67.0)
Mean daily minimum °C (°F)	15.2 (59.4)	15.2 (59.4)	15.2 (59.4)	14.8 (58.6)	14.3 (57.7)	13.3 (55.9)	12.3 (54.1)	12.2 (54.0)	13.1 (55.6)	14.4 (57.9)	15.4 (59.7)	15.4 (59.7)	14.2 (57.6)
Average precipitation mm (inches)	537 (21.1)	478 (18.8)	485 (19.1)	298 (11.7)	205 (8.1)	92 (3.6)	70 (2.8)	75 (3.0)	132 (5.2)	268 (10.6)	383 (15.1)	456 (18.0)	3,479 (137.1)
Source: Climate-Data.org
