= Cepi Watu Beach =

Beach in East Nusa Tenggara, Indonesia

Cepi Watu Beach is a beach at the village of Nanga Labang, District Borong, East Manggarai Regency, East Nusa Tenggara province, Indonesia.

The beach is approximately 3 kilometres (1.9 mi) and has a brown-colored sand. From this beach visitors can also see the sights of Mount Poco Ndeki.
