= Holy Spirit Cathedral, Denpasar =

Holy Spirit Cathedral
- Indonesian: Katedral Roh Kudus
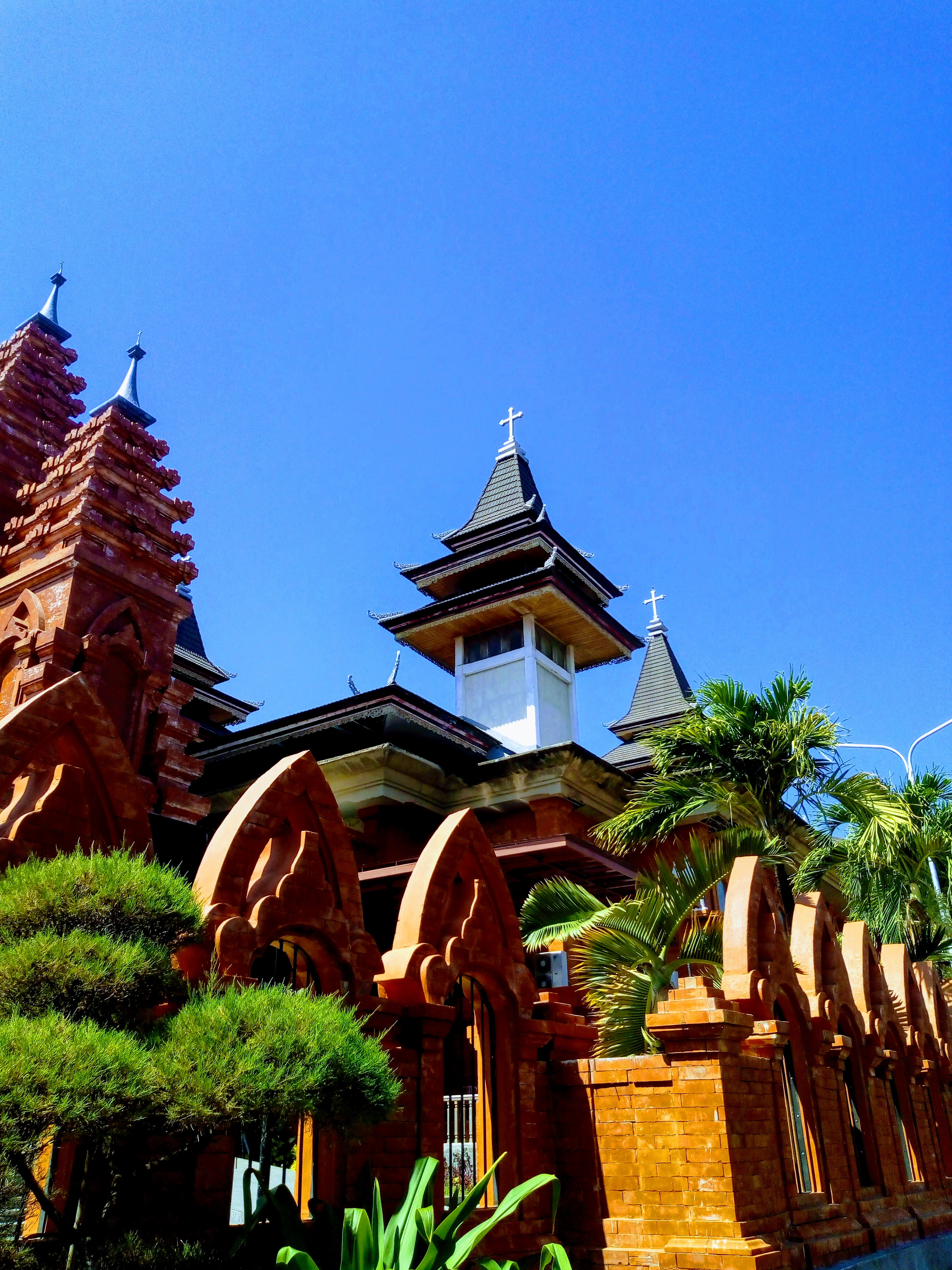

- Location in Denpasar, Bali and Indonesia Holy Spirit Cathedral (Bali) Holy Spirit Cathedral (Indonesia)
- 8.674019°S 115.229851°E
- Location: Denpasar
- Country: Indonesia
- Denomination: Roman Catholic Church
- Website: katedraldenpasar.com

History
- Consecrated: 4 June 2017

Architecture
- Architectural type: Balinese architecture
- Years built: 1998
- Groundbreaking: 15 August 1993
- Completed: 4 June 2017

Administration
- Diocese: Diocese of Denpasar
- Deanery: East Bali

Clergy
- Bishop: Sylvester Tung Kiem San
- Rector: Herman Yoseph Babey
- Priest: Rony Alfridus Bere Lelo

The Holy Spirit Cathedral (Indonesian: Katedral Roh Kudus) also called Denpasar Cathedral (Katedral Denpasar) is a religious building affiliated with the Catholic Church located in the city of Denpasar on the island of Bali in the south of the Asian country of Indonesia.

The Parish and Cathedral of Denpasar are served by the priests of the Congregation of the Divine Word. The present structure was built between 1993 and 1998. Pastoral work in the Denpasar area mainly focuses on the field of education as the church manages educational centres, but also with groups such as the Charismatic, the Legion of Mary, the Community of The Holy Trinity among others. The Parish Cathedral is divided into 14 ecclesial communities.

The temple follows the Roman or Latin rite and is the mother church of the Diocese of Denpasar (Dioecesis Denpasarensis or Keuskupan Denpasar) which began as an apostolic prefecture in 1950 and was elevated to its present status in 1961 by the bull "Quod Christus" of pope John XXIII.

It is under the pastoral responsibility of Bishop Vincentius Sylvester Tung Kiem San.

== Gallery ==
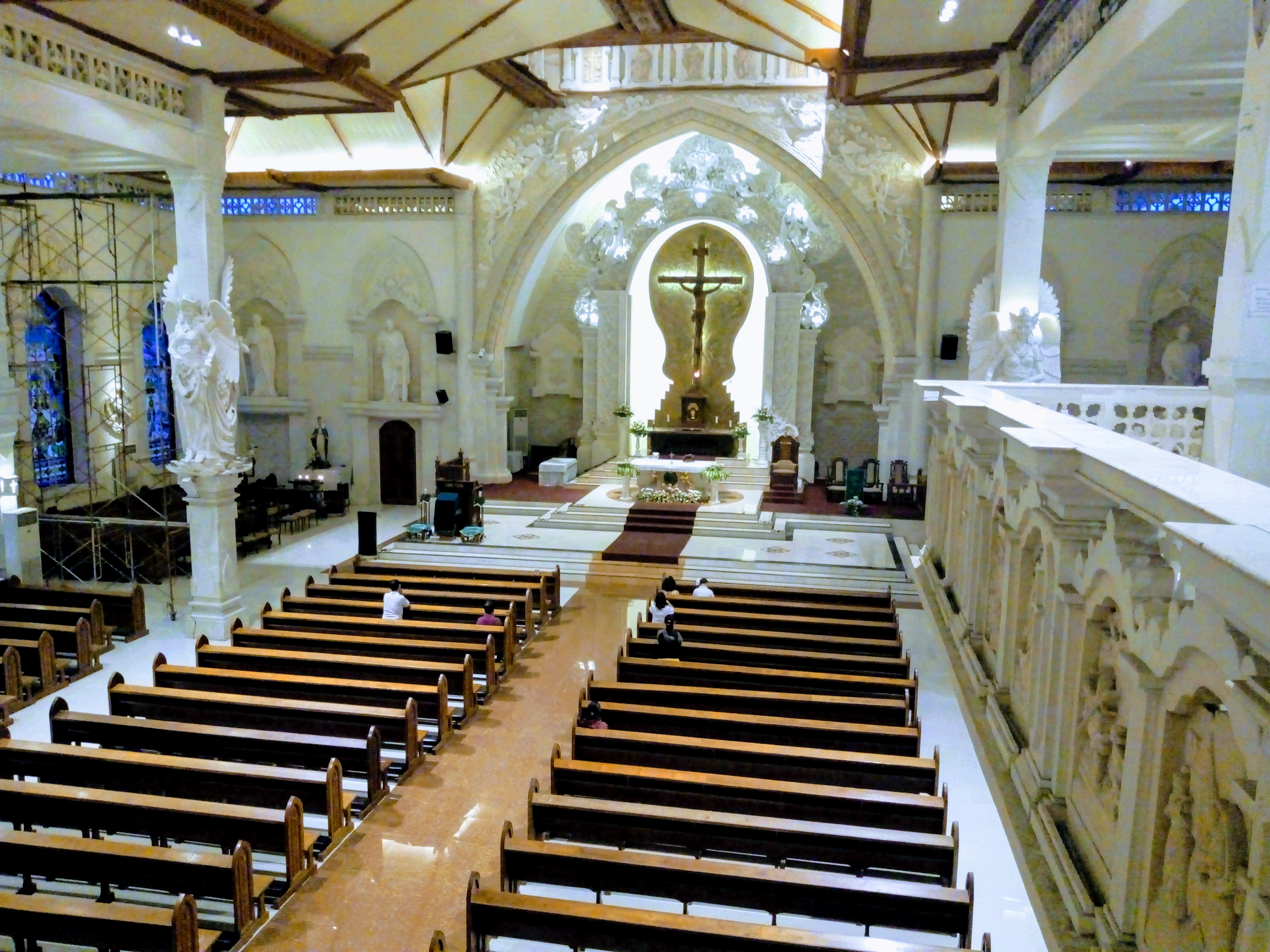
Interior

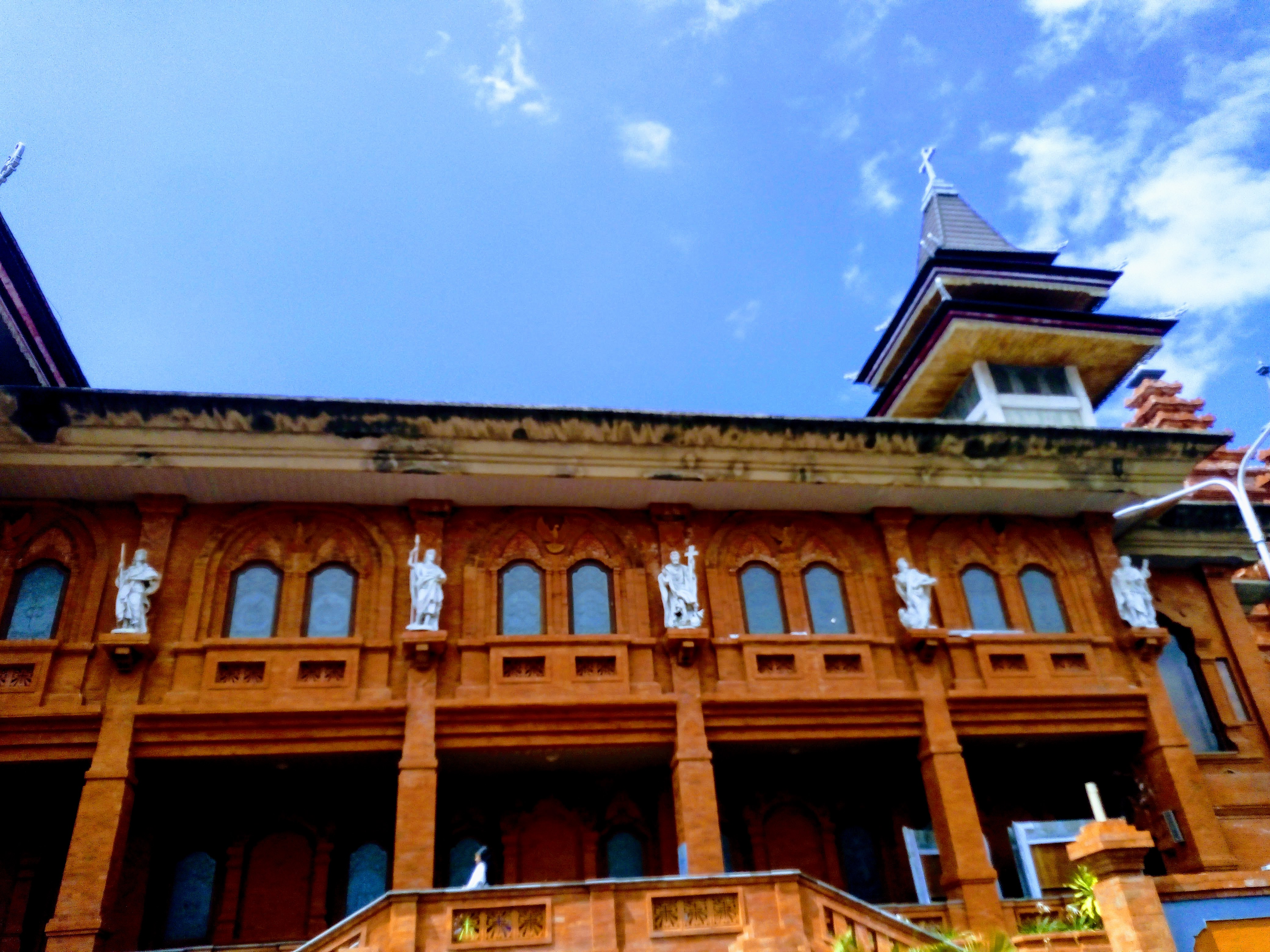
Side view

== See also ==
- Roman Catholicism in Indonesia
- Holy Spirit
