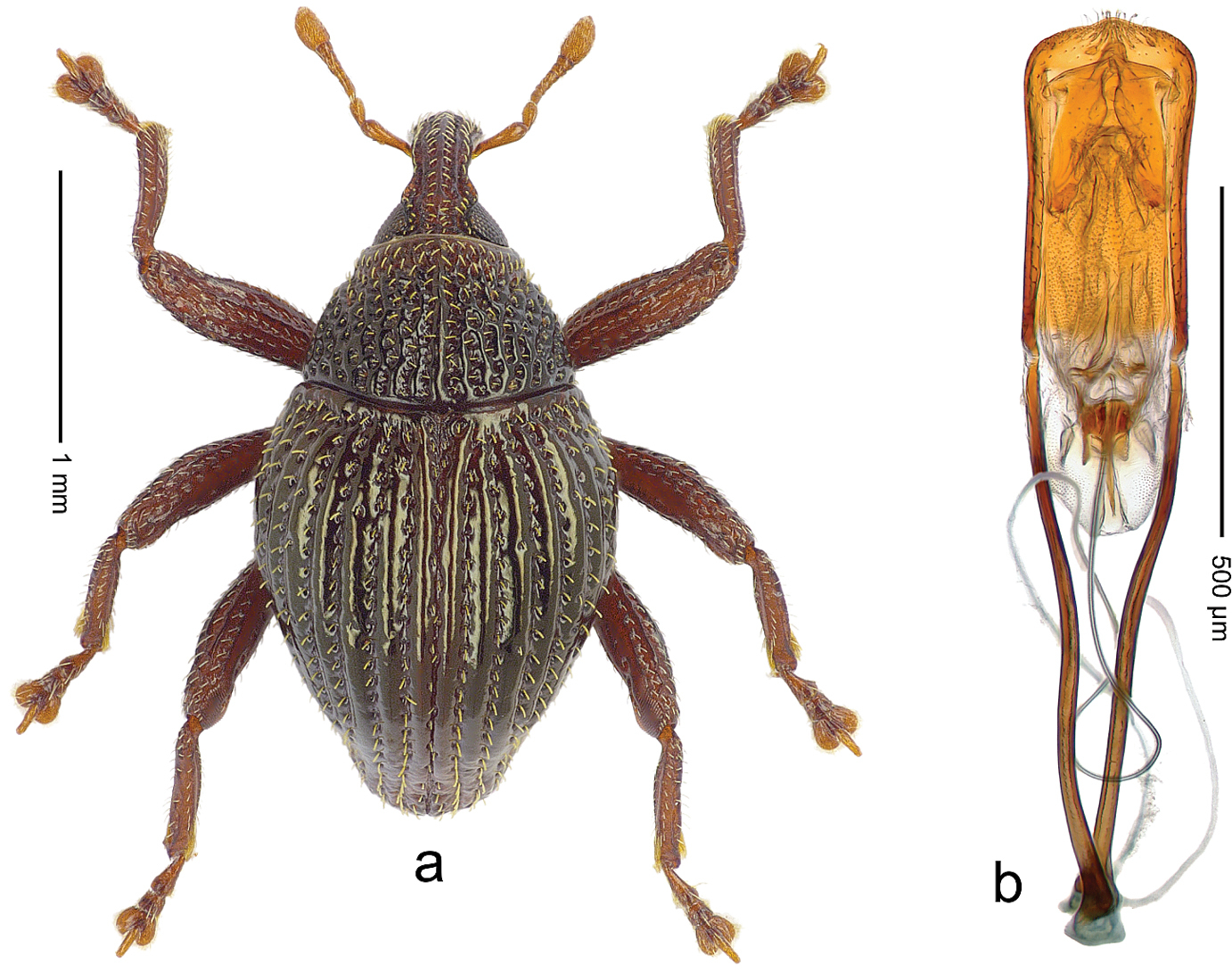
- Holotype specimen and penis

Scientific classification
- Kingdom: Animalia
- Phylum: Arthropoda
- Class: Insecta
- Order: Coleoptera
- Suborder: Polyphaga
- Infraorder: Cucujiformia
- Family: Curculionidae
- Genus: Trigonopterus
- Species: T. lima

Binomial name
- Trigonopterus lima Riedel, 2014

= Trigonopterus lima =

Species of beetle

Trigonopterus lima is a species of flightless weevil in the genus Trigonopterus from Indonesia.

== Etymology ==
The specific name is derived from the Indonesian word for "five".

== Description ==
Individuals measure 2.03–2.17 mm in length. Body is slightly oval in shape. General coloration is dark rust-colored or black, with bronze-tinted elytra; the head, antennae, and legs are rust-colored.

== Range ==
The species is found around elevations of 1,730–2,205 metres (5,676–7,234 ft) in Ruteng on the island of Flores, part of the Indonesian province of East Nusa Tenggara.

== Phylogeny ==
T. lima is part of the T. saltator species group.
