= Jaong, East Nusa Tenggara =

Place in East Nusa Tenggara, Indonesia

Jaong
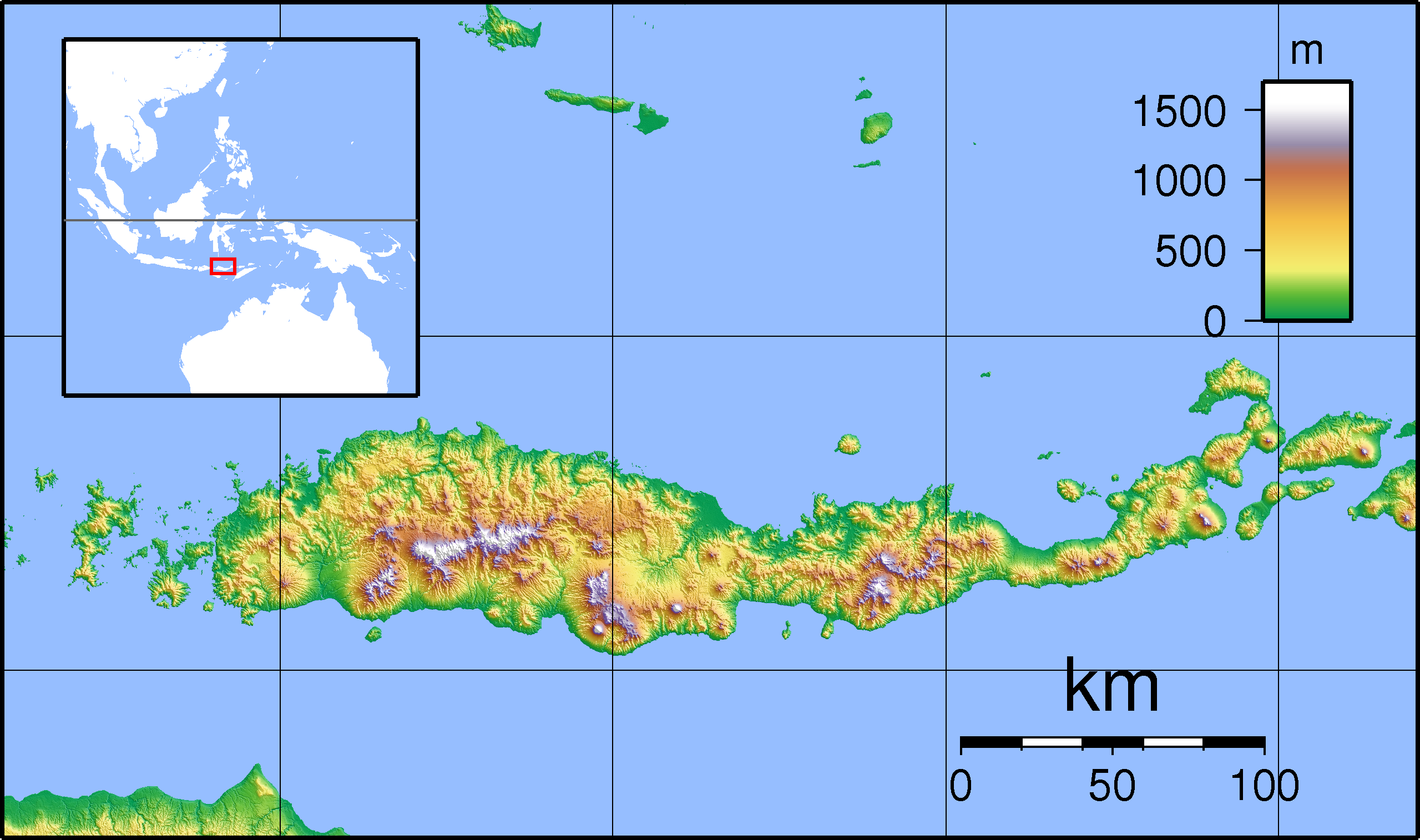
- Location in East Nusa Tenggara and Indonesia Jaong (Lesser Sunda Islands) Jaong (Indonesia)
- Coordinates: 8°38′44.376″S 120°23′25.3968″E
- Country: Indonesia
- Province: East Nusa Tenggara
- Regency: Manggarai Regency
- District: Satar Mese District
- Elevation: 4,239 ft (1,292 m)

Population (2010)
  - Total: 2,162
- Time zone: UTC+8 (Indonesia Central Standard Time)

Jaong is a village in Satar Mese District, Manggarai Regency in East Nusa Tenggara Province. Its population is 1219.

== Climate ==
Jaong has a subtropical highland climate (Cfb). It has moderate rainfall from June to September and heavy to very heavy rainfall in the remaining months.

Climate data for Jaong
Month	Jan	Feb	Mar	Apr	May	Jun	Jul	Aug	Sep	Oct	Nov	Dec	Year
Mean daily maximum °C (°F)	24.2 (75.6)	23.9 (75.0)	24.3 (75.7)	24.5 (76.1)	24.0 (75.2)	23.2 (73.8)	23.1 (73.6)	23.6 (74.5)	24.6 (76.3)	25.6 (78.1)	25.2 (77.4)	24.6 (76.3)	24.2 (75.6)
Daily mean °C (°F)	19.4 (66.9)	19.3 (66.7)	19.5 (67.1)	19.4 (66.9)	18.9 (66.0)	18.0 (64.4)	17.5 (63.5)	17.6 (63.7)	18.6 (65.5)	19.7 (67.5)	20.1 (68.2)	19.7 (67.5)	19.0 (66.2)
Mean daily minimum °C (°F)	14.7 (58.5)	14.7 (58.5)	14.7 (58.5)	14.4 (57.9)	13.8 (56.8)	12.9 (55.2)	11.9 (53.4)	11.7 (53.1)	12.6 (54.7)	13.9 (57.0)	15.0 (59.0)	14.9 (58.8)	13.8 (56.8)
Average precipitation mm (inches)	584 (23.0)	521 (20.5)	512 (20.2)	320 (12.6)	212 (8.3)	97 (3.8)	73 (2.9)	80 (3.1)	143 (5.6)	282 (11.1)	402 (15.8)	484 (19.1)	3,710 (146)
Source: Climate-Data.org
