= Frans Sales Lega Airport =

Airport in Indonesia

Frans Sales Lega Airport Bandar Udara Frans Sales Lega
- IATA: RTG; ICAO: WATG

Summary
- Airport type: Public
- Owner: Government of Indonesia
- Operator: Directorate General of Civil Aviation
- Serves: Ruteng
- Location: Langke Rembong District, Manggarai Regency, Flores, East Nusa Tenggara, Indonesia
- Time zone: WITA (UTC+08:00)
- Elevation AMSL: 1,150 m (3,770 ft)
- Coordinates: 08°35′46″S 120°28′43″E

Map
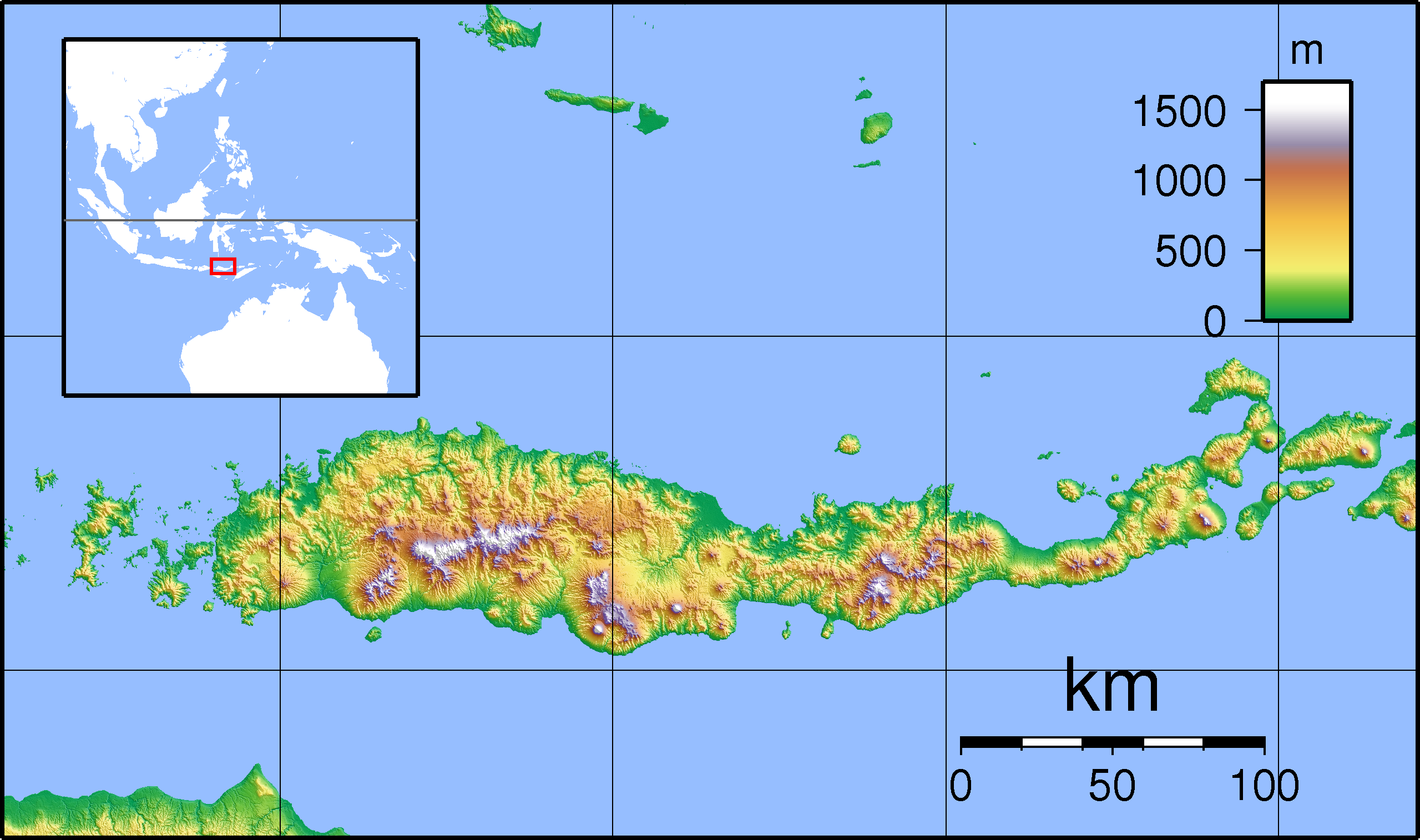
- Location in Flores Location in the Lesser Sunda Islands Location in Indonesia

Runways
| Direction | Length | | Surface |
| Direction | m | ft | Surface |
|---|---|---|---|
| 09/27 | 1,500 | 4,921 | Asphalt |

Statistics (2024)
- Passengers: 13,893 (▲35.6%)
- Cargo (tonnes): 4.60 (▲189.3%)
- Aircraft movements: 448 (▲50.3%)
- Source: DGCA

Frans Sales Lega Airport (IATA: RTG, ICAO: WATG), formerly Satar Tacik Airport, is a domestic regional airport serving Ruteng, the administrative capital of Manggarai Regency on the island of Flores, East Nusa Tenggara, Indonesia. The airport is named after Frans Sales Lega, a former regent of Manggarai who served from 1967 to 1978 and oversaw the construction of the airport. Administratively located in Tenda village, Langke Rembong District, approximately 2 km (1.2 mi) from the center of Ruteng, the airport serves as the main air gateway to Ruteng and Manggarai Regency, as well as the surrounding areas. As of 2026, two airlines operate scheduled services to the airport. Wings Air connects Ruteng with Kupang, the provincial capital of East Nusa Tenggara on Timor Island, while Susi Air operates pioneer flights to Waingapu on Sumba Island. Airlines such as Merpati Nusantara Airlines and TransNusa previously operated services to the airport, but have since discontinued their flights.

== History ==
=== Construction and early history ===
The initiative to build an airport serving Ruteng began in the late 1960s and early 1970s and was spearheaded by Frans Sales Lega, the then-Regent of Manggarai. He initiated plans for three airports in Manggarai Regency: one in Ruteng, the regency capital, one in Labuan Bajo, and one in Iteng. Of the three proposed airports, Lega oversaw the completion of the airports in Ruteng and Labuan Bajo.

Frans Sales Lega Airport, then known as Satar Tacik Airport, was constructed in 1970 and inaugurated in 1971 by Frans Seda, who was serving as Minister of Transportation at the time. Its construction was part of a government initiative to develop airstrips in rural areas of Indonesia where transportation infrastructure was limited, enabling these regions to be connected by pioneer air services. When the airport became operational, Zamrud Aviation Corporation was among the first airlines to serve the airport, operating Douglas DC-3 aircraft, alongside Merpati Nusantara Airlines, which operated de Havilland Canada DHC-6 Twin Otter aircraft. One of the earliest routes serving the airport was the Ruteng–Denpasar–Surabaya route, operated by Zamrud Aviation Corporation, while Merpati operated the Kupang–Ende–Ruteng–Bajawa–Ende–Kupang route.

By the 1980s, Merpati had introduced additional routes to Ruteng, including the Denpasar–Bima–Labuan Bajo–Ruteng route. During the decade, the government began planning the airport's development, including an extension of the runway to accommodate larger aircraft such as the Fokker F27 Friendship. Eventually, by 1988, the airport's runway had been extended to 1,300 m (4,265 ft), enabling it to accommodate aircraft up to the size of the CASA CN-235. In 1989, local farmers living near the airport protested over compensation for land used in its construction. As part of the protest, they slept on the runway, forcing the airport to close and preventing aircraft from landing.

By the early 2000s, Merpati continued to operate at the airport, serving the Kupang–Ruteng–Bima route with the CASA C-212 Aviocar. During this period, other airlines began introducing services to the airport, which had previously been served exclusively by Merpati. In October 2012, TransNusa launched a direct route between Ruteng and Denpasar, eliminating the need for passengers to transit through Kupang.

=== Contemporary history ===
In 2008, the Ministry of Transportation officially renamed the airport to its current name in honor of Frans Sales Lega, who spearheaded its construction and development and made significant contributions to Manggarai Regency.

In 2015, two airlines introduced new routes to Ruteng. Susi Air launched a pioneer route to Waingapu, while Aviastar introduced a service from Ruteng to Selayar in South Sulawesi. TransNusa also inaugurated a route between Kupang and Ruteng that year. At the time, the East Nusa Tenggara Tourism and Creative Economy Bureau also lobbied Garuda Indonesia to establish a direct route between Ruteng and Denpasar in an effort to boost tourism in Ruteng and the surrounding areas.

In 2017, police investigated a corruption case involving the construction of the airport's new terminal. The project was found to have suffered damage across various segments and work items, with indications that some of the work did not comply with the specifications stipulated in the contract. The Audit Board of Indonesia (BPK) estimated that the case resulted in state losses of approximately Rp8 billion. In 2025, the Manggarai Regency Prosecutor's Office prosecuted three individuals from the project's contractor who were involved in the corruption case, with the defendants receiving prison sentences ranging from five to eight years.

TransNusa ceased operations at the airport in 2020 amid the COVID-19 pandemic, after which Wings Air took over the Kupang–Ruteng route on 24 November 2020, operating the service with ATR 72-500 aircraft. Following TransNusa's withdrawal from the airport, Susi Air and Wings Air became the only two airlines operating scheduled services to and from Ruteng. The airport authorities and the Manggarai Regency government have since lobbied Wings Air and the Ministry of Transportation to approve and introduce additional routes from Ruteng, including services to Labuan Bajo and Lombok, as well as the resumption of flights to Denpasar.

== Facilities and development ==
The airport occupies a site covering 60 hectares (148 acres). Its passenger terminal has a floor area of 2,222 m² (23,918 sq ft) and is capable of handling approximately 14,082 passengers annually. The terminal was last renovated in 2025 at a cost of approximately Rp29 billion. Its design combines modernity with Manggarai cultural heritage. A giant Manggarai songket motif covers almost the entire wall of the departure terminal, with each geometric pattern serving not merely as decoration but as a visual representation of Manggarai's cultural heritage. A miniature Mbaru Niang, the distinctive conical traditional house of Wae Rebo, also features prominently in the terminal, while its undulating roof is designed to evoke the contours of the mountains of Nuca Lale. In addition to the passenger terminal, the airport is equipped with several supporting facilities, including a 500 m² (5,382 sq ft) administration office, a 240 m² (2,583 sq ft) power house, a 200 m² (2,153 sq ft) workshop, a 48 m² (517 sq ft) electrical building, a 268 m² (2,885 sq ft) aircraft rescue and firefighting (PKP-PK) building, and a terminal parking area covering approximately 6,330 m² (68,134 sq ft).

On the airside, the airport is equipped with a single runway measuring 1,500 m × 30 m (4,921 ft × 98 ft), capable of accommodating aircraft up to the size of the ATR 72. The runway is non-instrument and lacks published straight-in instrument approach procedures and electronic navigation aids such as an Instrument Landing System (ILS). Consequently, aircraft operating at the airport rely on visual approaches and are restricted to daytime operations. The government has planned to extend the runway westward by 300 m to 1,800 m (5,906 ft), which would allow the airport to accommodate narrow-body aircraft.In addition to the runway, the airport is equipped with two taxiways connecting the runway to the apron, each measuring 75 m × 18 m (246 ft × 59 ft), and an aircraft apron measuring 210 m × 70 m (689 ft × 230 ft).

== Airlines and destinations ==
| Airlines | Destinations |
|---|---|
| Susi Air | Waingapu |
| Wings Air | Kupang |

== Statistics ==
A Wings Air ATR 72 and an Indonesian National Police CASA C-212 Aviocar at Frans Sales Lega Airport

Annual passenger numbers and aircraft statistics
| Year | Passengers handled | Passenger % change | Cargo (tonnes) | Cargo % change | Aircraft movements | Aircraft % change |
|---|---|---|---|---|---|---|
| 2006 | 25,841 | Steady | 48.98 | Steady | 872 | Steady |
| 2007 | 21,589 | ▼16.5 | 75.56 | ▲54.3 | 660 | ▼24.3 |
| 2008 | 13,422 | ▼37.8 | 41.75 | ▼44.7 | 494 | ▼25.2 |
| 2009 | 12,449 | ▼7.2 | 99.22 | ▲137.7 | 374 | ▼24.3 |
| 2010 | 9,509 | ▼23.6 | 39.14 | ▼60.6 | 356 | ▼4.8 |
| 2011 | 19,455 | ▲104.6 | 62.27 | ▲59.1 | 542 | ▲52.2 |
| 2012 | 37,682 | ▲93.7 | 44.75 | ▼28.1 | 942 | ▲73.8 |
| 2013 | 38,548 | ▲2.3 | 53.90 | ▲20.4 | 906 | ▼3.8 |
| 2014 | 25,196 | ▼34.6 | 35,34 | ▼34.4 | 676 | ▼25.4 |
| 2015 | 32,777 | ▲30.1 | 60.59 | ▲71.4 | 998 | ▲47.6 |
| 2016 | 25,690 | ▼21.6 | 48.98 | ▼19.2 | 774 | ▼22.4 |
| 2017 | 11,167 | ▼56.5 | 59.01 | ▲20.5 | 642 | ▼17.1 |
| 2018 | 28,755 | ▲157.5 | 89.61 | ▲51.9 | 848 | ▲32.1 |
| 2019 | 26,171 | ▼9.0 | 87.85 | ▼2.0 | 784 | ▼7.5 |
| 2020 | 12,328 | ▼52.9 | 67.20 | ▼23.5 | 428 | ▼45.4 |
| 2021 | 22,136 | ▲79.6 | 55.68 | ▼17.1 | 616 | ▲43.9 |
| 2022 | 13,510 | ▼39.0 | 15.43 | ▼72.3 | 350 | ▼43.2 |
| 2023 | 10,245 | ▼24.2 | 1.59 | ▼89.7 | 298 | ▼14.9 |
| 2024 | 13,893 | ▲35.6 | 4.60 | ▲189.3 | 448 | ▲50.3 |
^{Source: DGCA, BPS}
