= Borong, Flores =

Town in Flores Island, Indonesia

Borong
- Town
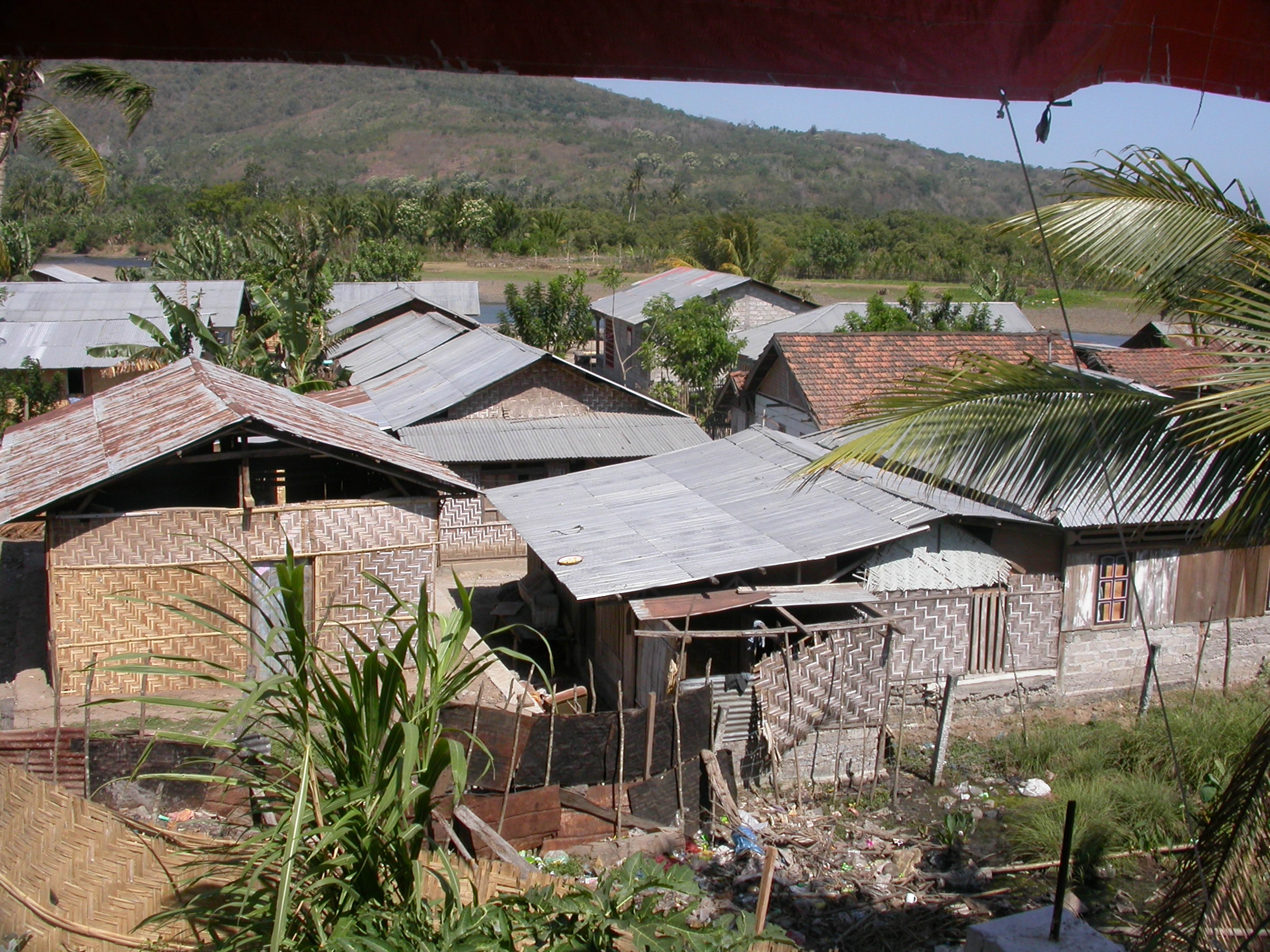
- Borong in 2006
- Interactive map of Borong
- Coordinates: 8°48′52.36″S 120°36′29.45″E
- Country: Indonesia
- Province: East Nusa Tenggara
- Regency: East Manggarai Regency
- Island: Flores

Area
  - Total: 177.4 km^{2} (68.5 sq mi)

Population (2024)
  - Total: 43,443
  - Density: 244.9/km^{2} (634.3/sq mi)

Borong ia a town and an administrative district (kecamatan) situated on Flores Island, East Nusa Tenggara Province of Indonesia. The town, which is a port on the south coast of Flores, serves as the administrative capital of East Manggarai Regency. The district covers an area of 177.44 km^{2} and had a population of 42,600 at the 2020 Census; the official estimate as at mid 2024 was 43,443.

== Villages ==
There are 18 towns and villages, of which three are classed as urban kelurahan and 15 as rural desa. These are listed below with their populations as at mid 2024.

- Nanga Labang (3,506)
- Golo kantar (1,686)
- Rana Loba (3,352)
- Kota Ndora (5,322)
- Rana Masak (1,306)
- Ngampang Mas (1,648)
- Benteng Raja (1,832)
- Benteng Riwu (2,231)
- Poco Ri’i (2,540)
- Golo Lalong (952)
- Gurung Liwut (3,298)
- Compang Ndejing (2,795)
- Bangka Kantar (2,401)
- Satar Peot (4,874)
- Balus Permai (1,771)
- Compang Tenda (598)
- Waling (1,930)
- Golo Leda (1,401)
