= East Manggarai Regency =

Regency in East Nusa Tenggara, Indonesia

East Manggarai Regency Kabupaten Manggarai Timur
- Regency
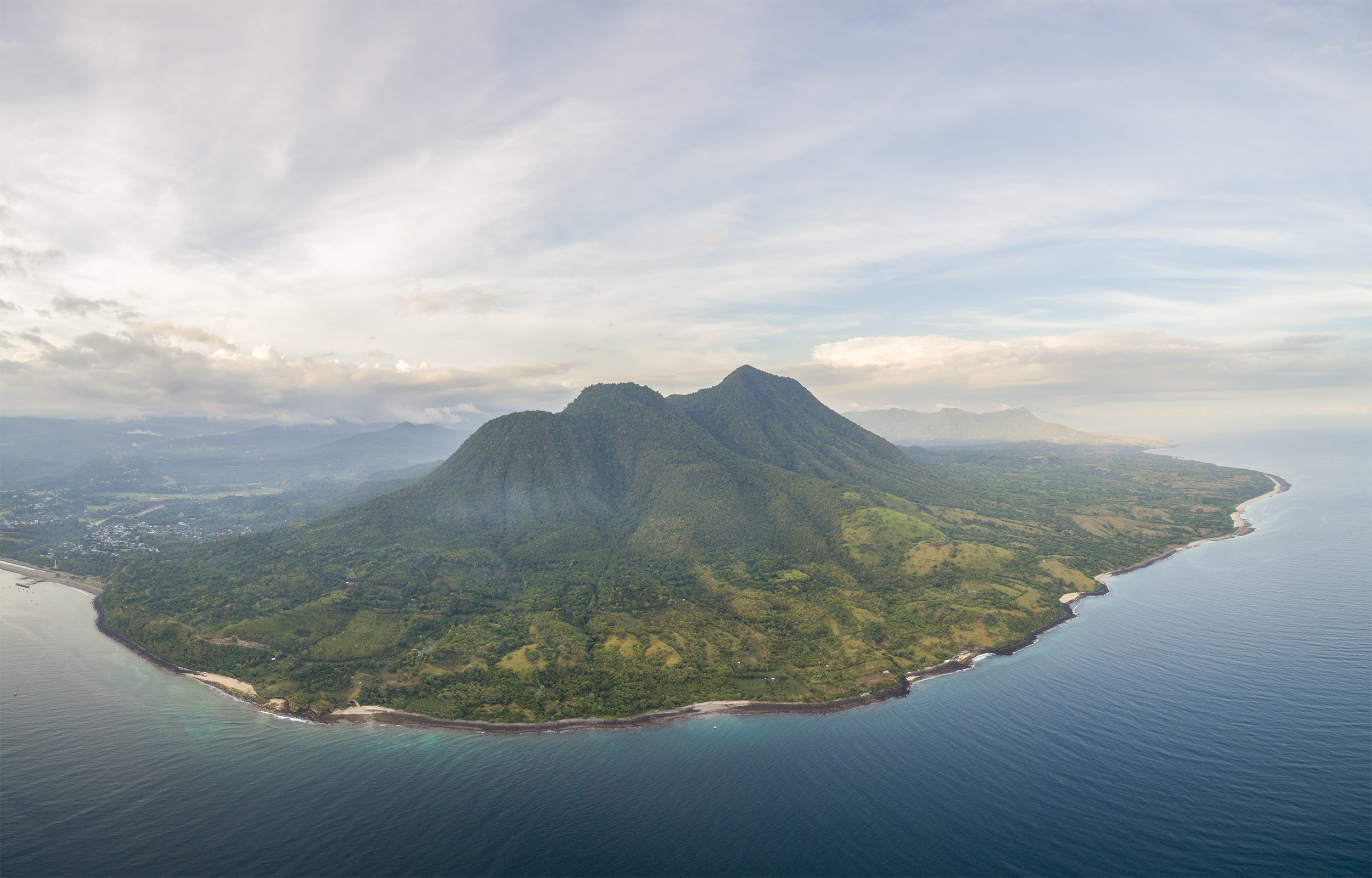
- Pocondeki Mountain

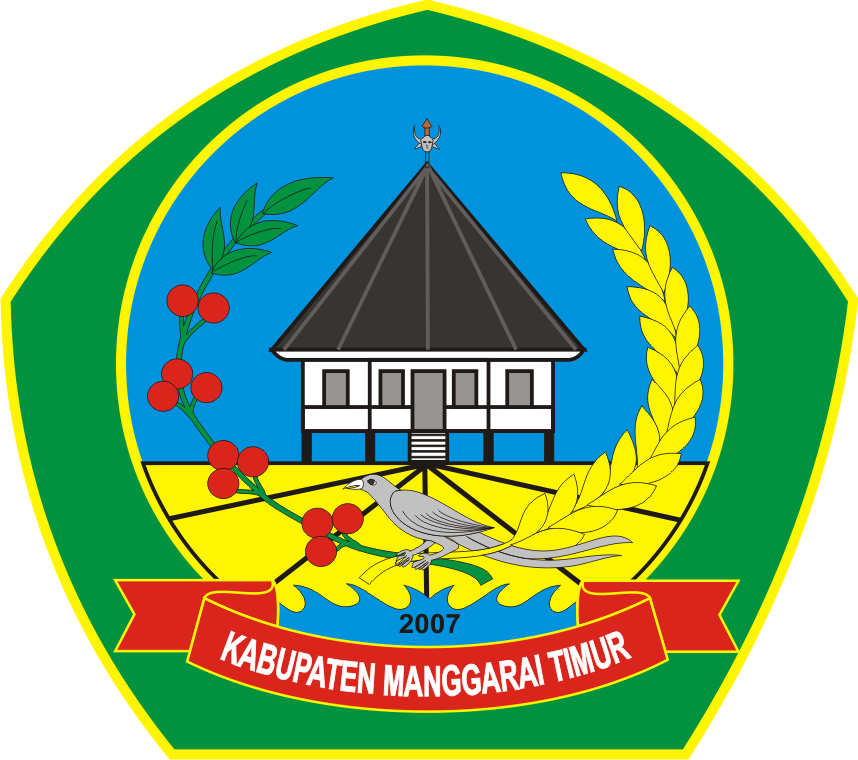
- Seal

- Location within East Nusa Tenggara

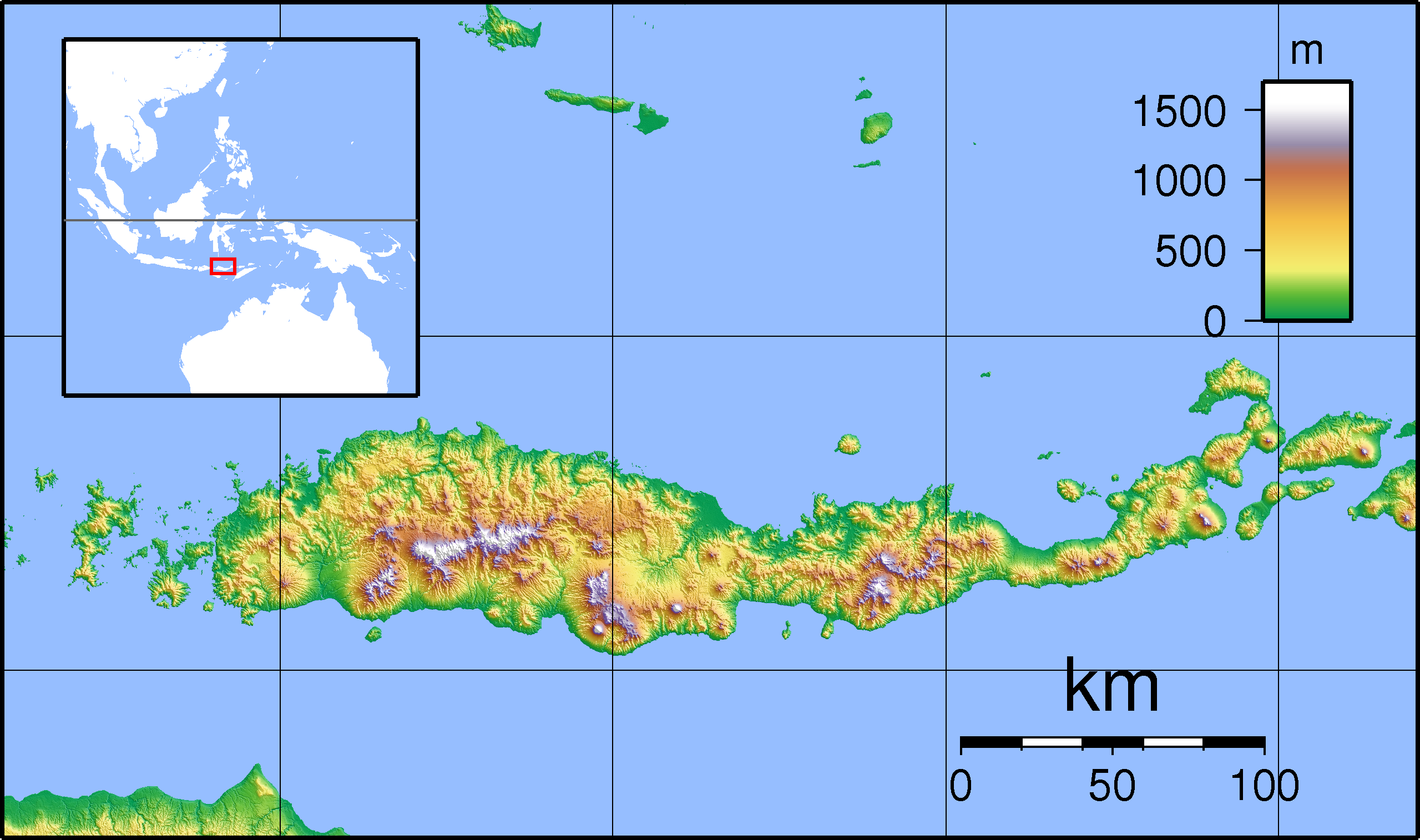
- Location in Flores, Lesser Sunda Islands and Indonesia East Manggarai Regency (Lesser Sunda Islands) East Manggarai Regency (Indonesia)
- Coordinates: 8°45′0″S 120°36′31″E
- Country: Indonesia
- Province: East Nusa Tenggara
- Capital: Borong

Government
  - Regent: Agas Andreas
  - Vice Regent: Tarsisius Sjukur

Area
  - Total: 2,389.53 km^{2} (922.60 sq mi)

Population (mid 2025 estimate)
  - Total: 306,838
  - Density: 128.409/km^{2} (332.579/sq mi)
- Area code: (+62) 384
- Website: manggaraitimurkab.go.id

East Manggarai Regency (Indonesian: Kabupaten Manggarai Timur) is a regency in East Nusa Tenggara province of Indonesia. Established on 17 July 2007 (out of the eastern six districts of the original Manggarai Regency), the regency has its seat (capital) in the town of Borong, a port on the south coast of Flores. It covers a land area of 2,389.53 km^{2}. The population at the 2010 Census was 252,754, and at the 2020 Census was 275,603; the official estimate as of mid-2025 was 306,838 (comprising 155,058 males and 151,780 females).

== Tourism ==
The local government is aiming to promote a range of tourist sites including the following:

- Nanga Labang village, on the seashore with pristine beaches
- Lake Air Panas (Hot Water) in Rana Masak
- Gampang Mas village near Borong
- Laka Rana Tojong where the giant lily (Victoria amazonica) grows.

An additional feature of interest in the regency is the Pota Komodo dragon which has similar traits to the more well-known Komodo dragon found in neighbouring West Manggarai Regency. The population of the Pota Komodo dragon has been declining and there is now concern about conservation of the local dragon population.

International visitors travel through various parts of the district, sometimes liaising with local groups such as village Catholic communities. In late 2012, one visiting Polish couple took the decision to be married in Lait Valley in the Kota Komba area.

== Administrative districts ==
The East Manggarai Regency, when established in 2007, was divided into six districts (kecamatan), Borong and Kota Kombo districts in the south of the regency and Elar, Sambi Rampas, Poco Renata and Lamba Leda districts in the north. However, after 2010 three additional districts (Elar Selatan, Poco Ranaka Timur and Rana Mese) were created by splitting of existing districts, and in 2021 three more districts were created from existing districts (Kota Komba Utara from part of Kota Komba District, Congkar from part of Sambi Rampas District, and Lamba Leda Utara from part of Lamba Leda District), while Poco Renata and Poco Renata Timur districts were renamed Lamba Leda Selatan and Lamba Leda Timur respectively.

The twelve districts are tabulated below with their areas and their populations at the 2010 Census and the 2020 Census, together with the official estimates as of mid-2025. The table also includes the locations of the administrative centres, the number of administrative villages in each district (a total of 159 rural desa and 17 urban kelurahan), and its post codes.

Kode Wilayah	Name of District (kecamatan)	Area in km^{2}	Pop'n Census 2010	Pop'n Census 2020	Pop'n Estimate mid 2025	Admin centre	No. of villages	Post codes
53.19.01	Borong	177.28	61,509	42,600	50,255	Kota Ndora	18 ^{(a)}	86571
53.19.07	Rana Mese	209.33	^{(b)}	28,900	32,471	Golo Mongkok	21	86570
53.19.06	Kota Komba	327.55	46,171	51,300	34,709	Watu Nggene	11 ^{(c)}	86572
53.19.10	Kota Komba Utara (North Kota Komba)	183.00	^{(d)}	^{(d)}	23,099	Rana Mbeling	11	86572
Totals	Southern group	897.16	107,680	122,800	140,534		61	
53.19.05	Elar	280.57	29,981	15,100	16,798	Tiwu Kondo	15 ^{(e)}	86581
53.19.09	Elar Selatan (South Elar)	223.42	^{(f)}	17,600	19,593	Lempang Paji	14 ^{(g)}	86580
53.19.04	Sambi Rampas	288.15	26,175	27,300	15,232	Pota	9 ^{(h)}	86584
53.19.12	Congkar	80.07	^{(i)}	^{(i)}	14,338	Watunggong	11 ^{(j)}	86584
53.19.02	Lamba Leda Selatan (South Lamba Leda)	121.90	57,459	33,400	35,588	Mandosawu	24 ^{(k)}	86583
53.19.08	Lamba Leda Timur (East Lamba Leda)	104.15	^{(m)}	27,070	29,546	Lawir	18	86585
53.19.03	Lamba Leda	121.74	31,449	32,600	16,964	Tengku Leda	13	86582
53.19.11	Lamba Leda Utara (North Lamba Leda)	272.37	^{(n)}	^{(n)}	18,245	Satar Padut	11	86582
Totals	Northern group	1,492.37	145,074	152,803	166,304		115	
	Totals	2,389.53	252,754	275,603	306,838	Borong	176	

Notes: (a) including the three kelurahan of Mandosawu, Nggalak Leleng and Satar Peot.
(b) the 2010 population of the new Rana Mese District is included with the figure for Borong District.
(c) including the three kelurahan of Rongga Koe, Tanah Rata and Watu Nggene.
(d) the 2010 and 2020 populations of the new Kota Komba Utara District are included with the figures for Kota Komba District.
(e) including the kelurahan of Tiwu Kondo.
(f) the 2010 population of the new Elar Selatan District is included with the figure for Elar District.
(g) including the kelurahan of Lempang Paji. (h) including the three kelurahan of Nanga Baras, Pota and Ulung Baras.
(i) the 2010 and 2020 populations of the new Congkar District are included with the figures for Sambia Rampas District.
(j) including the three kelurahan of Golo Wangkung, Golo Wangkung Barat and Golo Wangkung Utara.
(k) including the three kelurahan of Bangka Leleng, Mandosawu and Nggalak Leleng.
(m) the 2010 population of the new Lamba Leda Timur District is included with the figure for Lamba Leda Selatan District.
(n) the 2010 and 2020 populations of the new Lamba Leda Utara District are included with the figures for Lamba Leda District.
