= Benyamin Yosef Bria =

Mgr. Benyamin Yosef Bria
- Bishop Diocese of Denpasar
- See: Diocese of Denpasar
- Appointed: April 14, 2000
- Predecessor: Vitalis Djebarus
- Successor: Silvester Tung Kiem San
- Other post

Orders
- Ordination: June 29, 1985
- Consecration: August 6, 2000

Personal details
- Born: Benyamin Yosef Bria; August 7, 1956 Kupang, Indonesia
- Died: September 18, 2007 Mount Elizabeth Hospital, Singapore
- Buried: Palasari, Bali
- Denomination: Catholic

Benyamin Yosef Bria (August 7, 1956 – September 18, 2007) was the Indonesian Bishop of the Roman Catholic Diocese of Denpasar. The diocese is based in the city of Denpasar, on Bali, Indonesia.

== Biography ==
Benyamin Yosef Bria was born on August 7, 1956. Bria was ordained a Roman Catholic priest on June 29, 1985. He was appointed bishop of Denpasar on April 14, 2000, and was formally ordained as the Bishop of Denpasar on August 7, 2000. Bria remained as bishop until his death in 2007.

In 2005, Bria led memorial masses in Adelaide, Australia, to remember victims of the Bali bombings.

Bishop Benyamin Yosef Bria died of renal failure at Mount Elisabeth Hospital in Singapore on September 18, 2007, at 9.18 A.M. He was 51 years old.

According to an Antara News report, Bria's nieces, Elis, Ela and Gin, all from Atambua, East Nusa Tenggara, and two Roman Catholic priests from the Diocese of Denpasar, Fathers Matheus and Hadi, were at his bedside when he died. He was also survived by two cousins, Father Maxi Un and Antonius Un Taolin.
