= Diocese of Denpasar =

Roman Catholic diocese in Indonesia

Coordinates: 8.6500°S 115.2170°E

Diocese of Denpasar Diœcesis Denpasarensis Keuskupan Denpasar
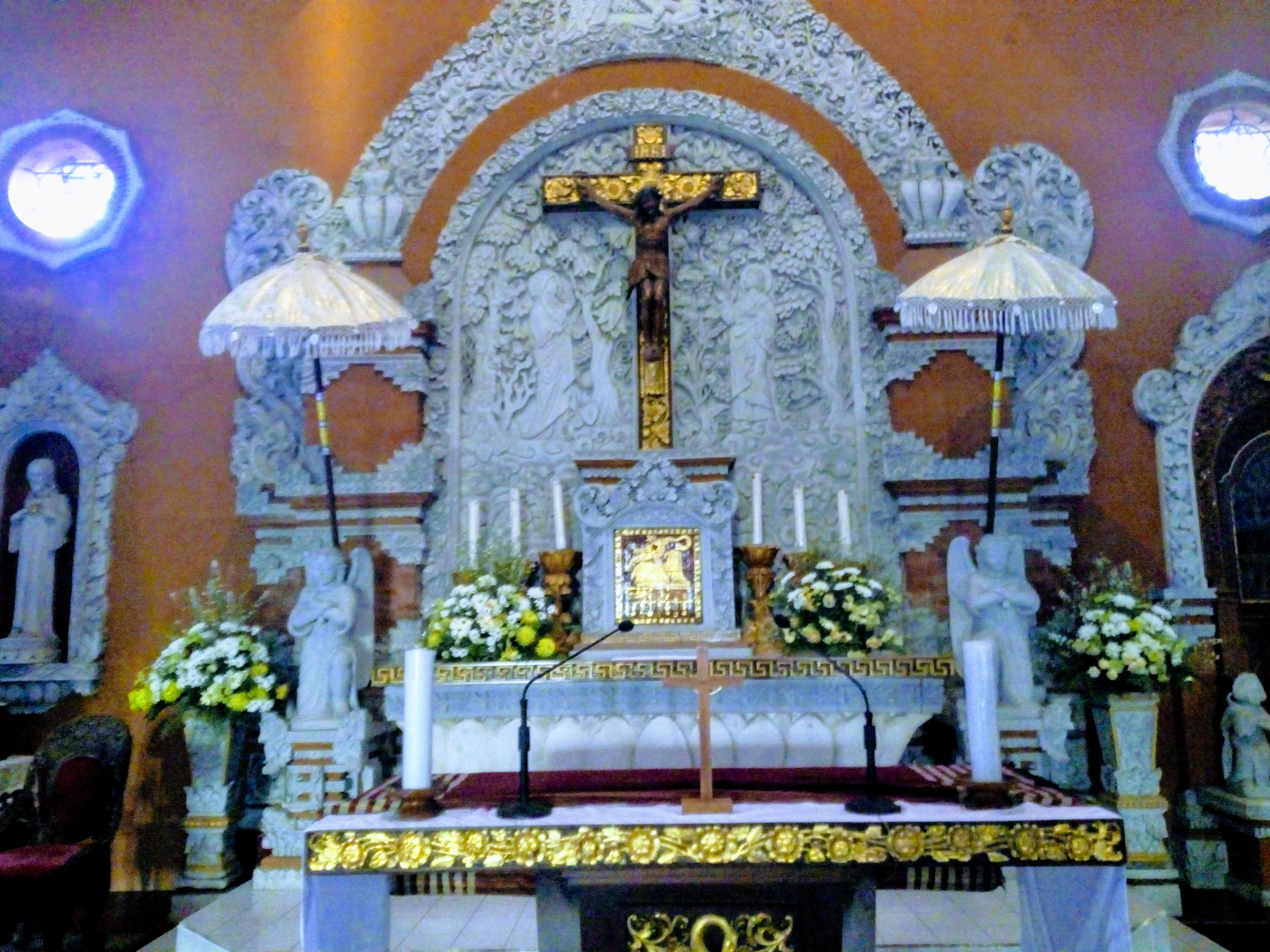

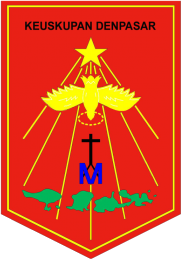
- Coat of arms

Location
- Country: Indonesia
- Ecclesiastical province: Ende
- Metropolitan: Ende

Statistics
- Area: 25,786 km^{2} (9,956 sq mi)
- Population: Total; Catholics: (as of 2019); 9,407,285; 32,083 (0.34%)

Information
- Denomination: Roman Catholic
- Rite: Latin Rite
- Cathedral: Holy Spirit Cathedral, Denpasar
- Language: Ecclesiastical Latin; English language; Indonesian language

Current leadership
- Pope: Leo XIV
- Bishop: Silvester Tung Kiem San
- Metropolitan Archbishop: Paul Boedhie Kleden, SVD

Website
- https://www.keuskupandenpasar.net/

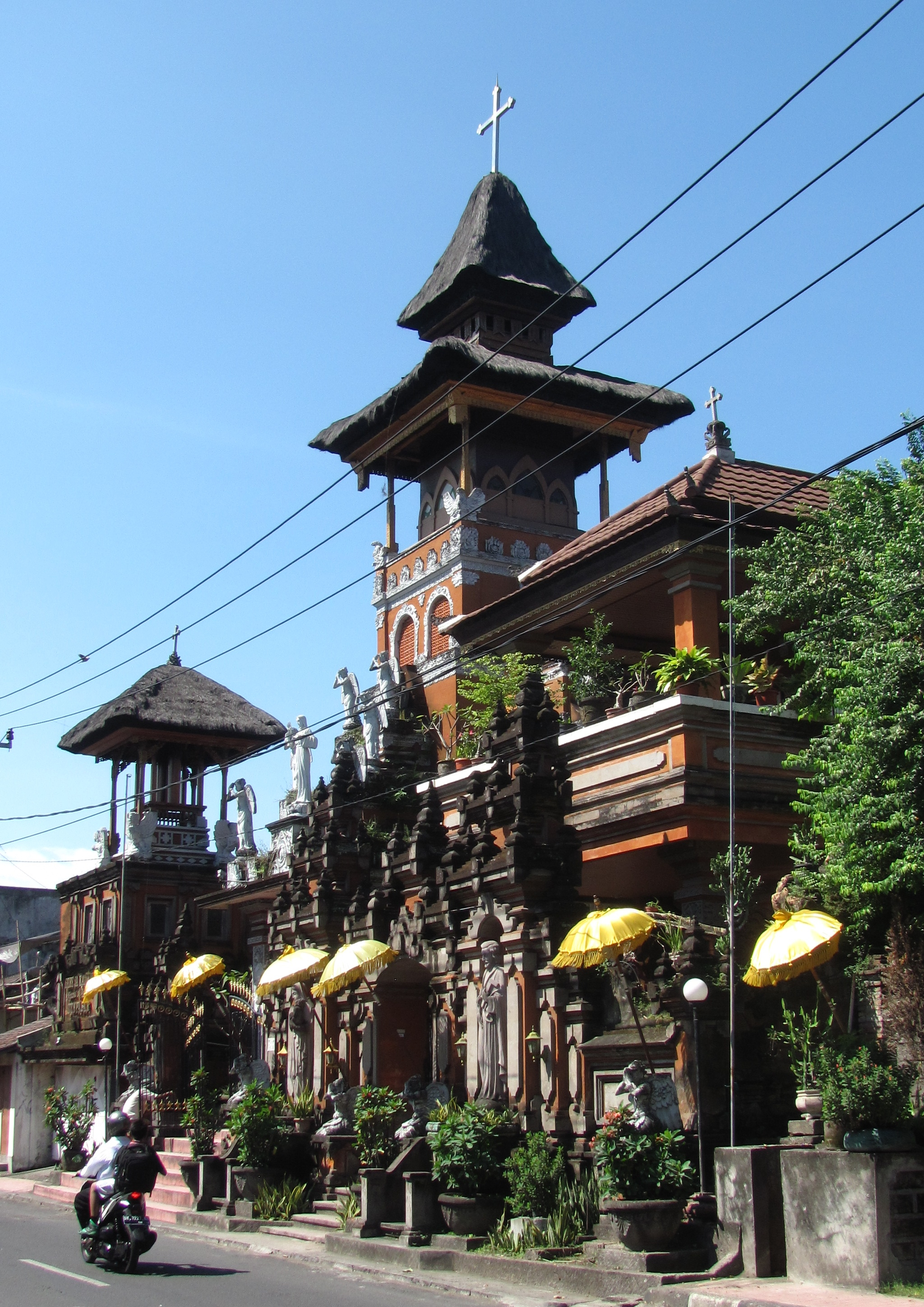
Saint Joseph's Roman Catholic Church, Denpasar, Bali, Indonesia

The Roman Catholic Diocese of Denpasar (Latin: Denpasaren(sis)) is a diocese of the ecclesiastical province of Ende, in Indonesia. The diocese encompasses the predominantly Hindu province of Bali and the mostly Muslim province of West Nusa Tenggara and has its see in Denpasar, the capital city of Bali.

== History ==
- 10 July 1950: Established as Apostolic Prefecture of Denpasar from the Apostolic Vicariate of Isole della Piccola Sonda
- 3 January 1961: Promoted as Diocese of Denpasar

== Leadership ==
- Bishops of Denpasar (Roman rite)
  - Bishop Silvester Tung Kiem San (22 November 2008 - )
  - Bishop Benyamin Yosef Bria (14 April 2000 – 18 September 2007)
  - Bishop Vitalis Djebarus, S.V.D. (4 September 1980 – 22 September 1998)
  - Bishop Antoine Hubert Thijssen, S.V.D. (Apostolic Administrator 1973 – 4 September 1980)
  - Bishop Paul Sani Kleden, S.V.D. (4 July 1961 – 17 November 1972)
- Prefects Apostolic of Denpasar (Roman Rite)
  - Fr. Uberto Hermens, S.V.D. (19 July 1950 – 1961)
