= Johannes Wolfgang von Bodman =

German auxiliary bishop (1651-1691)

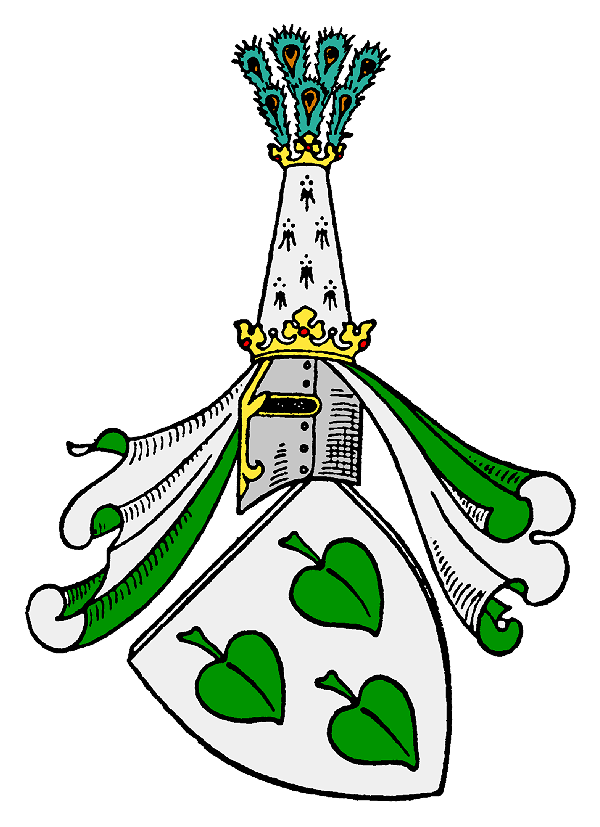
Coat of arms of the von Bodman family

Johannes Wolfgang Reichsfreiherr von Bodman (January 19, 1651 in Bodman – September 29, 1691) was auxiliary bishop of Konstanz (Germany) from 1686 until he died in 1691.

== Life ==
Von Bodman came from the old Swabian noble family Bodman. He was the son of Hans Adam von Bodman and Mary Magdalene von Sickingen. He had two brothers, Johann Adam and Johann Joseph, little is known of his family.

From 1666 to 1673 he studied in Rome at the Collegium Germanicum et Hungaricum. He was ordained a deacon on 5 February 1673 for the Diocese of Konstanz and priest on 6 August the same year.

He was consecrated as bishop on November 26, 1686 at Konstanz. Since the consecrator of him is not known and some of the bishops alive today can trace their episcopal lineage back to him, the person of Johannes von Bodman is very important for the history of the Catholic Church. This so-called von Bodman lineage includes seven members of the episcopate, six of them in Indonesia and one in Belgium.
