= Sylvester Tung Kiem San =

His Excellency, The Most Reverend Sylvester Tung Kiem San
- Bishop of Denpasar
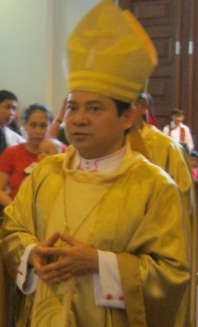
- Diocese: Denpasar
- Appointed: 22 November 2008
- Installed: 19 February 2009
- Predecessor: Benyamin Yosef Bria

Orders
- Ordination: 29 July 1988 by Donatus Djagom
- Consecration: 19 February 2009 by Vincentius Sensi Potokota

Personal details
- Born: 11 July 1961 (age 64) Mauponggo, Nagekeo Regency, East Nusa Tenggara, Flores, Indonesia
- Education: Pontifical Urban University
- Motto: Deus incrementum dedit (Latin for 'God gave the increase')

Styles of Sylvester Tung Kiem San
- Reference style: His Excellency; The Most Reverend
- Spoken style: Your Excellency
- Religious style: Bishop

Silvester San is a bishop in Denpasar, Indonesia, since 2008.

== Biography ==
San Silvester was born in Mauponggo, Nagekeo Regency, Flores, on August 14, 1961. He was the son of Roben Robo (father) and Katharina No'o Nore (mother). He graduated from the SDK Maukeli, Seminary High St. John Berkmans Todabelu Mataloko Ngada (SMP-SMA), Philosophy of Catholic High School (STFK) Ledalero Maumere, and was ordained a priest of the archdiocese of Ende on July 29, 1988 by Msgr. Donatus Djagom, SVD, Archbishop of Ende.

After his ordination as a priest, he was assigned as assistant parish priest of the Holy Spirit, and taught at the Mataloko Todabelu seminary. In 1990 he studied at the Pontifical Urbaniana University in Rome, specializing in Biblical Theology. and in 1992 earned his licentiate with the thesis of "The Mercy of God in the Parables of Luke 15". After becoming coach of the seminarians and teaching at Maumere Ritapiret STFK Ledalero from 1992 to 1995, he returned to university and earned his doctorate at Urbaniarum Biblical Theology in 1997 with a dissertation on "The Experience of the Risen Lord in Luke 24:1 -35". In 1998 he returned to Indonesia and became a staff coach at the Ritapiret Seminary and a teacher at STFK Ledalero. In 2004 he was appointed Praeser at Ritapiret Seminary.

San Silvester was appointed Bishop of Denpasar by Pope Benedict XVI as published by the Holy See on November 22, 2008.
