= Manggarai Regency =

Regency in East Nusa Tenggara, Indonesia

Manggarai Regency Kabupaten Manggarai
- Regency
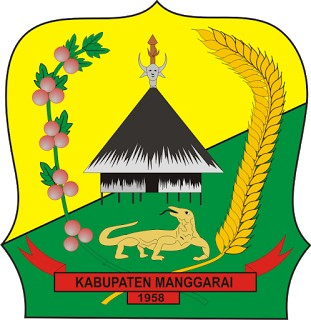
- Coat of arms

- Location within East Nusa Tenggara

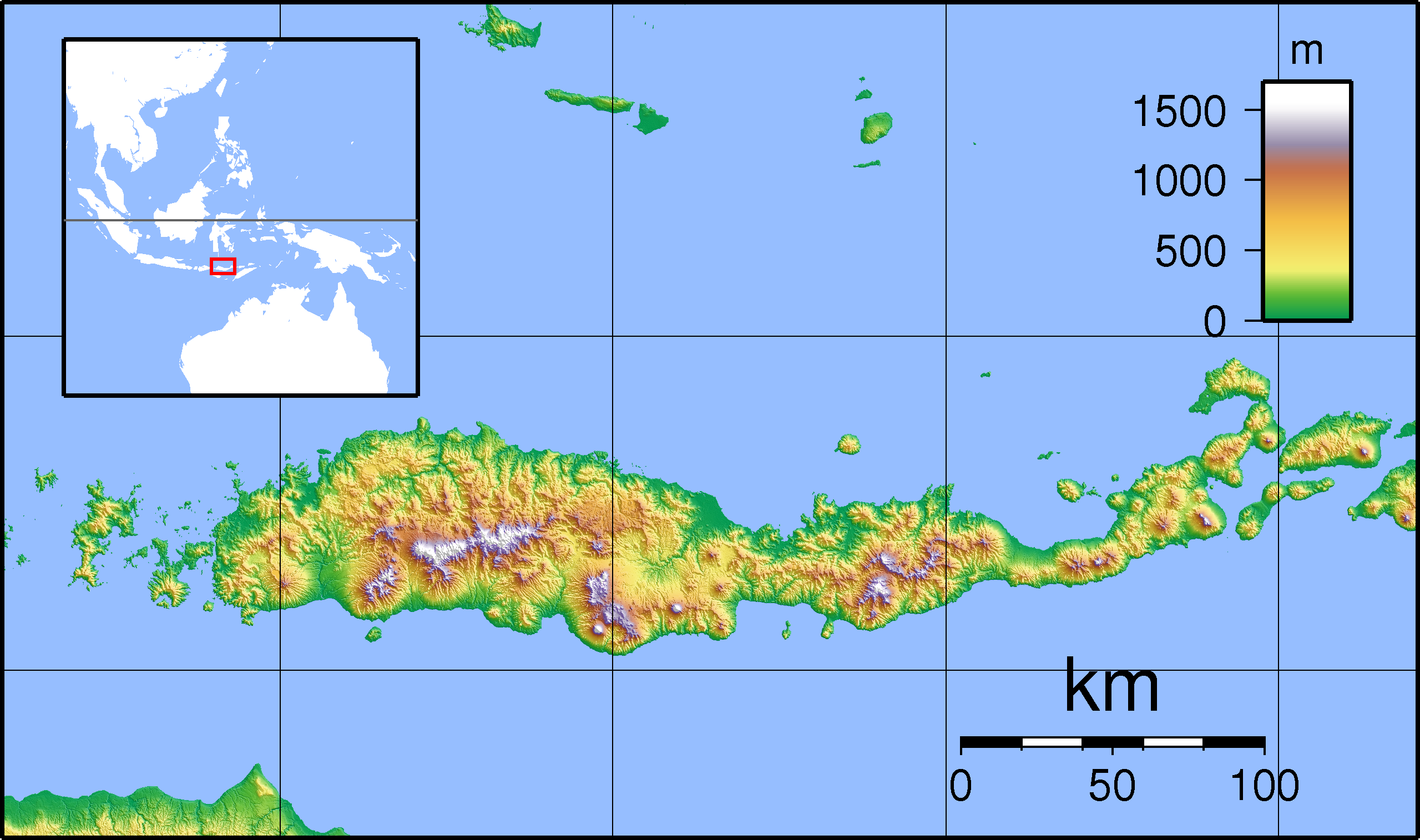
- Location in Flores, Lesser Sunda Islands and Indonesia Manggarai Regency (Lesser Sunda Islands) Manggarai Regency (Indonesia)
- Coordinates: 8.6127°S 120.4626°E
- Country: Indonesia
- Province: East Nusa Tenggara
- Capital: Ruteng

Government
  - Regent: Herybertus Geradus Laju Nabit
  - Vice Regent: Heribertus Ngabut

Area
  - Total: 1,343.83 km^{2} (518.86 sq mi)

Population (mid 2025 estimate)
  - Total: 340,153
  - Density: 253.122/km^{2} (655.583/sq mi)
- Area code: (+62) 385
- Website: manggaraikab.go.id

Manggarai Regency is a regency in East Nusa Tenggara province of Indonesia, situated on the island of Flores. Established in 1958 to encompass the 6,924.18 km^{2} area of the lands of the indigenous Manggarai people (speaking the various dialects of the Rombo Manggarai language), the regency was reduced in area (by over 80%) and in population by the separation of the more western districts to form West Manggarai Regency on 25 February 2003 and of the more eastern districts to form East Manggarai Regency on 17 July 2007.

The area of the residual Manggarai Regency is 1,343.83 km^{2} and its population was 292,037 at the 2010 census and 312,855 at the 2020 census; the official estimate as of mid-2025 was 340,153 (comprising 170,185 males and 169,968 females). The capital of the regency is the town of Ruteng (which equates to the urban Langke Rembong District, and NOT to the rural Ruteng District).

The Liang Bua archeological site is in Manggarai regency, about 10 km to the north of Ruteng.

== Administrative districts ==
Manggarai Regency was one of the original regencies of East Nusa Tenggara Province, but was reduced in area and population on 25 February 2003 when some of its western districts were split off to form the West Manggarai Regency (Kabupaten Manggarai Barat), and then reduced again on 17 July 2007 when some eastern districts were split off to form the East Manggarai Regency (Kabupaten Manggarai Timur). The area of the remaining Manggarai Regency as at 2010 was divided into nine districts (kecamatan), but since 2010 three additional districts – Cibal Barat, Reok Barat, and subsequently Satar Mese Utara – have been created by splitting of existing districts.

The districts are tabulated below with their areas and their populations at the 2010 census and the 2020 census, together with the official estimates as of mid-2025. The table also includes the locations of the district administrative centres, the number of administrative villages in each district (totaling 145 rural desa and 26 urban kelurahan), and its postal codes.

Kode Wilayah	Name of District (kecamatan)	Area in km^{2}	Pop'n census 2010	Pop'n census 2020	Pop'n estimate mid 2025	Admin centre	No. of villages	Post codes
53.10.05	Satar Mese	191.53	30,583	33,917	37,500	Iteng	23	86561
53.10.13	Satar Mese Barat (West Satar Mese) ^{(a)}	128.16	30,044	18,944	21,100	Narang	12	86560
53.10.18	Satar Mese Utara (North Satar Mese)	114.74	^{(b)}	14,854	16,500	Langke Majok	11	86562
53.10.12	Langke Rembong (Ruteng Town)	38.80	66,364	65,626	68,900	Ruteng	20 ^{(c)}	86511: 86519
53.10.03	Ruteng (rural)	87.35	38,888	41,533	45,000	Cancar	19 ^{(d)}	86523
53.10.01	Wae Rii	83.26	25,596	28,788	32,000	Timung	17	86594
53.10.15	Lelak	41.43	10,820	12,111	13,400	Rejeng	10	86521
53.10.14	Rahong Utara (North Rahong)	84.58	20,659	22,180	24,100	Purang	12	86522
53.10.06	Cibal	89.71	37,800	25,569	27,800	Pagal	17 ^{(e)}	86591
53.10.17	Cibal Barat (West Cibal)	76.25	^{(f)}	15,111	16,400	Golo Woi	10	86590
53.10.11	Reok	151.79	31,697	19,291	21,000	Reo	10 ^{(g)}	86592
53.10.16	Reok Barat (West Reok)	256.23	^{(h)}	14,931	16,300	Sambi	10	86593
	Totals	1,343.83	292,451	312,855	340,153	Ruteng	171	

Notes: (a) including the island of Pulau Mules off the south coast of Flores Island.
(b) the 2010 population of Satar Mese Utara District is included in the figure for Satar Mese Barat District, from which it was cut out.
(c) all 20 are kelurahan (Bangka Leda, Bangka Nekang, Carep, Compang Carep, Compang Tuke, Golo Dukal, Karot, Laci Carep, Lawir, Mbau Muku, Pau, Pitak, Poco Mal, Rowang, Satar Tacik, Tadong, Tenda, Wali, Waso and Watu).
(d) including the kelurahan of Wae Belang. (e) including the kelurahan of Pagal; there are also five preparatory villages (desa persiapan) which have recently been designated to bring the total to 22.
(f) the 2010 population of Cibal Barat District is included in the figure for Cibal District, from which it was cut out. (g) comprising 4 kelurahan (Baru, Mata Air, Reo and Wangkung) and 6 desa.
(h) the 2010 population of Reok Barat District is included in the figure for Reok District, from which it was cut out; these two districts are situated in the north of the regency.
