= Ruteng =

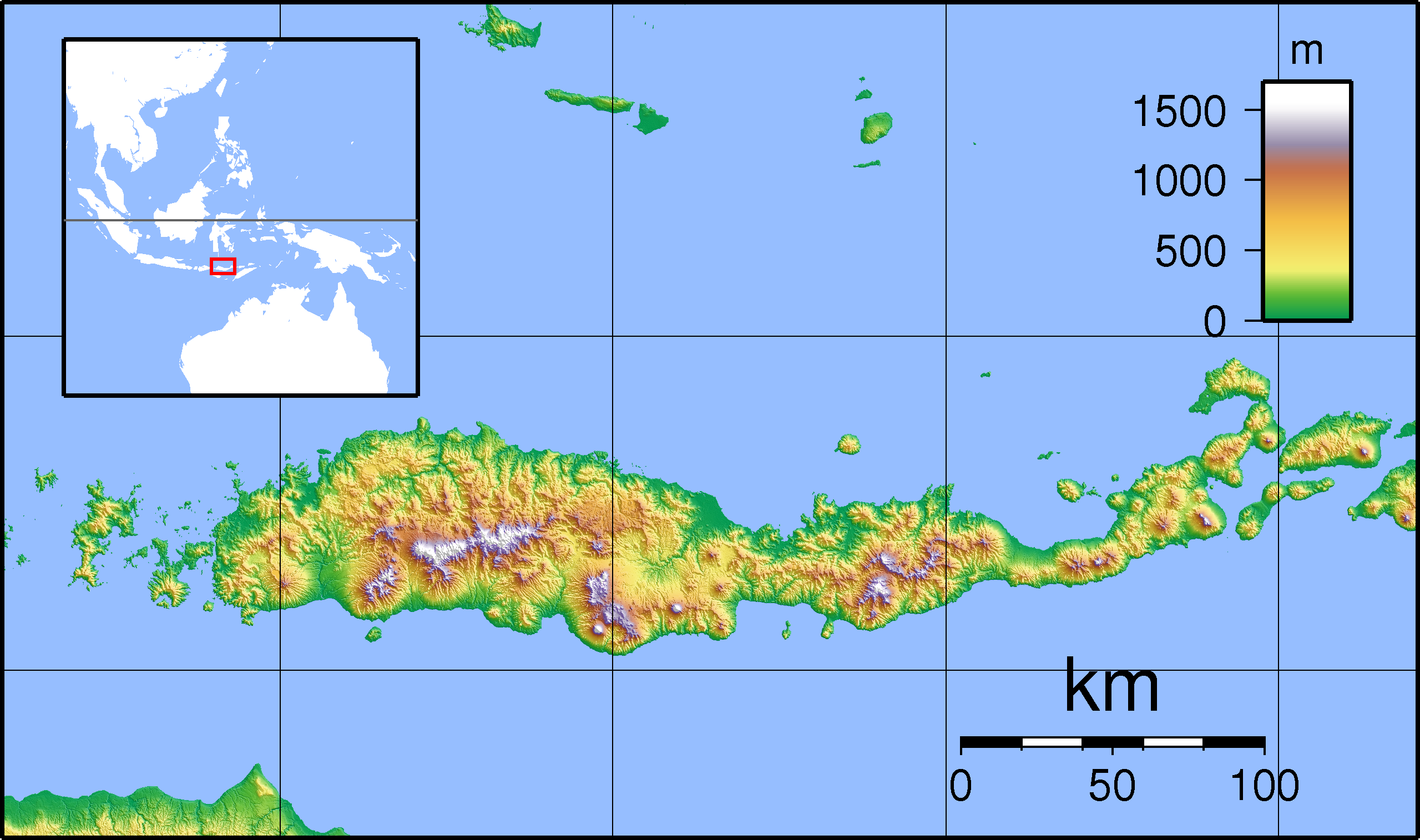
- Location in Indonesia Ruteng (Indonesia)
- Country: Indonesia
- Region: Lesser Sunda Islands
- Province: East Nusa Tenggara
- Regency: Manggarai

Area
  - Total: 38.81 km^{2} (14.98 sq mi)
- Elevation: 1,188 m (3,898 ft)

Population (mid 2025 estimate)
  - Total: 68,900
  - Density: 1,780/km^{2} (4,600/sq mi)
- Time zone: UTC+8 (WITA)

Ruteng is a town in the highlands towards the western end of Flores Island, Indonesia. It is the administrative capital of Manggarai Regency, serviced by the Frans Sales Lega Airport or Ruteng Airport. The population is predominantly Roman Catholic, but still preserve the ancient Manggarai custom of caci (whip fighting), which is usually practiced at weddings, and serves as a tourist attraction.

The Liang Bua archeological site is nearby, around 10 km to the north of Ruteng.

== Administration ==
The town of Ruteng is equivalent to the administrative district (kecamatan) of Langke Rembong, which covers an area of 38.81 km^{2}, and is composed of twenty urban villages (kelurahan); note that it does not include the administrative district named Ruteng, which is actually a separate and mainly rural district - with one kelurahan (Wae Belang) and eighteen rural villages (desa) - which lies to the west of Langke Rembong District and thus of the town.

The areas and populations (as at mid 2024) of the component kelurahan of Langke Rembong District are tabulated below, together with their postcodes.

Kode Wilayah	Name of kelurahan or desa	Area in km^{2}	Pop'n Estimate mid 2024	Post code
53.10.12.1001	Golo Dukal	2.02	3,885	86515
53.10.12.1002	Wali	1.88	5,054	86514
53.10.12.1003	Karot	3.57	4,668	86512
53.10.12.1004	Pitak	0.68	4,910	86513
53.10.12.1005	Lawir	0.28	1,671	86516
53.10.12.1006	Pau	2.21	8,350	86516
53.10.12.1007	Waso	3.67	3,804	86517
53.10.12.1008	Watu	4.65	5,363	86511
53.10.12.1009	Mbaumuku	0.40	3,127	86511
53.10.12.1010	Tenda	1.78	3,512	86518
53.10.12.1011	Carep	3.67	3,034	86519
53.10.12.1012	Bangka Nekang	0.54	2,529	86511
53.10.12.1013	Satar Tacik	1.42	5,243	86518
53.10.12.1014	Poco Mal	1.29	1,859	86518
53.10.12.1015	Compang Carep	0.54	1,095	86519
53.10.12.1016	Laci Carep	0.61	1,106	86519
53.10.12.1017	Tadong	2.00	1,828	86512
53.10.12.1018	Rowang	0.74	1,118	86517
53.10.12.1019	Bangka Leda	5.49	2,957	86515
53.10.12.1020	Compang Tuke	1.37	2,600	86514
53.10.12	Totals	38.81	67,813	

== Climate ==
Ruteng has a tropical rainforest climate (Köppen Af) that borders a subtropical highland climate (Cfb) and a tropical monsoon climate (Am). It features very warm afternoons and pleasant mornings year-round, moderate rainfall from June to August and heavy to very heavy rainfall in the remaining months.

Climate data for Ruteng
Month	Jan	Feb	Mar	Apr	May	Jun	Jul	Aug	Sep	Oct	Nov	Dec	Year
Mean daily maximum °C (°F)	24.9 (76.8)	24.6 (76.3)	25.1 (77.2)	25.2 (77.4)	24.7 (76.5)	24.0 (75.2)	23.9 (75.0)	24.5 (76.1)	25.4 (77.7)	26.3 (79.3)	26.0 (78.8)	25.3 (77.5)	25.0 (77.0)
Daily mean °C (°F)	20.2 (68.4)	20.0 (68.0)	20.3 (68.5)	20.1 (68.2)	19.6 (67.3)	18.8 (65.8)	18.3 (64.9)	18.5 (65.3)	19.4 (66.9)	20.5 (68.9)	20.9 (69.6)	20.5 (68.9)	19.8 (67.6)
Mean daily minimum °C (°F)	15.5 (59.9)	15.4 (59.7)	15.5 (59.9)	15.1 (59.2)	14.6 (58.3)	13.6 (56.5)	12.7 (54.9)	12.5 (54.5)	13.4 (56.1)	14.7 (58.5)	15.8 (60.4)	15.7 (60.3)	14.5 (58.2)
Average rainfall mm (inches)	541 (21.3)	482 (19.0)	495 (19.5)	306 (12.0)	213 (8.4)	98 (3.9)	71 (2.8)	80 (3.1)	142 (5.6)	284 (11.2)	394 (15.5)	458 (18.0)	3,564 (140.3)
Source: Climate-Data.org
