= June 1929 =

Month of 1929

| << | June 1929 | | | | | >> |
| Su | Mo | Tu | We | Th | Fr | Sa |
| | | | | | | 1 |
| 2 | 3 | 4 | 5 | 6 | 7 | 8 |
| 9 | 10 | 11 | 12 | 13 | 14 | 15 |
| 16 | 17 | 18 | 19 | 20 | 21 | 22 |
| 23 | 24 | 25 | 26 | 27 | 28 | 29 |
| 30 |

June 7, 1929: Vatican City becomes a sovereign nation

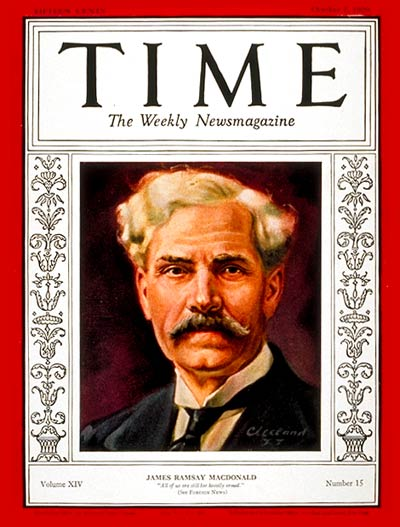
June 5, 1929: Ramsay MacDonald becomes Prime Minister of the United Kingdom for a second time

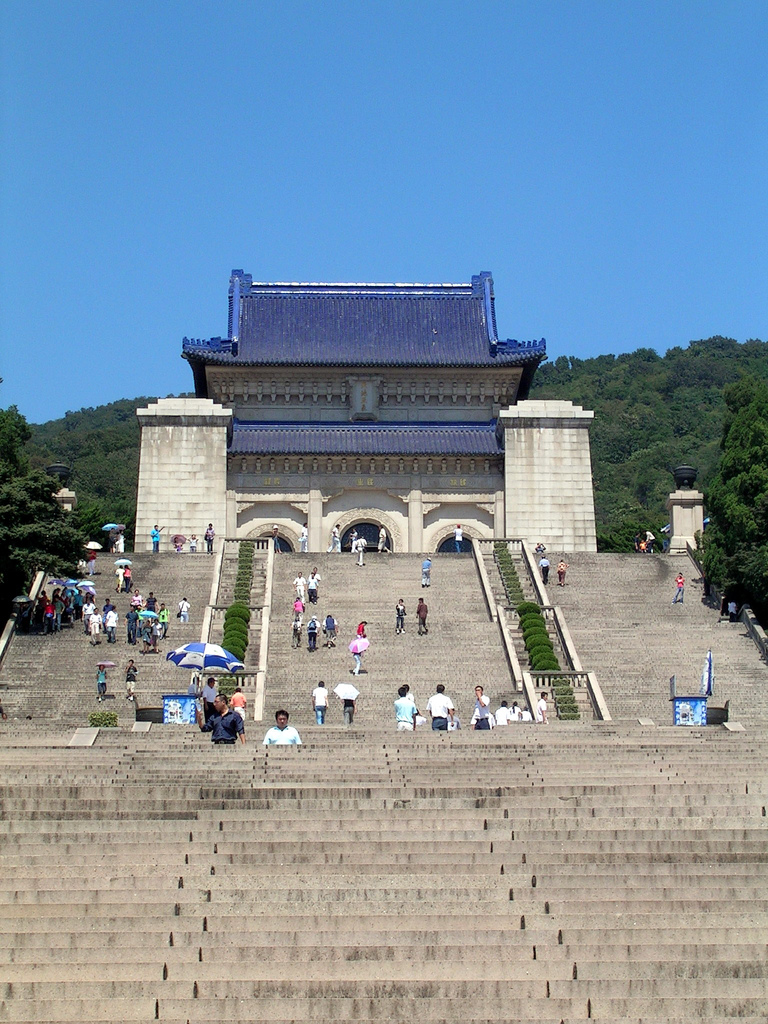
June 1, 1929: Sun Yat-sen interred in special mausoleum

The following events occurred in June 1929:

== Saturday, June 1, 1929 ==
- In an elaborate state ceremony, the remains of Sun Yat-sen were relocated from Beijing and buried in the newly constructed Sun Yat-sen Mausoleum in Nanjing.
- Born: Rodolfo Escalera, artist, in Gómez Palacio, Durango (d. 2000)

== Sunday, June 2, 1929 ==
- Eighteen nations signed a pact in London providing for uniform safety regulations of passenger ships at sea, including the requirement that ships carry enough lifeboats for all passengers.
- The Young Brothers shot and killed Town Marshal Mark Seworth Noe of the Republic, Missouri Police Department. They would kill six more law enforcement officers in the Young Brothers massacre on January 2, 1932.
- Died: Charles Moyer, 62, American labor leader

== Monday, June 3, 1929 ==
- The Treaty of Lima was signed, settling a territorial dispute between Peru and Chile.
- The U.S. Supreme Court decided Old Colony Trust Co. v. Commissioner.
- Actors Douglas Fairbanks, Jr. and Joan Crawford were married in New York. They would divorce in 1933.
- Born:
  - Werner Arber, Nobel Prize-winning microbiologist and geneticist, honored for his role in developing recombinant DNA technology; in Gränichen
  - Chuck Barris, U.S. television game show host and producer, known for creating The Dating Game and The Newlywed Game; in Philadelphia (d. 2017)

== Tuesday, June 4, 1929 ==
- Stanley Baldwin resigned as Prime Minister of the United Kingdom.
- Born: Karolos Papoulias, President of Greece from 2005 to 2015; in Ioannina (d. 2021)

== Wednesday, June 5, 1929 ==
- In a written letter, Pope Pius XI criticized recent statements by Benito Mussolini as "heretical, modernistic, ponderously erudite, full of errors and inexact." The pope was particularly angered by a statement in which Mussolini said that Christianity gained its worldwide influence by attaching itself to the pagan Roman Empire.
- Ramsay MacDonald of the Labour Party became British Prime Minister for the second time.

== Thursday, June 6, 1929 ==
- The Westlake exposition opened in Hangzhou, Republic of China.
- The surrealist short film Un Chien Andalou by Luis Buñuel and Salvador Dalí premiered in Paris.
- Born: Sunil Dutt, Indian actor, producer, director and politician, in Jhelum, Punjab, British Raj (d. 2005)

== Friday, June 7, 1929 ==
- Vatican City became an independent state as the Lateran Treaty went into effect.
- The Young Plan report was submitted to all governments concerned.
- During the Loray Mill Strike in Gastonia, North Carolina, 150 workers marched to the mill to call out the night shift, but were dispersed by police. Later that night, police confronted the nearby tent city and ordered its guards to hand over their weapons, causing another fight to break out. Chief of Police Orville Frank Aderholt was killed and several wounded.
- Born: John Turner, Prime Minister of Canada for 11 weeks in 1984; in Richmond, London, England (d. 2020)

== Saturday, June 8, 1929 ==
- Prime Minister Ramsay MacDonald made his first radio address to the British public, saying that international disarmament was a matter of "overshadowing importance" and stressing the need for dialogue with foreign powers.
- Blue Larkspur won the Belmont Stakes horse race.
- Leon Trotsky asked Britain for political asylum.
- Died: Bliss Carman, 68, Canadian poet

== Sunday, June 9, 1929 ==
- Actress Carmel Myers married her second husband, attorney Ralph Blum, in Temple B'nai B'rith in Los Angeles.
- Born: Jean Rougeau, Canadian professional wrestler, in Quebec (d. 1983)
- Died:
  - Louis Bennison, 44, silent film actor, killed actress Margaret Lawrence and himself in New York City.
  - Margaret Lawrence, 39, stage actress, murdered.

== Monday, June 10, 1929 ==
- Pope Pius XI promulgated 21 articles laying out the basic laws of Vatican City. The laws gave extensive powers to the pope that were transferred to the College of Cardinals during times when the papacy was vacant.
- Prince Charles of Belgium was fined 100 francs for failing to vote in provincial elections the previous day, in violation of the country's compulsory voting law.
- Born: E. O. Wilson, American sociobiologist, researcher and theorist, in Birmingham, Alabama (d. 2021)

== Tuesday, June 11, 1929 ==
- German Foreign Minister Gustav Stresemann accepted a French proposal to participate in an international conference to discuss an end to the occupation of the Rhineland.
- Ten German communists were sentenced to prison terms of three to twelve months for their participation in the Berlin May Day riots; three defendants were acquitted.
- Born:
  - Dolores Ashcroft-Nowicki, British occult writer
  - Frank Thomas, American baseball player, in Pittsburgh (d. 2023)
- Died: William Dickson Boyce, 70, American entrepreneur and founder of the Boy Scouts of America

== Wednesday, June 12, 1929 ==
- The war film The Four Feathers, starring William Powell and Fay Wray, premiered at the Criterion Theatre in New York City.
- Born: Anne Frank, whose book The Diary of Anne Frank brought her worldwide fame after her death in a Nazi concentration camp; in Frankfurt, Germany (d. 1945)

== Thursday, June 13, 1929 ==
- Soviet troops crossed the Chinese border in retaliation for raids on Soviet consulates.
- Ohio State University professor of veterinary medicine James H. Snook killed a student with whom he had been having an affair for the past three years. The sensational murder trial that followed would become the subject of national media attention.
- Born: Ralph McQuarrie, conceptual designer and illustrator, in Gary, Indiana (d. 2012)

== Friday, June 14, 1929 ==
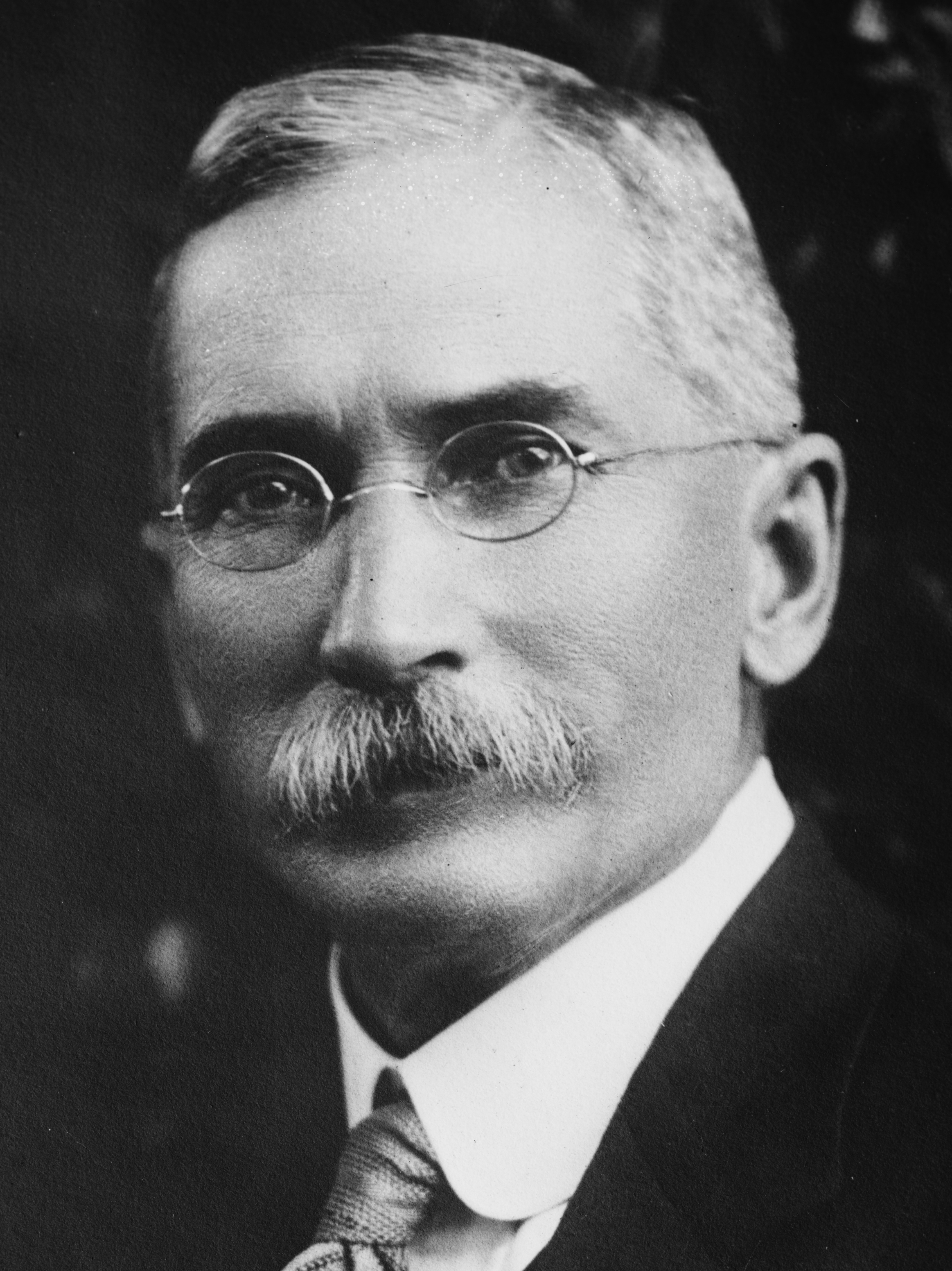
Prime Minister Hertzog

- The National Party of South Africa led by Prime Minister J. B. M. Hertzog, was declared the winner of an outright majority of the seats in the June 12 elections for the House of Assembly. Hertzog's government increased its share of the 148 seats from 63 to 78.
- Born: Johnny Wilson, Canadian ice hockey player and coach, in Kincardine, Ontario (d. 2011)

== Saturday, June 15, 1929 ==
- U.S. President Herbert Hoover signed the Agricultural Marketing Act into law.

== Sunday, June 16, 1929 ==
- Johnny Salo, a Finnish-born police officer from Passaic, New Jersey, won the second Trans-American Footrace from New York City to Los Angeles by just 2 minutes and 47 seconds, claiming a $25,000 prize. The race began on March 31 and covered 3,635 miles.
- Gibraltar switched to driving on the right side of the road rather than the left, with the change going into effect at 5:00 in the morning.
- Died: Bramwell Booth, 73, 2nd General of the Salvation Army

== Monday, June 17, 1929 ==
- Seven of the 13 people aboard an Imperial Airways airliner were killed when the plane crashed. The Handley Page W.10 twin engine plane, designated as City of Ottawa, plunged into the English Channel during a flight from London to Paris.
- 1929 Murchison earthquake, local New Zealand time, 16th June in Europe. Data from the earthquake was analyzed by Inge Lehmann.

== Tuesday, June 18, 1929 ==
- Charles G. Dawes, in his new post as the American ambassador to Britain, called for a naval disarmament conference during a speech in London.
- Kansas Joe McCoy and Memphis Minnie recorded the blues song When the Levee Breaks for Columbia Records, later to be famously covered by Led Zeppelin.
- The United States Congress enacted the Reapportionment Act of 1929. It froze the size of the United States House of Representatives. This is a significant event, given the wording of the first proposed amendment to the United States Constitution, the Congressional Apportionment Amendment. Before Congress altered the House version of the amendment by changing the word "less" to "more", the amendment stipulated that there not be less than one representative for every 50,000 persons. Currently there is, on average, less than one representative for every 700,000 persons.

== Wednesday, June 19, 1929 ==
- The American League-leading Philadelphia Athletics purchased the contract of veteran first baseman George Burns from the New York Yankees.
- In Manhattan, New York City, two Interborough Rapid Transit Company trains collided on the elevated tracks along Eighth Avenue, killing an IRT Company employee and injuring 34 passengers. Assistant Fire Marshal William F. Emerson of the New York City Fire Department Bureau of Fire Investigation died of heat stroke after climbing an 85-foot (26 m) ladder to investigate the crash site.
- Born: Thelma Barlow, English actress and writer, in Middlesbrough, North Riding of Yorkshire

== Thursday, June 20, 1929 ==
- A brawl broke out in the Argentine Chamber of Deputies during a debate over the recent dismissal of government employees. Deputies hurled inkwells and other objects, and two agreed to a pistol duel the next day.
- Corrections Employee Robert George Warnke of the Federal Bureau of Prisons was beaten to death with an iron bar by serial killer Carl Panzram, an inmate at the United States Penitentiary, Leavenworth, Kansas. Panzram had claimed to have committed 22 murders and had been involved in the murder of Superintendent Harry Minto of the Oregon Department of Corrections in September 1915. Panzram was subsequently hanged for Warnke's murder.
- The musical film The Hollywood Revue of 1929 premiered at Grauman's Chinese Theatre in Hollywood.
- Born:
  - Anne Weale, reporter and writer, in England (d. 2007)
  - Edith Windsor, American LGBT rights activist and plaintiff in the landmark 2013 case of United States v. Windsor; in Philadelphia (d. 2017)

== Friday, June 21, 1929 ==
- The Mexican government made peace with the Vatican, signing an accord in which Mexico agreed to revise its anti-clerical policies to allow churches to reopen while maintaining separation of church and state.
- The musical film Broadway Babies, starring Alice White, premiered at the Central Theatre in New York City.

== Saturday, June 22, 1929 ==
- Spanish aviator Ramón Franco and three other occupants of his plane disappeared near the Azores during a transatlantic flight attempt.
- Chief Justice Walter I. McCoy of the U.S. District Court for the District of Columbia ruled that Harry F. Sinclair could serve his six-month jail sentence for jury tampering concurrently with his three-month sentence for contempt of the senate's investigation of the Teapot Dome scandal.

== Sunday, June 23, 1929 ==
- The French city of Verdun held a celebration of its reconstruction, thirteen years after being heavily damaged in the crucial battle of the World War. A large victory monument sculpted by Jean Boucher was formally inaugurated in a ceremony attended by President Gaston Doumergue, Prime Minister Raymond Poincaré and general Philippe Pétain.
- Born: June Carter Cash, entertainer, in Maces Spring, Virginia (d. 2003)

== Monday, June 24, 1929 ==
- Tens of thousands of Londoners lined the streets for the funeral procession of Salvation Army General Bramwell Booth.
- In Italy, official census figures reported a population of 41,173,000 in 1928, an increase of 406,000 over the previous year. That increase in population was promoted by Benito Mussolini's government as a sign that his campaign to increase the Italian birth rate was succeeding.

== Tuesday, June 25, 1929 ==
- President Hoover signed the Boulder Canyon Project Act, authorizing the expenditure of $165 million for the construction of the Boulder Dam.

== Wednesday, June 26, 1929 ==
- Japan ratified the Kellogg-Briand Pact.
- Born: Milton Glaser, graphic designer, in New York City (d. 2020)
- Died: Amandus Adamson, 73, Estonian sculptor

== Thursday, June 27, 1929 ==
- Max Schmeling beat Paulino Uzcudun by 15-round decision in a boxing card before a crowd of 40,000 in Yankee Stadium.
- A color television demonstration, using images of flags, was given to the news reporters by the Bell Laboratories in New York.

== Friday, June 28, 1929 ==
- On the tenth anniversary of the signing of the Treaty of Versailles, Germany observed a day of mourning as government buildings flew their flags at half-mast, while Der Stahlhelm and other nationalist groups staged massive demonstrations. A proclamation signed by President Paul von Hindenburg and the entire cabinet was published denouncing the treaty. Referring to Article 231, it stated that "Germany signed the treaty without acknowledging thereby that the German people were responsible for the war. This reproach haunts our people and disturbs mutual confidence among nations. We know we are expressing the unanimous views of the Germans in casting from us the charge that Germany was solely to blame for the war, and are expressing their firm confidence in the idea that the future belongs to real peace resting not on the dictates of force, but on agreements and honest understandings among free and equal nations."
- The Deutsche Physikalische Gesellschaft (German Physical Society) awarded the first Max Planck Medals, honoring extraordinary achievements in theoretical physics. The first recipients were Albert Einstein and Max Planck himself.
- Died: Edward Carpenter, 84, English poet and philosopher

== Saturday, June 29, 1929 ==
- At 12:00 a.m., Town Sergeant Harry Valentine Smeeman of the Ashland, Virginia Police Department was shot and killed on duty. Of the two suspects identified by the investigation, one was acquitted and the other was never found.
- Ramón Franco and three companions, missing for a week, were found alive floating off the Azores by a British plane.
- The drama film River of Romance was released.

== Sunday, June 30, 1929 ==
- William Grover-Williams won the French Grand Prix.
- Bobby Jones won his third U.S. Open golf title.
