= September 1929 =

Month of 1929

<<	September 1929					>>
Su	Mo	Tu	We	Th	Fr	Sa
1	2	3	4	5	6	7
8	9	10	11	12	13	14
15	16	17	18	19	20	21
22	23	24	25	26	27	28
29	30

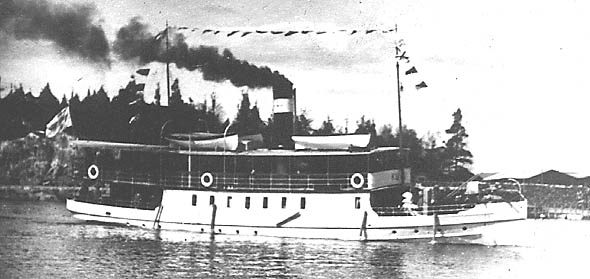
September 7, 1929: Sinking of the SS Kuru kills 136 people in Finland

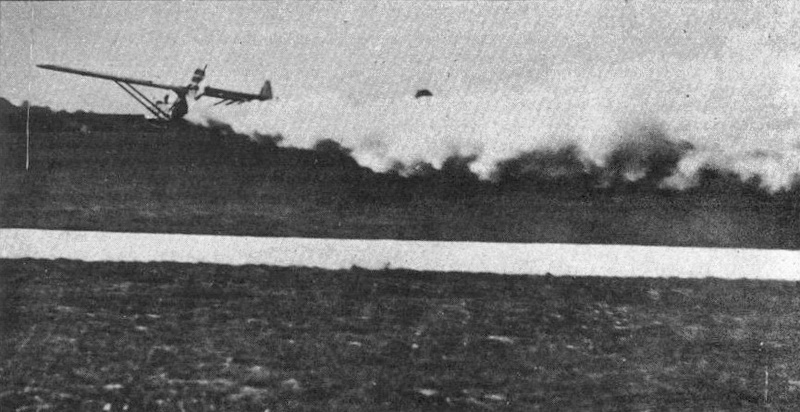
September 30, 1929: The world's first rocket powered-plane, Germany's RAK-1, piloted by Fritz von Opel

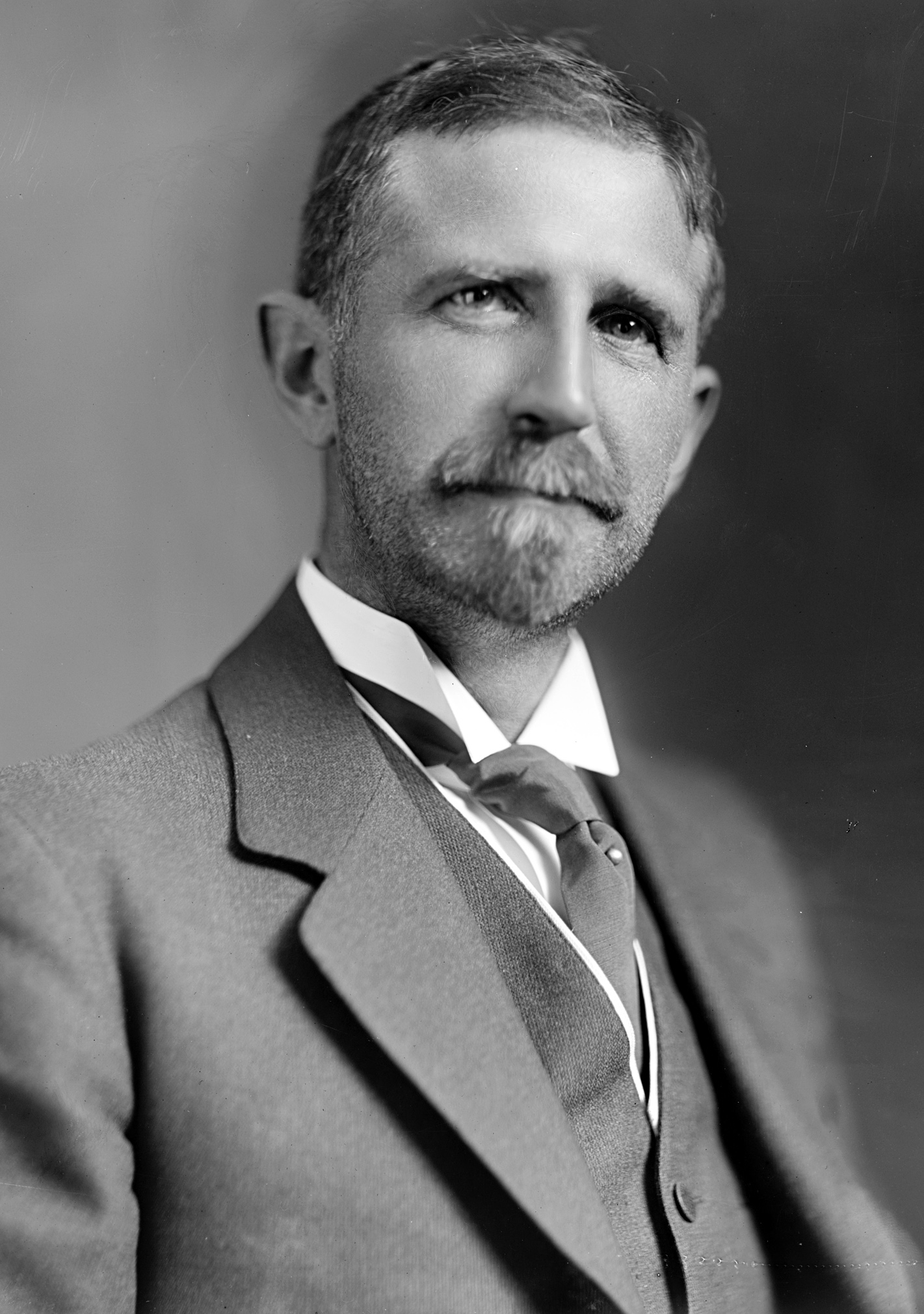
September 5, 1929: Economist Roger Babson warns investors, "Sooner or later, a crash is coming.."

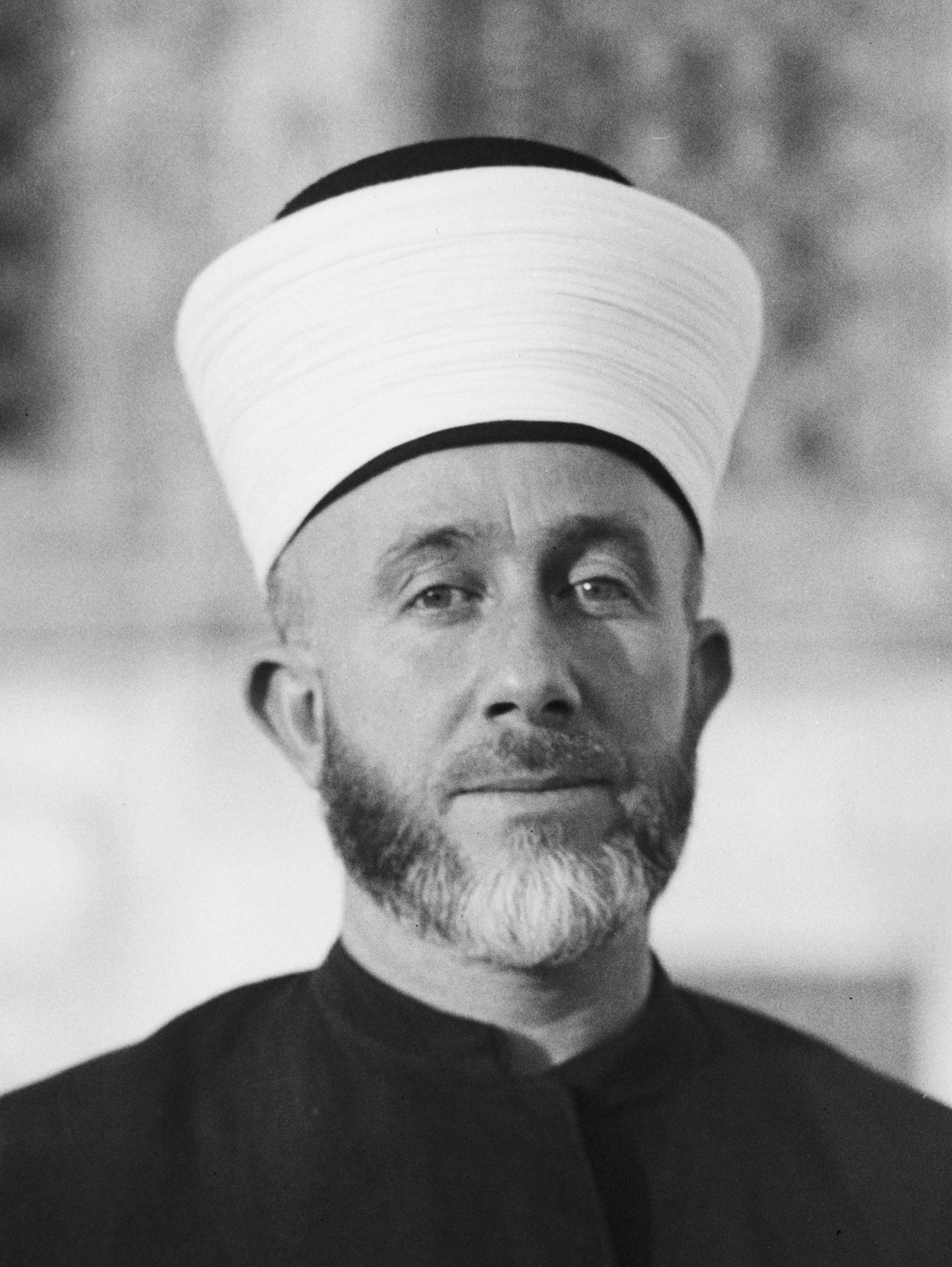
September 2, 1929: Grand Mufti Amin al-Husseini of Jerusalem warns British not to create a Jewish state in Palestine

The following events occurred in September 1929:

== September 1, 1929 (Sunday) ==
- A bomb exploded at 4 a.m. at the Reichstag building in Berlin. Windows were shattered but there were no injuries.
- Chinese foreign minister Wang Zhengting said that China would not consent to the Soviet condition to replace the chairman of the Chinese Eastern Railway amid reports of resumed fighting along the border.

== September 2, 1929 (Monday) ==
- Grand Mufti of Jerusalem Haj Amin al-Husseini warned that Palestine and Arabia could not regain peace unless Britain abandoned its policy of making Palestine a national home for Jews. He explained that the reasons for recent violence had little to do with the Wailing Wall but actually went back to the Balfour Declaration of 1917.
- Belgium's Department of National Defense issued orders for the Belgian force of occupation in the Rhineland to leave by November 30.
- Died: Paul Leni, 44, German filmmaker, died of sepsis following an untreated tooth infection.

== September 3, 1929 (Tuesday) ==
- Britain appointed a four-person committee to investigate the conflict between Jews and Arabs in Palestine.
- September 1929 Philippines typhoon - A typhoon struck the Philippines, causing between 50 and 100 deaths and doing about 20 million pesos worth of damage over the next several days.
- The Dow Jones Industrial Average reached its peak for the decade of the 1920s at 386 points.
- The westbound Transcontinental Air Transport passenger plane City of San Francisco crashed on Mount Taylor in New Mexico, killing all 8 aboard. The plane had diverted its course to avoid a storm.
- British Prime Minister Ramsay MacDonald gave a speech to the League of Nations Assembly in Geneva outlining his government's policies. MacDonald said that Britain would "do everything possible to hasten the preparations for a disarmament conference." MacDonald suggested that if a twenty-point document on naval disarmament were to be outlined between Britain and the United States, "only about three of the twenty" points would be considered outstanding.
- The stage musical Sweet Adeline with music by Jerome Kern and lyrics by Oscar Hammerstein II opened at Hammerstein's Theatre on Broadway.
- Rachele Mussolini gave birth to her fifth child with Benito Mussolini, a daughter named Anna Maria.
- Born:
  - James "Whitey" Bulger, American organized crime boss, of the Winter Hill Gang; in Boston (d. 2018)
  - Armand Vaillancourt, Canadian Quebecois artist, in Black Lake, Quebec, known for creating the Vaillancourt Fountain in San Francisco
- Died:
  - William Emmett Dever, 67, Mayor of Chicago from 1923 to 1927
  - Owen Thomas Edgar, 98, the last surviving U.S. veteran of the Mexican–American War, who served in the U.S. Navy as a 2nd-class apprentice

== September 4, 1929 (Wednesday) ==
- The explosion of a powder mill in a bomb factory, near Brescia in Italy, killed 17 people.
- Born: Thomas Eagleton, U.S. Senator for Missouri and 1972 Democratic Party nominee for Vice President who was forced off the ticket after disclosing prior treatment for clinical depression; in St. Louis (d. 2007)

== September 5, 1929 (Thursday) ==
- French Prime Minister Aristide Briand called for a United States of Europe, telling the League of Nations Assembly in Geneva that a "federal tie must exist between peoples grouped geographically like the peoples of Europe." His plan included the formation of an international police force to uphold the Kellogg-Briand Pact as well as loan guarantees to aid any nation forced into war or threatened by war.
- American business theorist Roger Babson gave a business conference speech in Wellesley, Massachusetts, saying, "More people are borrowing and speculating today than ever in our history. Sooner or later, a crash is coming, and it may be terrific."
- Born: Bob Newhart (George Robert Newhart), American comedian, and TV and film actor known for his comic monologues; star of The Bob Newhart Show and Newhart; in Oak Park, Illinois(d. 2024)

== September 6, 1929 (Friday) ==
- British Foreign Affairs Secretary Arthur Henderson proposed before the League of Nations Assembly that the League Covenant be revised to bring it in line with the Kellogg-Briand Pact, pointing out that Article 12 maintained a nation's right to wage war.
- Born: Charles Calvin Rogers, United States Army officer and Medal of Honor recipient; in Claremont, West Virginia (d. 1990)
- Died: Seymour Sharkey, 82, British physician

== September 7, 1929 (Saturday) ==
- The sinking of the Finnish steamship SS Kuru in Lake Näsijärvi killed 136 passengers and crew.
- Jews were allowed to pray again at the Wailing Wall under the protection of seven Arab policemen as Palestine returned to a state of calm.
- British pilot Richard Waghorn won the 1929 Schneider Trophy race, setting a new world flying speed record of 328.6 miles per hour.
- The wreckage of the City of San Francisco passenger plane was spotted on the south slope of Mount Taylor by a transport plane.

== September 8, 1929 (Sunday) ==
- Actress Patsy Ruth Miller and director Tay Garnett were married in California.

== September 9, 1929 (Monday) ==
- Representatives of 28 nations attended a luncheon to hear Aristide Briand's proposal for a United States of Europe. Briand was named to draft a memorandum on the scheme for further study. "We have laid the cornerstone of a European confederation", Briand told the media after the meeting. "It was a good cornerstone."

== September 10, 1929 (Tuesday) ==
- British pilot A. H. Oriebar set a new world flying speed record of 355.8 miles per hour, using the same Supermarine S.6 flown by Richard Waghorn in the Schneider Trophy race that set the previous record a mere three days earlier.
- Born: Arnold Palmer, golfer, in Latrobe, Pennsylvania (d. 2016)

== September 11, 1929 (Wednesday) ==
- Fourteen members of the crew of the Belgian cargo ship Estella died after the freighter collided with a German lumber ship in the Scheldt River and sank.
- The Soviet Army crossed the border with China from Pogranichny and advanced 40 miles into the Heilongjiang Province.

== September 12, 1929 (Thursday) ==
- Benito Mussolini relinquished seven of his eight cabinet posts, retaining only the Ministry of Interior. New appointees to fill the vacancies included Dino Grandi as Foreign Affairs Minister and Italo Balbo as Minister of Aviation.
- The musical drama film The Great Gabbo, starring Erich von Stroheim, opened at the Selwyn Theatre in New York City.
- Died: Rainis (pen name for Jānis Pliekšāns), 64, Latvian poet and playwright

== September 13, 1929 (Friday) ==
- Twelve people were killed and 15 injured in Italy in a gasoline explosion at Parma.
- U.S. singer Bessie Smith released her version of the blues standard "Nobody Knows You When You're Down and Out".

== September 14, 1929 (Saturday) ==
- The British Army began its withdrawal from Germany of its remaining troops from the occupied Rhineland.
- The Philadelphia Athletics clinched the American League pennant with a 5–0 victory over the Chicago White Sox.

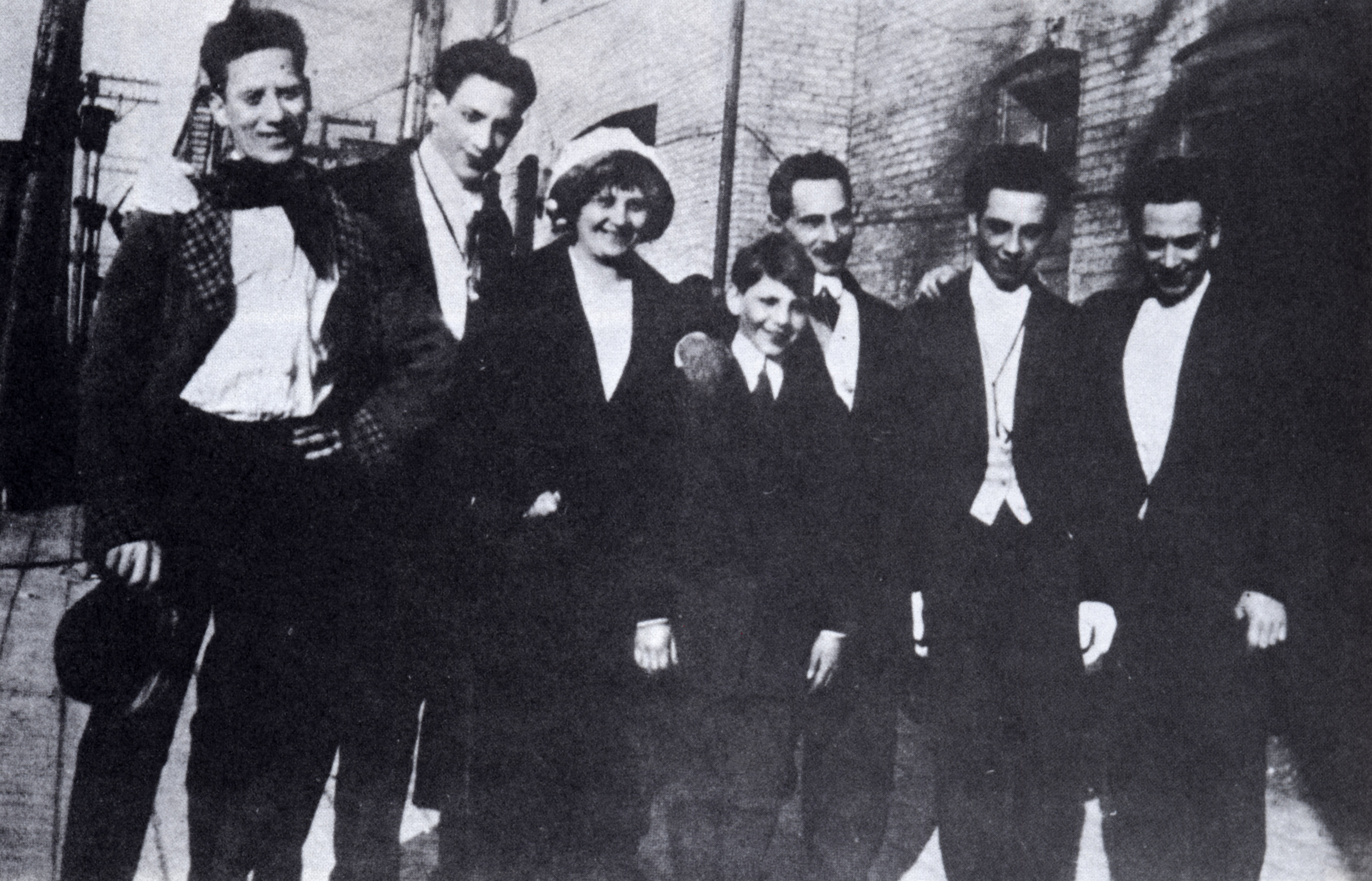
Minnie and Sam Marx with their five sons in 1915

- Died:
  - Minnie Marx, 63, mother and manager of the Marx Brothers
  - Ella Mae Wiggins, 28, American union organizer and balladeer, was shot and killed during the Loray Mill Strike

== September 15, 1929 (Sunday) ==
- Seven men were charged in the fatal shooting of Ella Mae Wiggins. Five would be put on trial, but acquitted of all charges the following March.
- Born: Murray Gell-Mann, U.S. physicist and 1969 Nobel laureate, in Manhattan, New York (d. 2019)

== September 16, 1929 (Monday) ==
- The United States and Britain formally invited Japan, France and Italy to a naval disarmament conference scheduled to start in the second week of January 1930.
- 23 were killed and 21 injured in an explosion at the Petite Rosselle coal mine near Strasbourg in France.
- Born: Maxine Kline, American baseball player for the AAGPBL, 1954 leader (for the Fort Wayne Daisies) in games won; in North Adams, Michigan (d. 2022)

== September 17, 1929 (Tuesday) ==
- Wildfires in Ventura County, California, did an estimated $3 million in damages to oil company buildings, derricks and other infrastructure.
- Another typhoon hit the Philippines, striking the islands of Catanduanes and Rapu-rapu over the next day killing at least 26 people .
- Fiorello H. LaGuardia won primary elections for the Republican nomination for Mayor of New York City.

== September 18, 1929 (Wednesday) ==
- U.S. President Herbert Hoover made a radio address from the White House on international peace and arms reduction. Hoover stated that "preparedness must not exceed the barest necessity for defense or it becomes a threat of aggression against others and thus a cause of fear and animosity of the world." Hoover said that proposals to limit naval armaments "would preserve our national defenses and yet would relieve the backs of those who toil from gigantic expenditures and the world from the hate and fear which flows from the rivalry in building warships."
- The Chicago Cubs clinched the National League pennant when the Pittsburgh Pirates were eliminated by losing 5–4 to the Boston Braves.
- The Preston Sturges romantic comedy play Strictly Dishonorable opened at the Avon Theatre on Broadway.

== September 19, 1929 (Thursday) ==
- The National City Bank disclosed plans to merge with the Corn Exchange Bank, which would make it the largest financial institution in the Western hemisphere. This merger fell through after the Wall Street Crash.

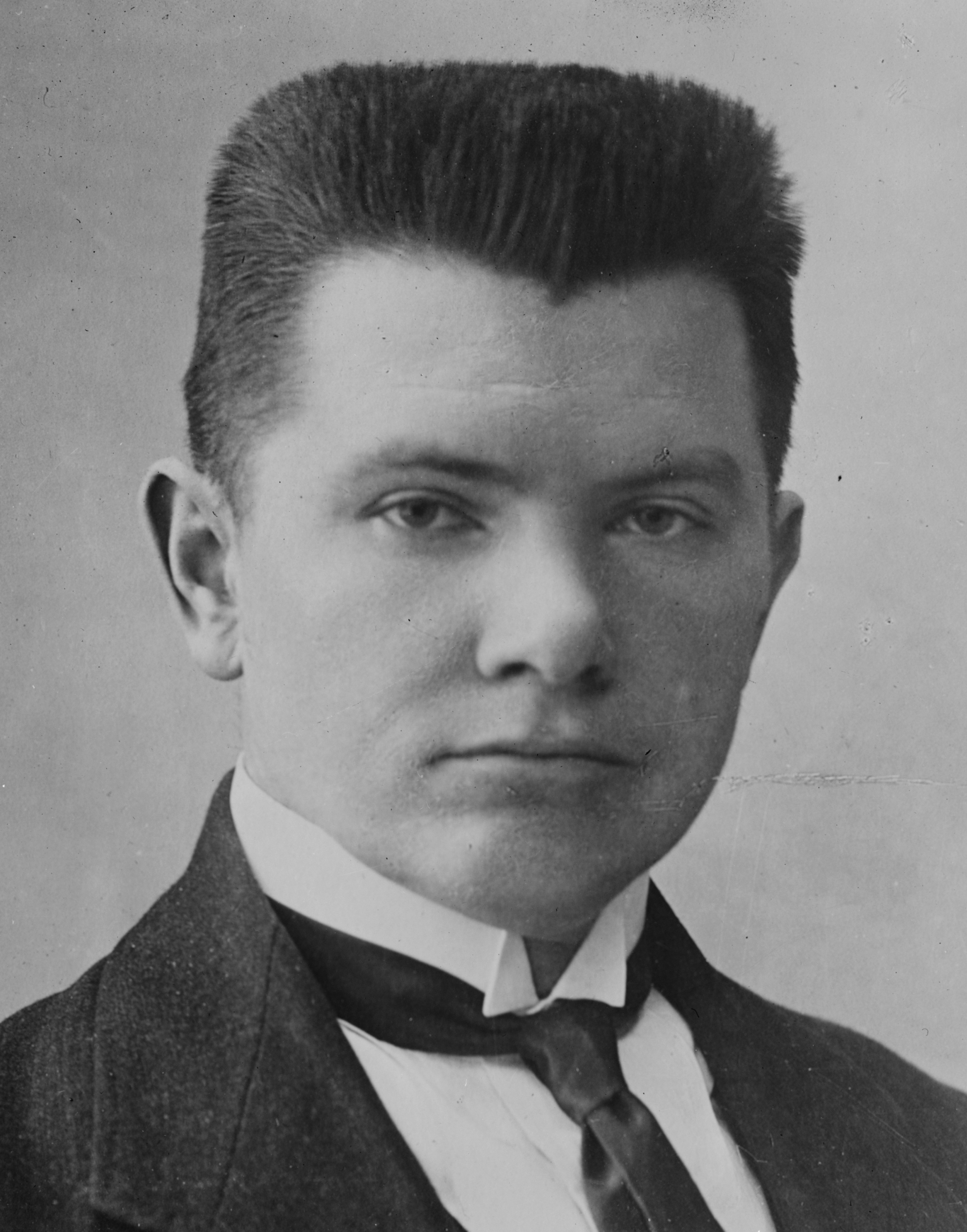
Voldemaras

- Augustinas Voldemaras resigned as the Prime Minister of Lithuania, forced from power by President Antanas Smetona.
- Born: Mel Stewart, actor, director and musician, in Cleveland, Ohio (d. 2002)

== September 20, 1929 (Thursday) ==
- In Detroit, a fire at the Study Club dance hall killed 20 people and injured more than 50.
- Died: Harvey Marion LaFollette, 71, American industrialist, former Superintendent of the Indiana Department of Education, later the co-founder of the LaFollette Coal, Iron, and Railway Company and the city of LaFollette, Tennessee

== September 21, 1929 (Saturday) ==
- Britain withdrew a controversial disarmament resolution from the League of Nations proposing limitations on trained army reserves.
- Born: Sándor Kocsis, Hungarian soccer football striker and national team member; in Budapest (died of fall from building, 1979)

== September 22, 1929 (Sunday) ==
- Benito Mussolini announced the creation of a new government department for physical education in Fascist Italy.
- Joseph Goebbels was among those arrested by Berlin authorities after shots were fired from a car riding in a procession of Nazis when onlookers hissed and jeered the demonstration. Empty cartridges were found in the car Goebbels was riding in.
- Born: Hédi Váradi, Hungarian actress; in Újpest (d. 1987)
- Died: Elton "Ice Box" Chamberlain, 61, American major league baseball player

== September 23, 1929 (Monday) ==
- The $1.5 million, 21,000-seat St. Louis Arena opened with a dedicatory banquet.
- John Coolidge, the first son of ex-U.S. president Calvin Coolidge, married Florence Trumbull in Plainville, Connecticut.
- Died: Richard Adolf Zsigmondy, 64, Austro-Hungarian-born German chemist and 1925 Nobel Prize laureate

== September 24, 1929 (Tuesday) ==
- German nationalists opened a campaign seeking a referendum to renounce the Young Plan. National People's Party leader Alfred Hugenberg spoke in Berlin before 20,000 supporters, calling the Young Plan "a piece of flagrant dishonesty, unworthy of honorable people." Two sons of the former kaiser, August Wilhelm and Oskar, were present.
- Shops and residences in Florida were boarded up in anticipation of a hurricane.
- Died: Prince Mahidol Adulyadej, 37, Thai physician and public health reformer, half-brother of King Vajiravudh, father of King Ananda Mahidol and of King Bhumibol Adulyadej, died of kidney disease

== September 25, 1929 (Wednesday) ==
- Austrian Chancellor Ernst Streeruwitz and his government resigned.
- Czechoslovakia's Prime Minister Jan Černý and his coalition government announced their resignations. New elections for the Chamber of Deputies and the Senate were then called for October 27.
- The island of Andros in The Bahamas was hit by the 1929 Bahamas hurricane, causing 25 deaths and extensive damage.
- Born:
  - Barbara Walters, pioneering broadcast journalist and anchor, known for the Today show, 20/20, the ABC Evening News and The View; in Boston (d. 2022)
  - Ronnie Barker, English TV actor and comedian, co-host of the long-running show The Two Ronnies from 1971 to 1987; in Bedford (d. 2005)

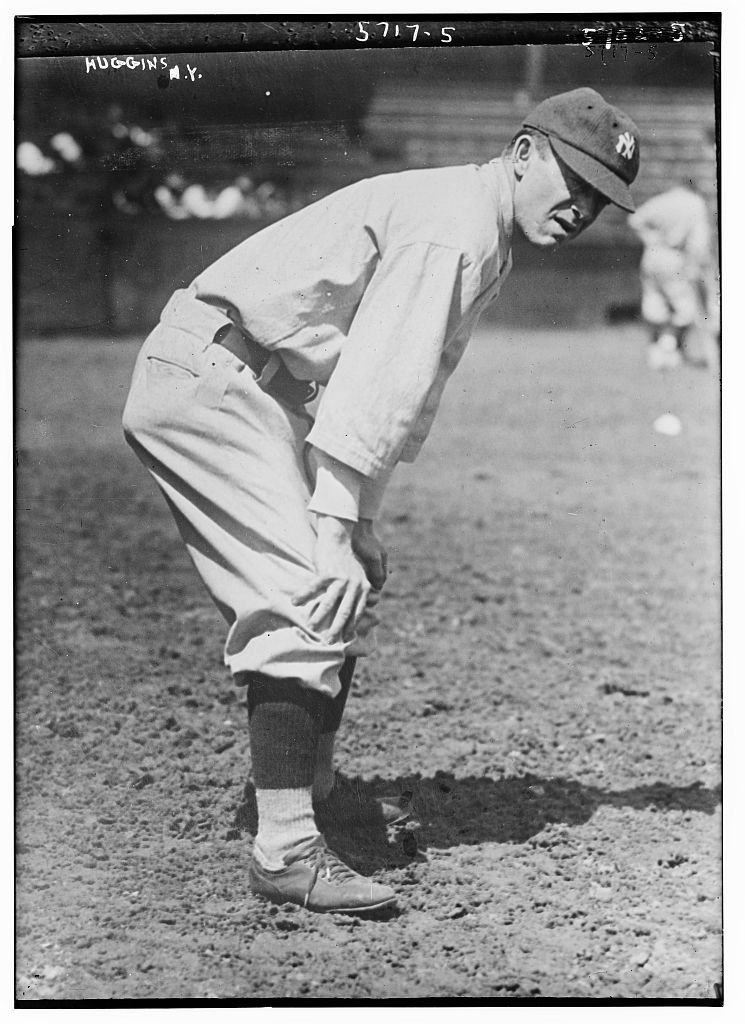
Huggins

- Died: Miller Huggins, 50, American baseball manager who guided the New York Yankees to six American League pennants and three World Series championships between 1921 and 1928, died from pyaemia from a staph infection, one week after taking a leave of absence from his team to enter the hospital; his Yankees won, 11 to 10 over the Red Sox that day under assistant manager Art Fletcher. He would be elected to the National Baseball Hall of Fame 35 years later.

== September 26, 1929 (Thursday) ==
- Jack Sharkey knocked out Tommy Loughran in the third round at Yankee Stadium to win boxing's American Heavyweight Title.
- Johann Schober became Chancellor of Austria for the third time.
- CEPSA (Compañía Española de Petróleos, S.A.) a multinational oil and natural gas drilling and refinery company, was founded in Spain by Francisco Recasens.

== September 27, 1929 (Friday) ==
- The Ernest Hemingway novel A Farewell to Arms was published.
- British Prime Minister Ramsay MacDonald boarded the Berengeria at Southampton and departed for the United States to meet with President Hoover on disarmament.

== September 28, 1929 (Saturday) ==
- The Bahamas hurricane passed over Long Key, Florida. The southern part of the Florida peninsula was hit by strong winds but damage was moderate.
- Alfred Hugenberg and Franz Seldte formally submitted a bill to German Interior Minister Carl Severing, calling for a referendum "against the enslavement of the German people". The referendum, if passed, would renounce Article 231 of the Treaty of Versailles and all financial burdens or obligations derived from the clause, including the Young Plan. The bill was accompanied by a petition with 5,000 signatures.
- In India, Child Marriage Restraint Act was passed, which says that no man below 18 or women below 16 could marry. Also known as Sharda Act, but later the age limit raised up to 21 for boys and 18 for girls.
- Born: Lata Mangeshkar, Indian singer and film actress; in Indore, British India (d. 2022)

== September 29, 1929 (Sunday) ==
Bellonte and Costes

- Two days after taking off from Paris–Le Bourget Airport, French pilot Dieudonné Costes and navigator Maurice Bellonte set a new aviation distance record by flying non-stop to Tsitsihar, China in the Breguet 19, a distance of about 4,846 miles.
- The Bridge Murder occurred in Kansas City, Missouri, when housewife Mertyle Adkins Bennett murdered her husband John over a game of contract bridge.
- The Brazilian football club Esporte Clube Itaúna was founded.
- Died: Tanaka Giichi, 65, general and 26th Prime Minister of Japan

== September 30, 1929 (Monday) ==
- Rival armies of Nadir Khan and Habibullāh Kalakāni battled in the Logar Valley for control of Kabul in the Afghan civil war.
- At Frankfurt, Fritz von Opel made the world's first flight in a rocket-propelled plane, the RAK.1, for about a mile and a quarter at an average altitude of 49 feet (15 m). Opel crashed upon landing but was unhurt.
- Born: Abdellatief Abouheif, marathon swimming champion, in Alexandria, Egypt (d. 2003)
