= May 1929 =

Month of 1929

<<	May 1929					>>
Su	Mo	Tu	We	Th	Fr	Sa
			1	2	3	4
5	6	7	8	9	10	11
12	13	14	15	16	17	18
19	20	21	22	23	24	25
26	27	28	29	30	31

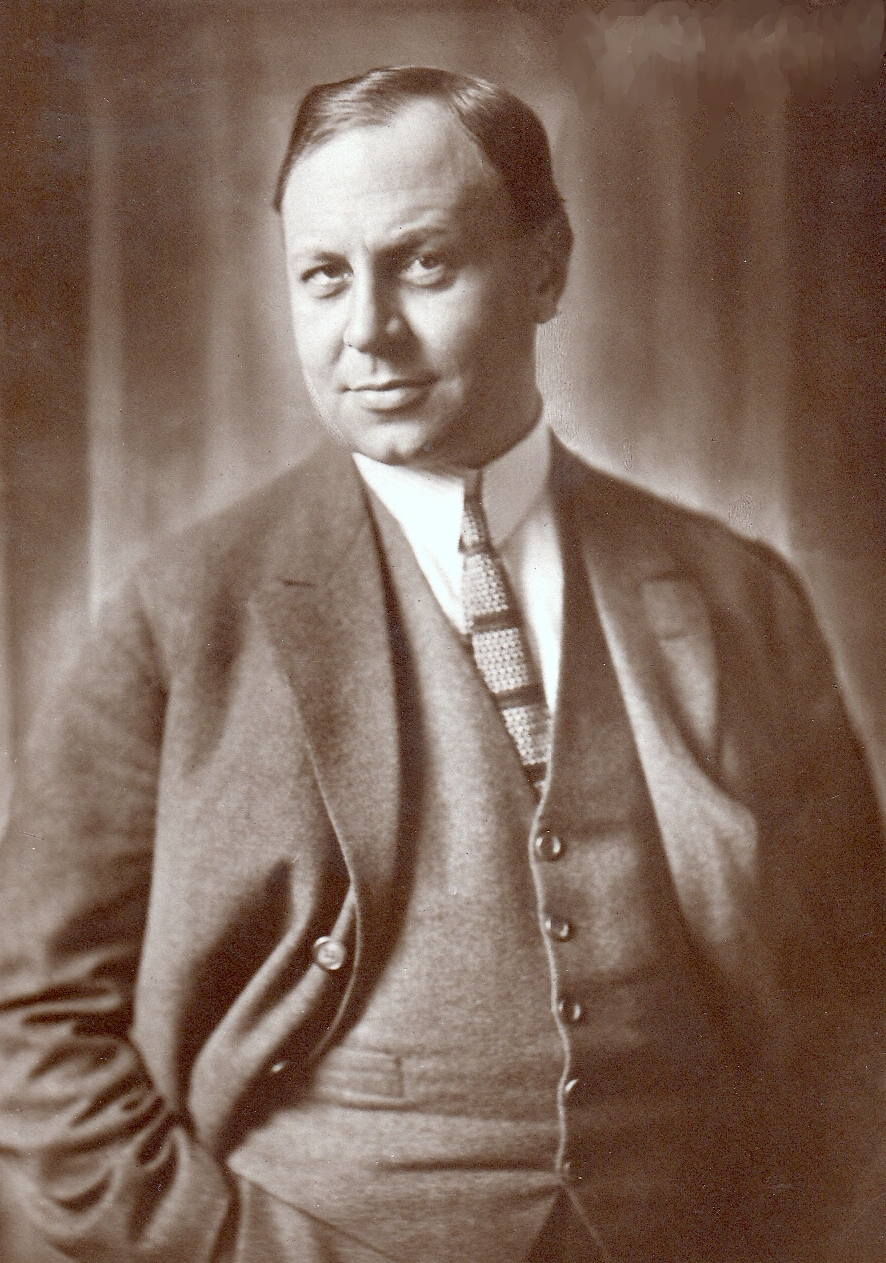
May 16, 1929: Actor Emil Jannings receives the first-ever Academy Award

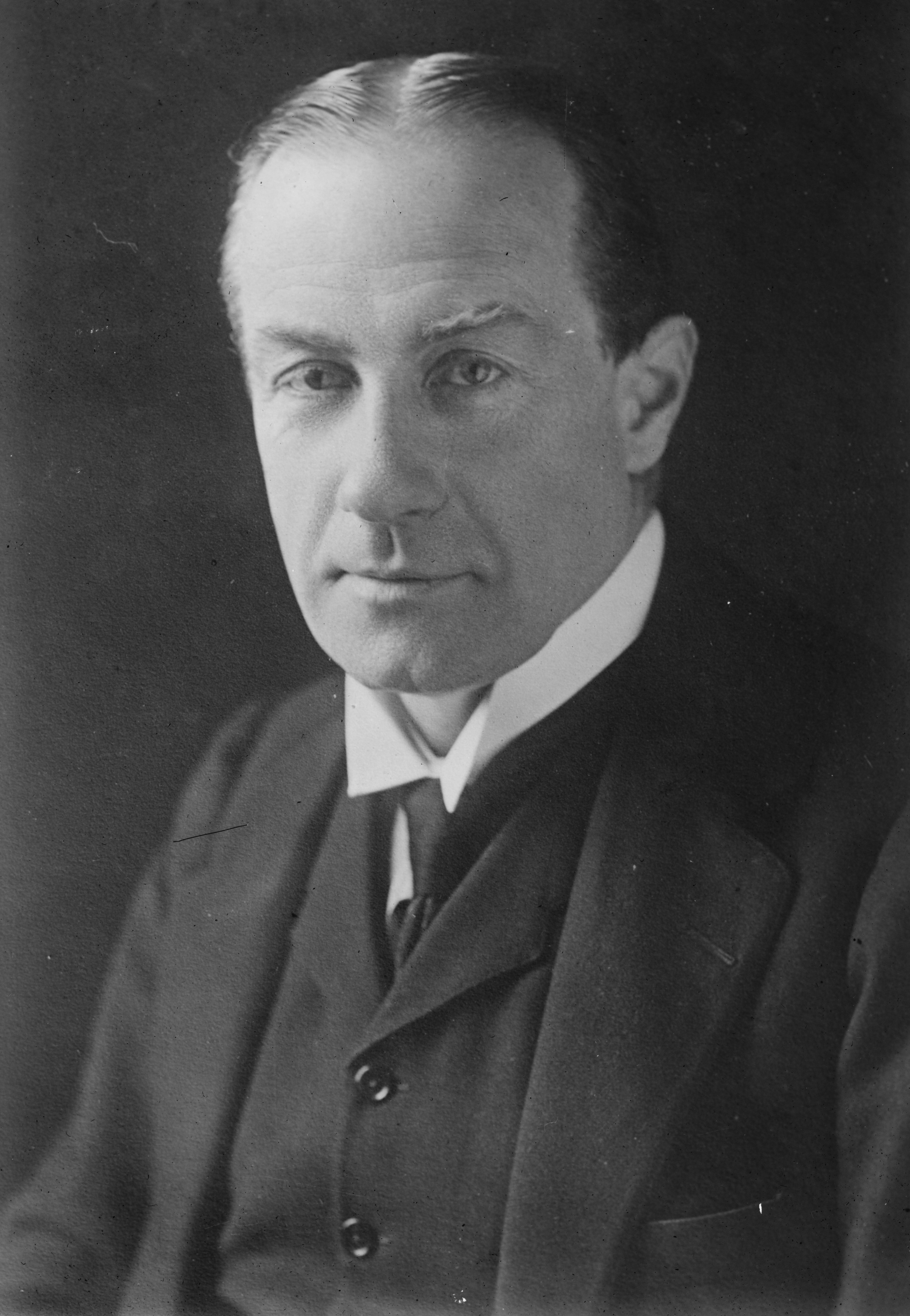
May 30, 1929: British Prime Minister Stanley Baldwin and the Tories lose their majority in the House of Commons

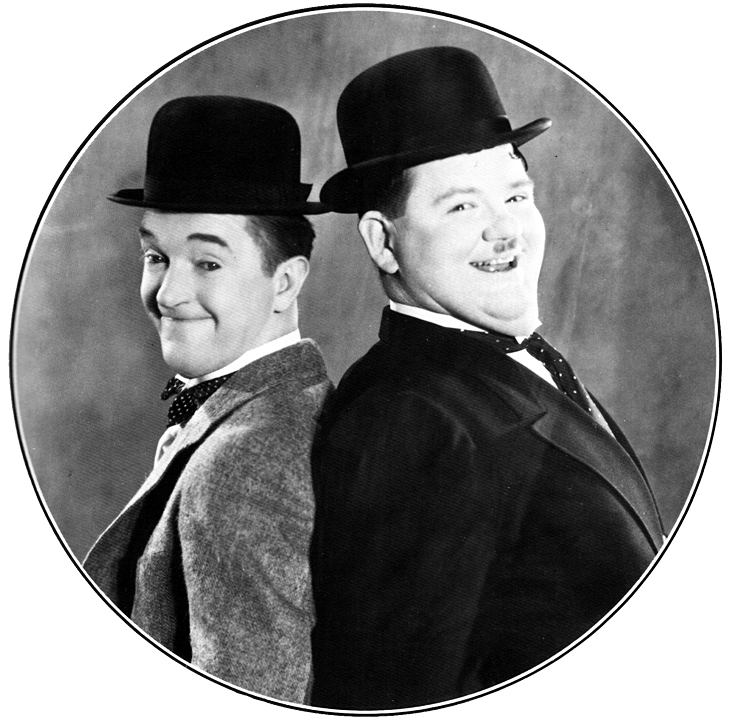
May 4, 1929: Laurel and Hardy make the transition to sound

The following events occurred in May 1929:

== Wednesday, May 1, 1929 ==
- A 7.2 magnitude earthquake killed at least 3,250 people in Iran and Turkmenistan.
- Thirty-two people were killed and 700 arrested in Berlin during clashes between 8,000 communists and police. The fighting broke out when communists held May Day demonstrations in defiance of a police order to refrain from doing so.
- Born: Ralf Dahrendorf, German sociologist, philosopher and politician; in Hamburg (d. 2009)

== Thursday, May 2, 1929 ==
- Tornadoes swept through the Appalachian Mountains killing 42 people and injuring 323 others. Thirteen of the people killed were students and a teacher in a schoolhouse in Rye Cove, Virginia.
- Born:
  - Édouard Balladur, Prime Minister of France 1993 to 1995, in İzmir, Turkey
  - Link Wray (Fred Lincoln Wray Jr.), American rock musician; in Dunn, North Carolina (d. 2005)
- Died: Charalambos Tseroulis, 49, Greek general

== Friday, May 3, 1929 ==
- Berlin Police stormed barricades erected by communists as rioting continued in the city for a third day.

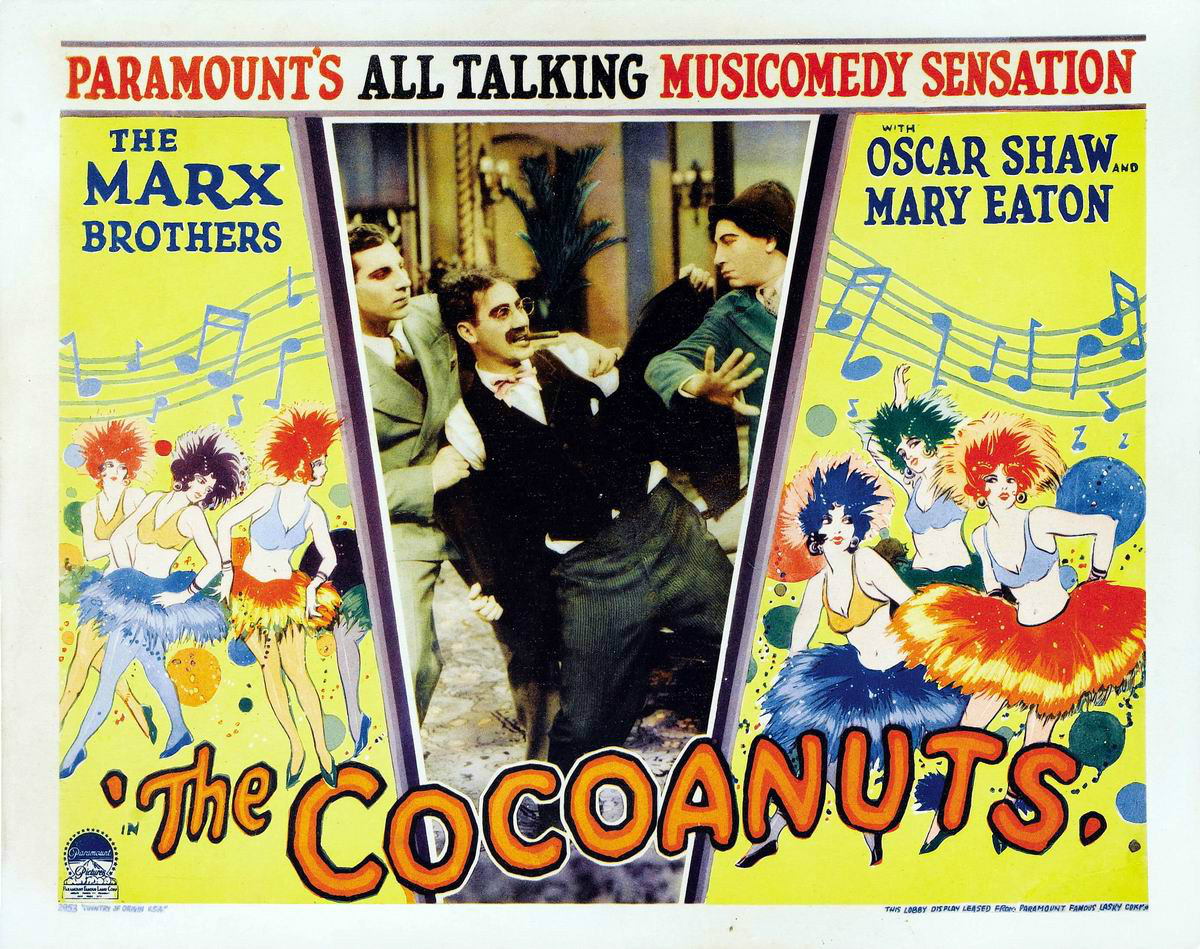
Lobby card for The Cocoanuts

- The musical comedy film The Cocoanuts, starring the Marx Brothers in their first feature-length movie, was released.

== Saturday, May 4, 1929 ==
- Ernst Streeruwitz became Chancellor of Austria.
- The U.S. Supreme Court ordered the District of Columbia Supreme Court to enforce the jail sentence upon Harry F. Sinclair for contempt of the senate's investigation of the Teapot Dome scandal.
- The comedy duo of Laurel and Hardy made the jump to talking films with the release of Unaccustomed As We Are. Stan Laurel's famous whimper of panic was heard for the first time, as was Oliver Hardy's catchphrase, "Why don't you do something to help me!"
- Wigan beat Dewsbury 13–2 in the 1928–29 Northern Rugby Football League Challenge Cup Final. It was the first time the Final was held at Wembley Stadium.
- Born:
  - Audrey Hepburn, Belgian-born British stage and film star, winner of the Academy, Emmy, Grammy and Tony Award; in Ixelles, Brussels (d. 1993)
  - Ronald Golias, Brazilian comedian and actor, in São Carlos (d. 2005)

== Sunday, May 5, 1929 ==
- Fifty policemen in Berlin were arrested for mutiny, as fighting with communists finally ended after four days.
- Born: Ilene Woods, voice actress and singer, in Portsmouth, New Hampshire (d. 2010)

== Monday, May 6, 1929 ==
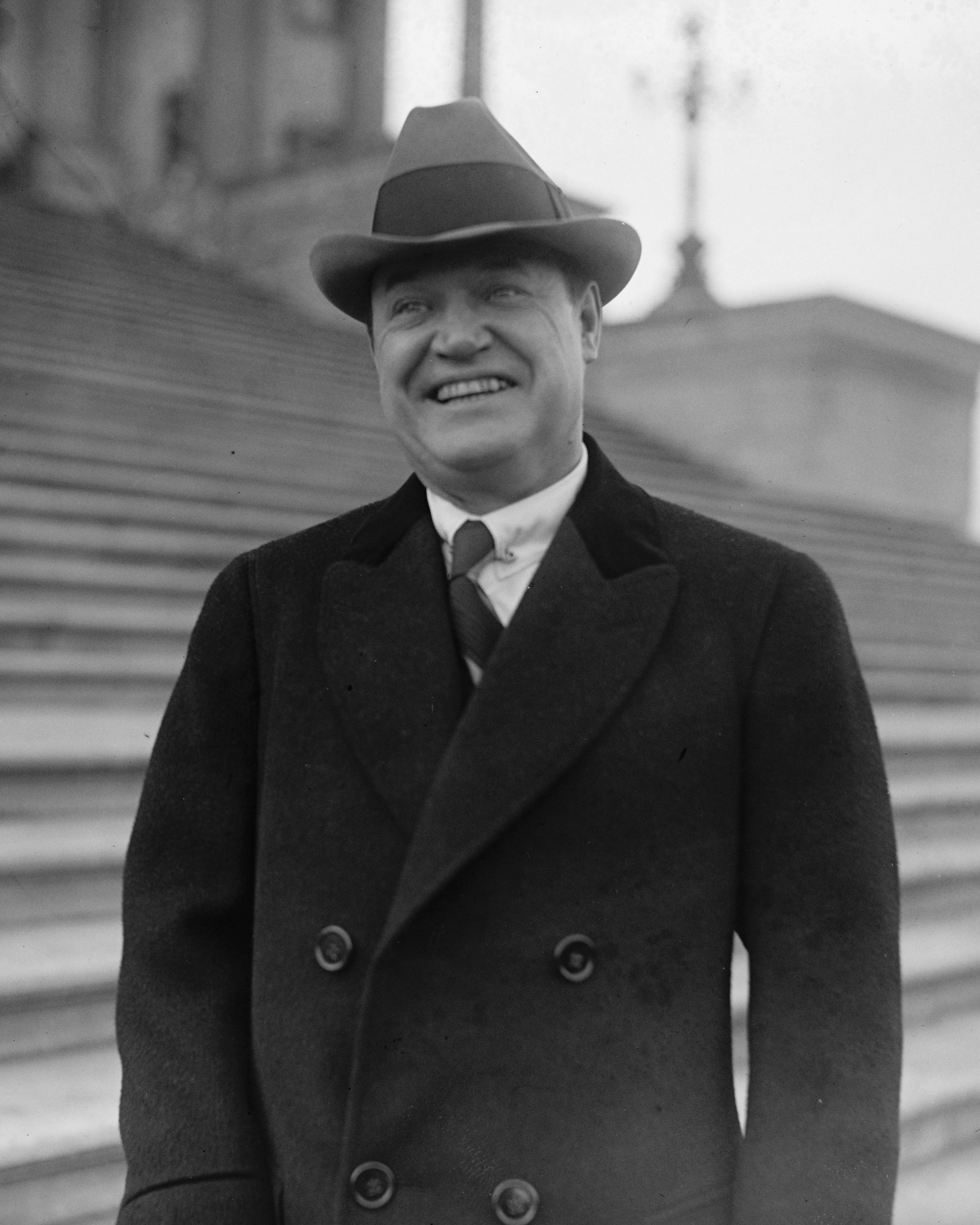
Sinclair

- Harry F. Sinclair turned himself in to authorities to begin his 90-day prison term for the Teapot Dome Scandal.
- Born: Paul Lauterbur, American chemist and Nobel laureate in 2003 in Medicine for his co-development of magnetic resonance imaging; in Sidney, Ohio (d. 2007)

== Tuesday, May 7, 1929 ==
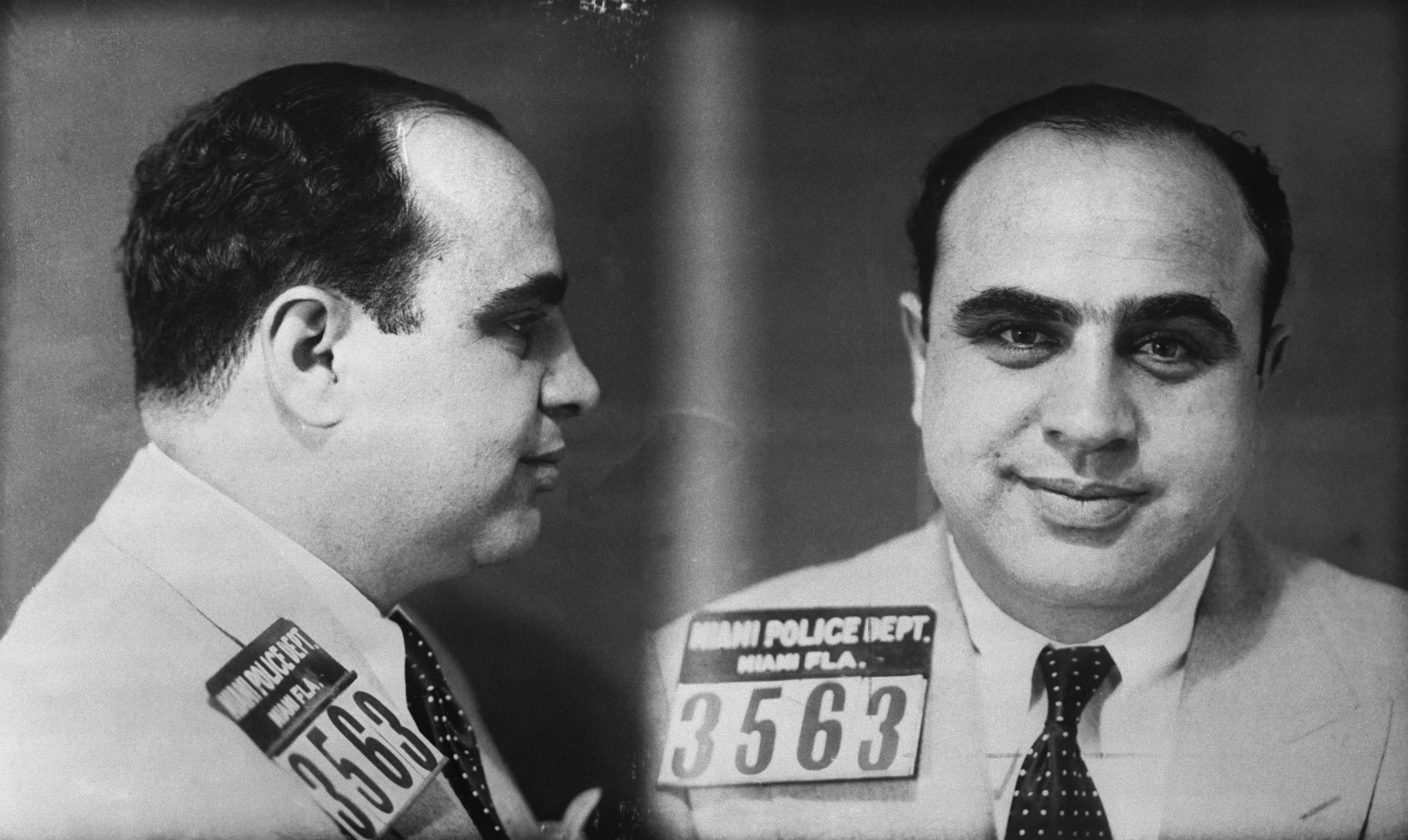
Al Capone

- Al Capone hosted a party to ostensibly honor gang members John Scalise, Albert Anselmi and Joseph Giunta. In February, Scalise and Anselmi had been arrested on suspicion of having carried out the Saint Valentine's Day Massacre, but released for lack of evidence. During the festivities Capone accused them of being traitors, then personally beat them with a club and shot them dead. Their bodies were dumped on a roadside near Hammond, Indiana, where they were found the next day.
- Born: Dick Williams, baseball player, manager and coach, in St. Louis, Missouri (d. 2011)

== Wednesday, May 8, 1929 ==
- Carl Hubbell of the New York Giants pitched an 11-0 no-hitter against the Pittsburgh Pirates at the Polo Grounds.
- Born:
  - Jane Roberts, U.S. author, in Saratoga Springs, New York (d. 1984)
  - Miyoshi Umeki, Japanese actress and singer, in Otaru, Hokkaido (d. 2007)

== Thursday, May 9, 1929 ==
- The Ibero-American Exposition of 1929 opened in Seville, Spain.
- A total eclipse of the Sun took place with visibility in Southeast Asia and the South Pacific.

== Friday, May 10, 1929 ==
- Dr. Freeland won the Preakness Stakes horse race.
- American golfer Walter Hagen won the 64th Open Championship, successfully defending his 1928 title.
- Born: Betty Foss, American professional baseball player for the AAGPBL, 1950 Rookie of the Year and 1952 Player of the Year in the league while at first base for the Fort Wayne Daisies; in Metropolis, Illinois (d. 1998)

== Saturday, May 11, 1929 ==
- Students rioted at Des Moines University when the Baptist institution fired its president and most of the faculty over accusations of modernism with regard to the question of evolution.
- The silent romantic drama film Eternal Love, starring John Barrymore and Camilla Horn, was released.
- Born: Margaret Kerry, actress, dancer, and motivational speaker; in Los Angeles, CA
- Died: Jozef Murgaš, 65, Slovak priest and inventor of numerous advances in wireless telegraphy

== Sunday, May 12, 1929 ==
- In a referendum in Switzerland, nearly two-thirds of voters rejected prohibition by voting against a proposal to institute local option with regard to the sale of alcoholic beverages.
- Born:
  - Sam Nujoma, the first President of Namibia (from 1990 to 2005), founder of the South West Africa People's Organization (SWAPO) and the People's Liberation Army of Namibia (PLAN); in Etunda Village, Ongandjera (d. 2025)
  - Dollard St. Laurent, Canadian ice hockey player, in Verdun, Quebec (d. 2015)

== Monday, May 13, 1929 ==
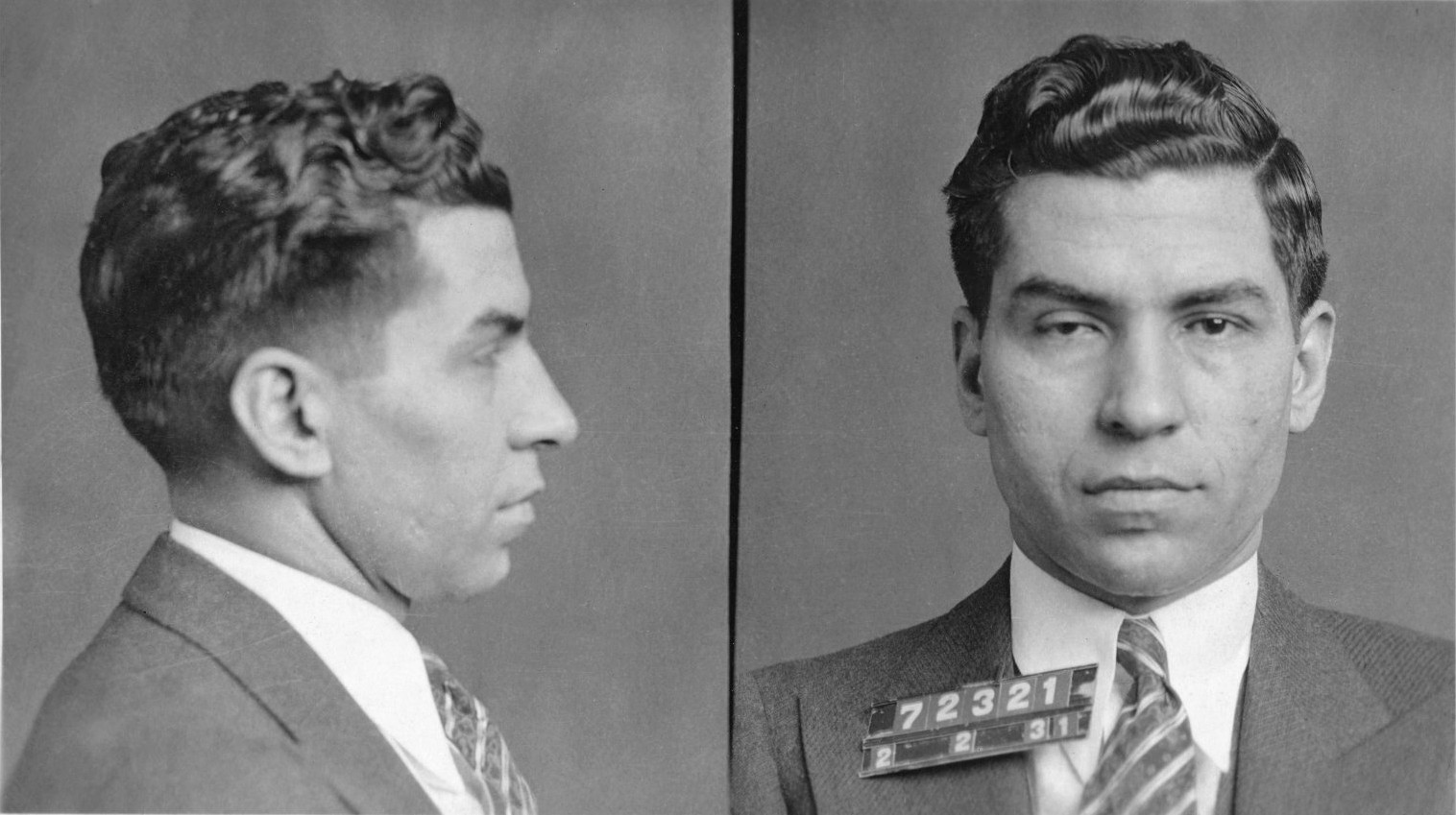
Lucky Luciano

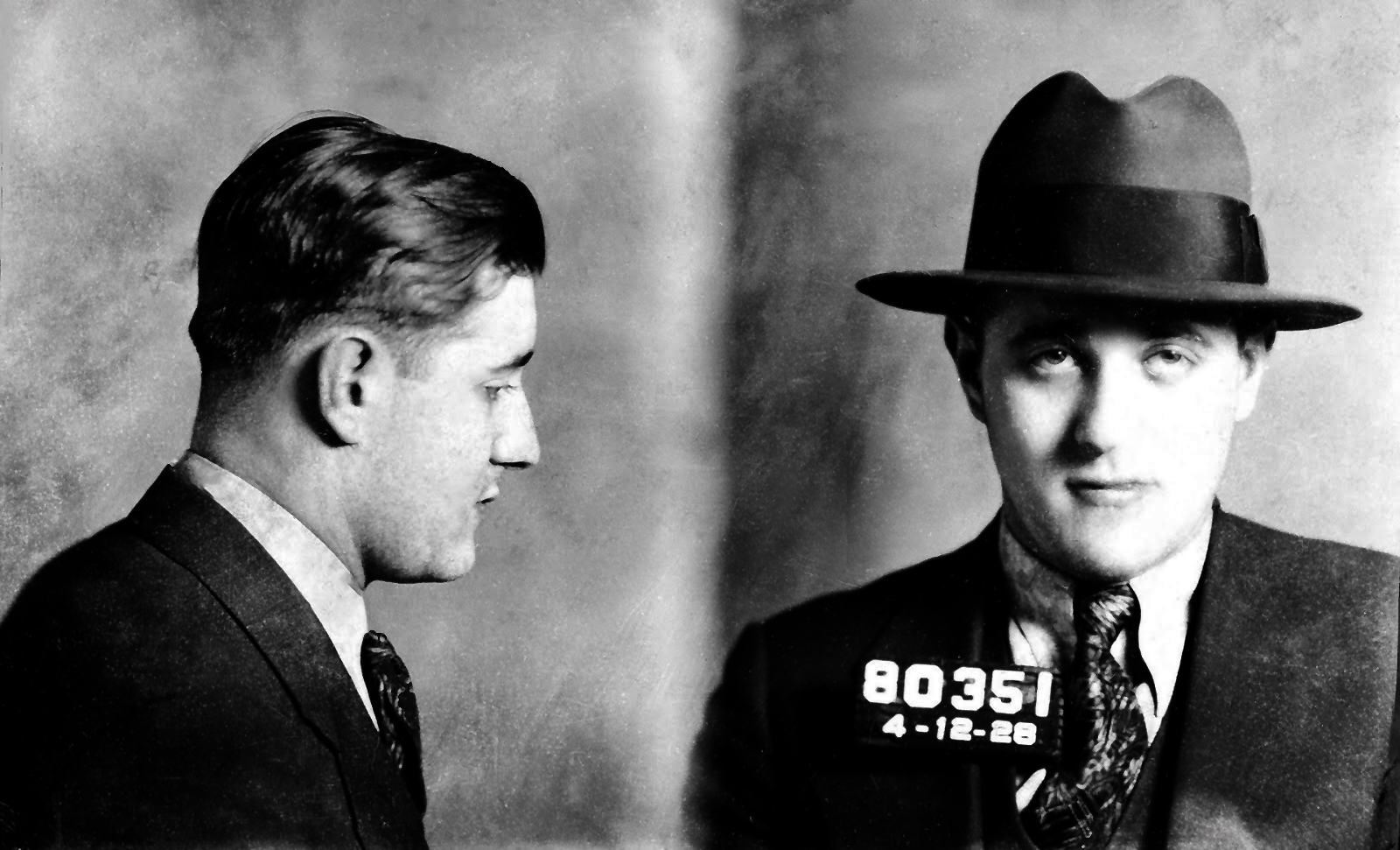
Bugsy Siegel

- Gangsters from eight U.S. states, including Lucky Luciano, Al Capone, Johnny Torrio and Bugsy Siegel, met in Atlantic City, New Jersey, to form a national crime syndicate. Over the next three days they settled disputes, agreed upon territorial boundaries and strolled along the boardwalk in full view of the media.
- Parliamentary elections were held in Estonia. The Socialist Workers' Party remained the largest party in parliament.
- Died: George Stallings, 61, American baseball player and manager; Arthur Scherbius, 50, inventor of the Enigma machine.

== Tuesday, May 14, 1929 ==
- The U.S. Senate passed President Hoover's farm relief bill, 54 to 33.
- Born: Gump Worsley, Canadian ice hockey player, in Montreal (d. 2007)

== Wednesday, May 15, 1929 ==
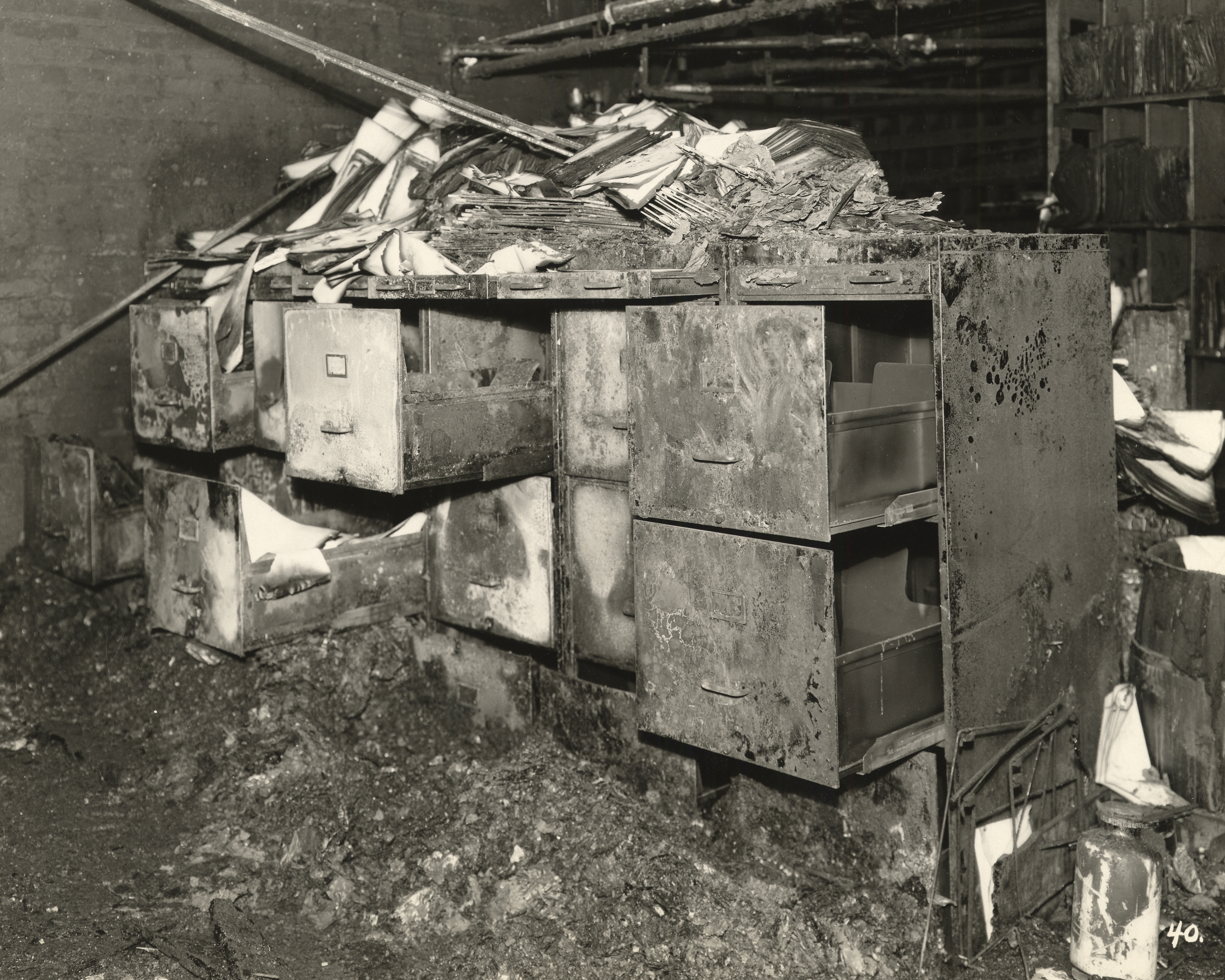
The file room after the fire

- A fire at the Cleveland Clinic killed 123 people, after nitrocellulose x-ray film ignited in the basement of the hospital. Most of the victims died from the inhalation of nitric acid fumes generated by the burning of the film stock.
- Germany submitted its reparations counterproposal to the Young Commission.

== Thursday, May 16, 1929 ==
- The first Academy Awards ceremony was held in the ballroom of the Hollywood Roosevelt Hotel in Los Angeles, with a private dinner for 270 guests, followed by the distribution of the 12 awards, whose recipients had been announced in advance in the Academy newsletter. German film star Emil Jannings was given the very first award, as Academy director Douglas Fairbanks handed him the statuette for Best Actor. Wings won the first-ever Award for Outstanding Picture.
- Near Cartagena, Spain, the Graf Zeppelin airship abandoned its second attempt to fly from Germany to the United States and turned back after losing power in two of its engines.
- Born:
  - Natwar Singh, Indian politician, in Jaghina, Bharatpur, British India (d. 2024)
  - Adrienne Rich, poet, essayist and feminist, in Baltimore (d. 2012)
- Died: Mary Boyce Temple, 72, American philanthropist and socialite

== Friday, May 17, 1929 ==
- Al Capone and a bodyguard were arrested in Philadelphia for carrying concealed weapons. They both pleaded guilty and each were sentenced to a year in prison.
- Died: Lilli Lehmann, 80, German operatic soprano

== Saturday, May 18, 1929 ==
- Clyde Van Dusen, a thoroughbred horse ridden by Linus McAtee, won the Kentucky Derby.
- Al Capone was incarcerated in Holmesburg Prison.
- Small Talk, the first Our Gang short comedy film to be made with sound, was released.
- Born: Jack Sanford, American baseball pitcher, 1957 National League Rookie of the Year and strikeout leader; in Wellesley Hills, Massachusetts (d. 2000)

== Sunday, May 19, 1929 ==
- Two people were killed in a stampede at Yankee Stadium, when a sudden rainstorm caused people in the right field bleachers to run for the exits. The disaster happened during the game between the Yankees and the visiting Boston Red Sox.
- Born: Curt Simmons, American baseball pitcher, in Whitehall Township, Pennsylvania (d. 2022)

== Monday, May 20, 1929 ==
- The 1929 Barcelona International Exposition opened in Spain.
- U.S. President Herbert Hoover appointed the Wickersham Commission to study crime and policing.
- Born: Ahmed Hamdi, Egyptian engineer (d. 1973)

== Tuesday, May 21, 1929 ==
- The ballet The Prodigal Son, choreographed by George Balanchine with music by Sergei Prokofiev, premiered at the Théâtre de la Ville in Paris.
- Fascist Italy banned beauty pageants as "grave inconveniences to the moral order".
- Died:
  - Archibald Primrose, Earl of Rosebaery, 82, Prime Minister of the United Kingdom from 1894 to 1895
  - Elise, Countess of Edla (Elise Hensler), 92, German-born American actress and singer and the second wife of the former King Ferdinand II of Portugal, whom she married in 1869 after his 1853 abdication.

== Wednesday, May 22, 1929 ==
- Croatian politician Vladko Maček was arrested by Yugoslavian authorities.

== Thursday, May 23, 1929 ==
- Feng Yuxiang, who had been War Minister of China until attempting a revolt against President Chiang Kai-shek, was expelled permanently from the Kuomintang.
- Mickey Mouse was heard speaking on screen for the first time with the release of the cartoon short The Karnival Kid.
- Born: Vic Stasiuk, Canadian ice hockey player who was part of the trio of Ukrainian-Canadians to make up "The Uke Line" for the Boston Bruins in the National Hockey League; in Lethbridge, Alberta (d. 2023)

== Friday, May 24, 1929 ==
- The United Free Church of Scotland agreed to be merged into the larger Church of Scotland.

== Saturday, May 25, 1929 ==
- The Italian Senate approved the Lateran Accords by a vote of 315 to 6.
- Born: Beverly Sills (stage name for Belle Miriam Silverman), American operatic soprano, in Brooklyn (d. 2007)

== Sunday, May 26, 1929 ==
- The monoplane Fort Worth set a new flight endurance record, completing 172 hours, 31 minutes and 1 second in the air over Fort Worth, Texas. The new record was almost a full day longer than the old mark set by Question Mark ("?") in January.
- The Catholic Party won the Belgian general election.

== Monday, May 27, 1929 ==
- The U.S. Supreme Court decided the "Pocket Veto Case" (Bands of the State of Washington v. United States and Okanogan, Methow, San Poelis, Nespelem, Colville, and Lake Indian Tribes v. United States), interpreting Article I of the U.S. Constitution and the provision that a bill that has not been signed or returned to Congress within 10 days becomes law unless Congress has adjourned. Specifically, the Court determined that adjourning for the summer would not have prevented Congress from reconsidering a bill, as opposed to adjourning without consideration of further legislation.
- The Court decided United States v. Schwimmer, upholding the denial of U.S. citizenship to Hungarian pacifist Rosika Schwimmer, who had refused to agree that she was "willing to "take up arms in defense of her country".
- Charles Lindbergh and Anne Morrow were married in a surprise ceremony outside Englewood, New Jersey.

== Tuesday, May 28, 1929 ==
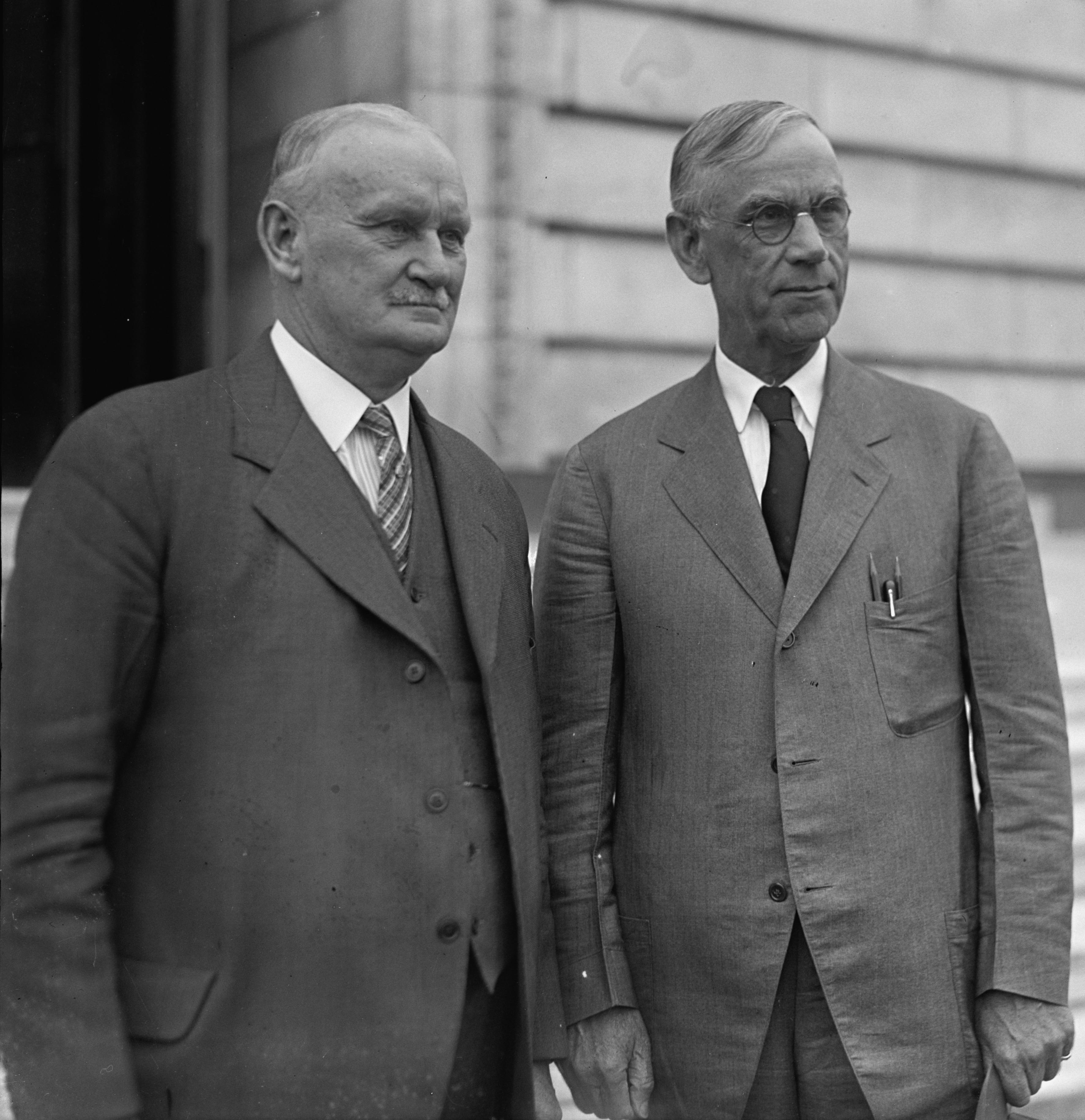
Mr. Smoot and Mr. Hawley

- The U.S. House of Representatives passed the Smoot-Hawley Tariff Bill by a vote of 264–147.
- The all-color musical film On with the Show premiered at the Winter Garden Theatre in New York City.

== Wednesday, May 29, 1929 ==
- A series of explosions in the sewer system of Ottawa, the capital of Canada, killed one person. Mrs. Anna Hayden, a 73-year-old widow, died when the blast had set fire to curtains in her home on Templeton Street.

== Thursday, May 30, 1929 ==
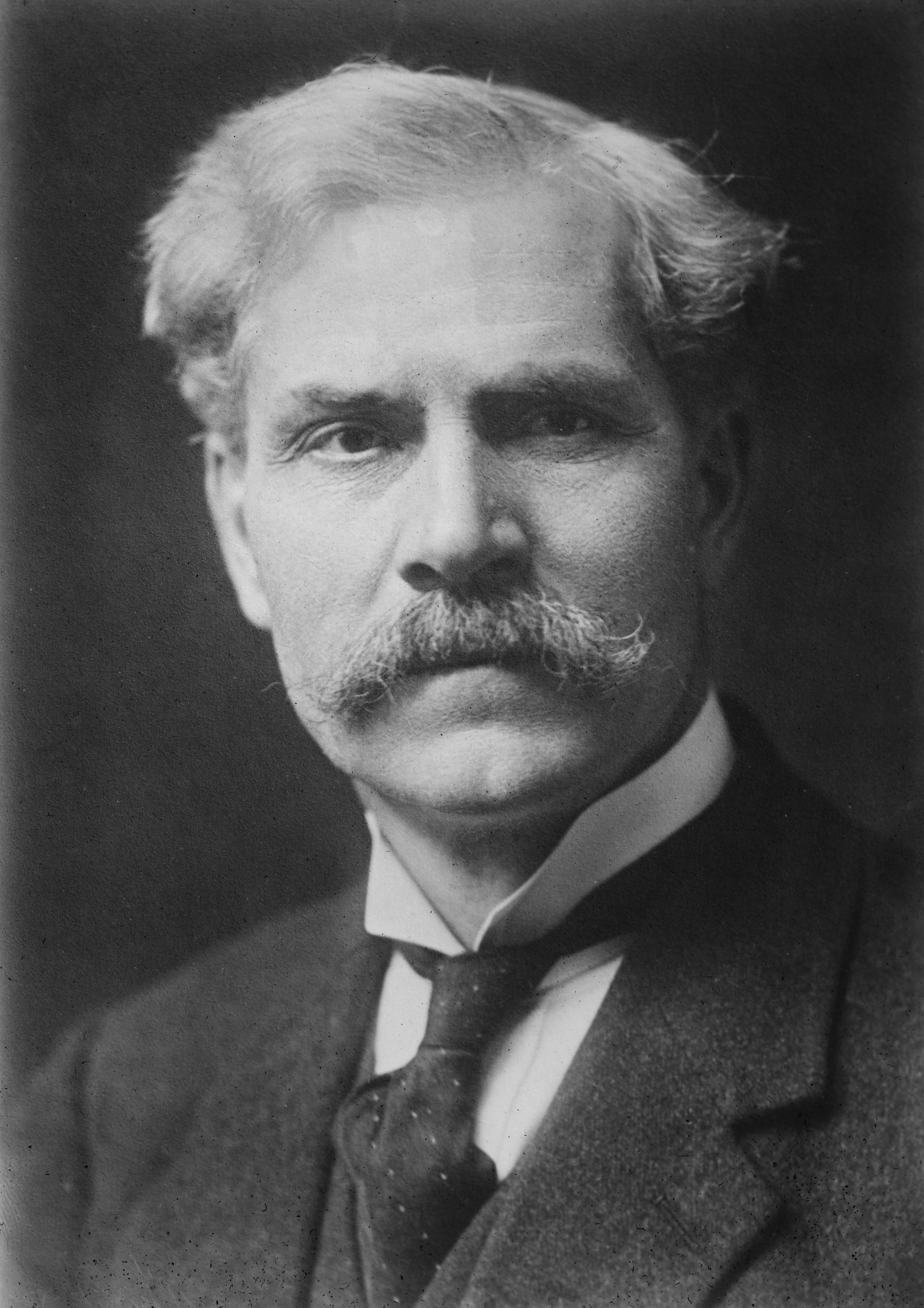
MacDonald

- The Elections were held in the United Kingdom for the 612-seat House of Commons, with no party or coalition of candidates winning a majority, resulting in a hung parliament. The Conservative Party of Prime Minister Stanley Baldwin lost 152 of its 412 seats in Commons, while the Labour Party of Ramsay MacDonald gained 136 seats for a plurality of 287. Baldwin resigned and MacDonald formed a government on June 5.
- Ray Keech won the Indianapolis 500.

== Friday, May 31, 1929 ==
- The Ford Motor Company signed a nine-year contract with the Soviet Union. The Soviets agreed to purchase $30 million worth of Ford products within four years while Ford agreed to provide technical advice and help build an automobile factory in Nizhny Novgorod. The Nizhegorodsky Avtomobilny Zavod factory would open at the end of 1931 and produce its first vehicle, based on the Ford Model A, and marketed in the USSR as the NAZ-A starting on January 1, 1932.
