= August 1929 =

Month of 1929

<<	August 1929					>>
Su	Mo	Tu	We	Th	Fr	Sa
				1	2	3
4	5	6	7	8	9	10
11	12	13	14	15	16	17
18	19	20	21	22	23	24
25	26	27	28	29	30	31

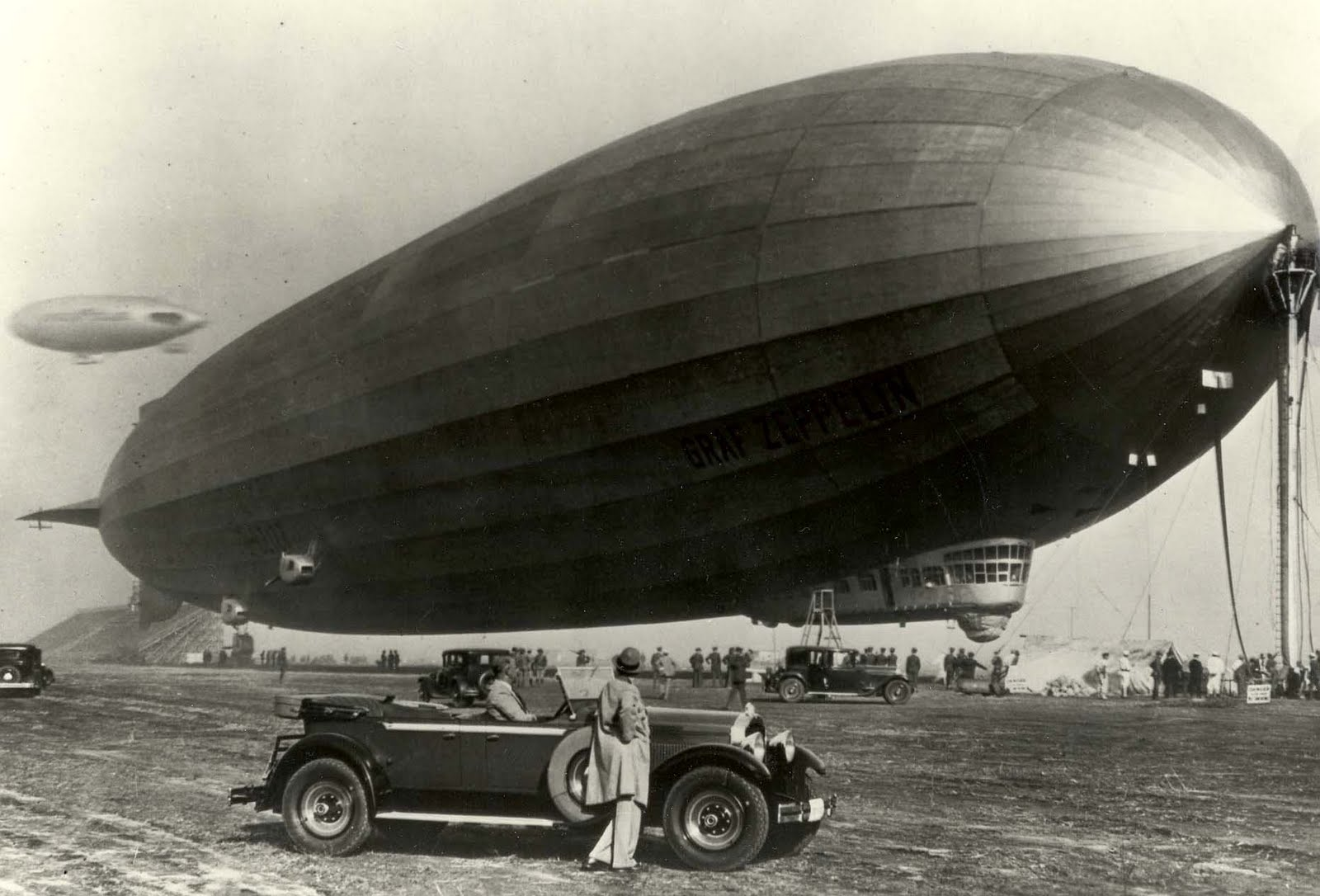
August 8 to 29, 1929: German airship Graf Zeppelin makes the first aerial flight around the world

The following events occurred in August 1929:

== Thursday, August 1, 1929 ==
- International Red Day passed with only isolated reports of violence. Riots were limited to Chișinău, Romania, and Helsinki, Finland. 300,000 participated in an anti-war demonstration on Berlin marking the fifteenth anniversary of the outbreak of the World War.
- The first-ever congress on radiation therapy opened in Paris.
- The Nazi Party opened its 4th Party Congress in Nuremberg. 60,000 paraded during the four-day event.

== Friday, August 2, 1929 ==
- Boxing's world lightweight champion Sammy Mandell retained the title with a 10-round split decision over Tony Canzoneri in Chicago Stadium.

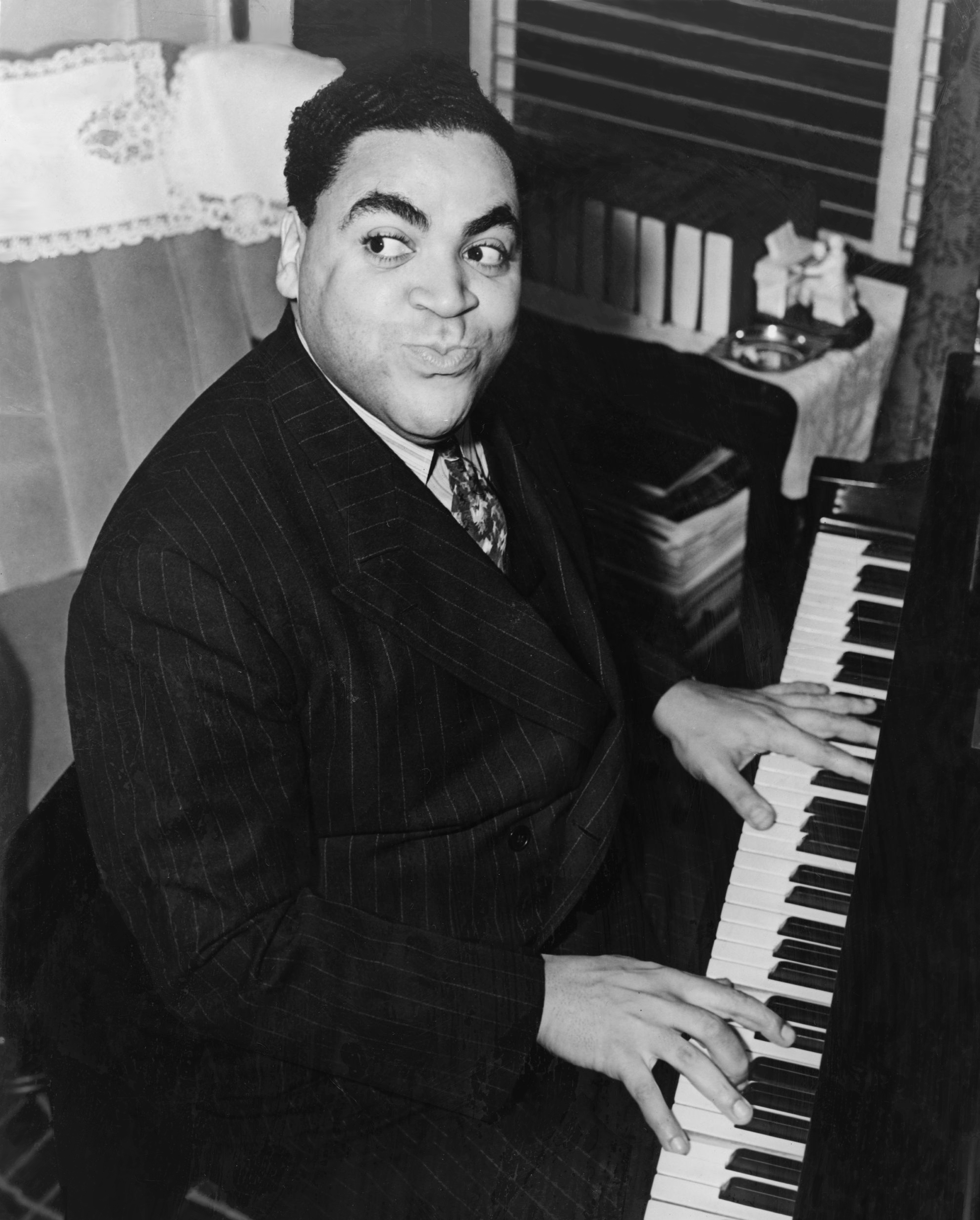
Waller

- Fats Waller recorded his classic song "Ain't Misbehavin'".

== Saturday, August 3, 1929 ==
- The 16th World Zionist Congress passed a resolution authorizing a delegation to approach the British government on the matter of Jewish rights at the Wailing Wall in Jerusalem. Muslims had been erecting buildings near the sacred site, which Jewish organizations in the region held to be in disregard of guarantees made to the Jewish people by the British government.
- The Kingdom of Hejaz and Nejd signed a treaty of friendship with Turkey.
- Jiddu Krishnamurti, believed likely to be the messianic Maitreya (by Charles Webster Leadbeater), shocked the Theosophy movement by dissolving the Order of the Star in the East, the organisation established to support him.
- Died: Emile Berliner, 78, German-born American inventor; Thorstein Veblen, 72, Norwegian-American economist

== Sunday, August 4, 1929 ==
- The Graf Zeppelin airship arrived in Lakehurst, New Jersey, three days after it left its hangar at Friedrichshafen in Germany, completing its third transatlantic flight. It departed from Lakehurst on August 8 to begin an attempt to fly around the world and arrived back at Friedrichshafen on August 10.
- Jones Beach State Park opened on Jones Beach Island in New York.
- The first Challenge International de Tourisme, a competition between makers of 55 different models of light aircraft ("tourist airplanes") began in Paris. German pilot Fritz Morzik was the overall winner, flying his BFW M.23.
- Died: Franz Matt, 68, German politician

== Monday, August 5, 1929 ==
- King Albert of Belgium decreed that Albert National Park in the Belgian Congo would be expanded and the land set aside for preservation and scientific study. Severe penalties were imposed on anyone harming or otherwise interfering with the flora or fauna of the region.
- The Lupeni Strike began in Lupeni, Romania.
- Died: Dame Millicent Fawcett, 82, English suffragist

== Tuesday, August 6, 1929 ==
- An international conference opened in The Hague to finalize the Young Plan.
- Great Britain signed a treaty with Egypt ending British occupation and replacing it with a military alliance allowing Britain to station troops along the Suez Canal.
- In the Lupeni Strike, troops were called in after the miners seized a local power plant and fighting broke out. The number of miners reported killed ranged from 15 to 58.
- The musical drama film Say It with Songs, starring Al Jolson, was released.

== Wednesday, August 7, 1929 ==
- The Antioquia Railway in Colombia was finally finished after 55 years of construction in difficult terrain when the first train passed through the 3,742-meter tunnel from El Limón to Santiago.
- Born: Don Larsen, American baseball player known for having pitched a perfect game during the 1956 World Series; in Michigan City, Indiana (d. 2020)
- Died: Victor L. Berger, 69, Austro-Hungarian-born American socialist journalist and politician

== Thursday, August 8, 1929 ==
- Arabs in Palestine conducted widespread attacks against Jews for the first time due to the Wailing Wall dispute.
- Born: Ronnie Biggs, English master thief known for his role in the 1963 "Great Train Robbery" that netted over £2.6 million; in Stockwell, London (d. 2013)

== Friday, August 9, 1929 ==
- Two people were killed in fighting between German Communists and Berlin police in eastern Berlin after more than 1,000 communists, waving red flags and singing "The Internationale", refused a police order to disperse.

== Saturday, August 10, 1929 ==
- U.S. President Herbert Hoover celebrated his 55th birthday at the presidential camp in Madison County, Virginia; Charles and Anne Lindbergh were among the guests.

== Sunday, August 11, 1929 ==
- Persia formally recognized Iraq and signed a treaty of friendship.
- On the tenth anniversary of the Weimar Republic, new three- and five-mark silver coins were issued bearing the profile of President Paul von Hindenburg.

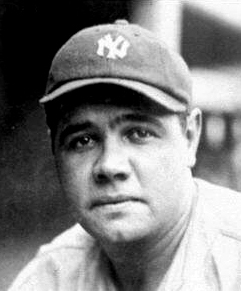
Babe Ruth

- In Cleveland, Babe Ruth hit the 500th major league home run of his career and became the first member of the 500 home run club.
- Born: Earl Brooks, American race car driver; in Lynchburg, Virginia (d. 2010)

== Monday, August 12, 1929 ==
- Hungarian police made 13 more arrests in the Angel Makers of Nagyrév case as sensational reports of widespread husband poisoning centered around the village of Nagyrév, Hungary drew worldwide attention.
- The Italian government began to redistribute 3,500 acres of unused land belonging to the Doria family that had been seized by the state as part of national policy that land must be cultivated in order to increase the country's agricultural output. Over the next two days, a lottery system was used to grant 230 parcels of land to peasant farmers.
- Britain refused a Chinese demand to give up its extraterritoriality rights to China.
- RCA, the Radio Corporation of America, lost a lawsuit charging the company with patent infringement and was ordered to pay over $20 million in back royalties to three plaintiffs.

== Tuesday, August 13, 1929 ==
- At the Hague conference, the Allies agreed to reduce their troop presence in the Rhineland by September 1.
- The Pedestrians Association, advocating for road safety and the rights of pedestrians, was formed in London.

== Wednesday, August 14, 1929 ==
- After four days of maintenance and refitting, the Graf Zeppelin left its hangar at Friedrichshafen and flew eastward for Tokyo to begin its round-the-world tour. It would arrive on August 19 after a five-day flight, circling over the city before landing at the airport in Kasumigaura.
- Ohio State University professor of veterinary medicine James H. Snook was convicted of murdering his mistress and sentenced to death in the electric chair. The jury returned its verdict in just 28 minutes.
- Border clashes between Chinese and Soviet troops were reported from the border city of Manzhouli as peace talks faltered.
- Born: U.S. Navy Admiral Kinnaird R. McKee; in Louisville, Kentucky (d. 2013)
- Died: British Army General Henry Horne, 1st Baron Horne, 68

== Thursday, August 15, 1929 ==
- The British cotton workers' strike ended when both sides agreed to resume work on Monday at pre-strike wages until a court of arbitration could deliver a judgement on the application of the employers to reduce wages.
- During a speech in Ottawa, Ontario, Canada, Winston Churchill said that no worthwhile naval agreement could be reached between Britain and the United States until the Americans recognized certain fundamental differences in the circumstances of the two nations. "To apply a rigid plan of numerical equality to conditions that are markedly unequal will be extremely difficult in reaching the true goal that Britain and the United States shall be equal powers on the sea", Churchill stated.
- The first commercial airport to service Philadelphia PA opened in Pennsauken NJ. Central Airport was officially dedicated on September 2, 1929 and served Philadelphia until the early 1940's

== Friday, August 16, 1929 ==
- Muslims looted and vandalized a Jewish temple near the Wailing Wall as violence in Jerusalem continued.
- The General Act for the Pacific Settlement of International Disputes went into effect.
- Born: Fritz Von Erich, professional wrestler, in Jewett, Texas (d. 1997)

== Saturday, August 17, 1929 ==
- Sixteen coal miners in Poland were killed in an underground explosion near Katowice.

== Sunday, August 18, 1929 ==
- The Women's Air Derby, the first all-women's race in aviation history, began in Santa Monica, California with 20 pilots competing to be the first to reach Cleveland, Ohio, for $24,000 in prize money.
- Born: Joan Taylor, actress, in Geneva, Illinois (d. 2012)

== Monday, August 19, 1929 ==
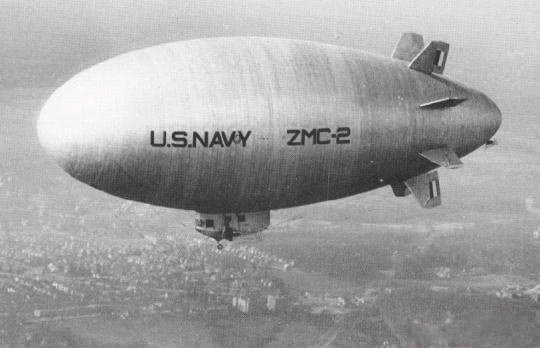
The ZMC-2 over Washington

- The U.S. airship ZMC-2, the only dirigible with a skin of metal, was first flown.
- At least 18 Romanian soldiers were killed in an ammunition explosion at a fort in Bucharest.
- The central portion of the French ocean liner SS Paris was heavily damaged by a mysterious fire while docked at Le Havre.
- Died:
  - Marvel Crosson, 29, American aviator, was killed when her airplane crashed in Arizona on the second day of the Women's Air Derby
  - Sergei Diaghilev, 57, Russian ballet impresario

== Tuesday, August 20, 1929 ==
- The King Vidor-directed musical film Hallelujah!, with music by Irving Berlin and starring Daniel L. Haynes and Nina Mae McKinney, was released in the United States.
- First transmissions of John Logie Baird's experimental 30-line television system by the BBC in London.
- Died: Albert Parker Niblack, 70, U.S. admiral

== Wednesday, August 21, 1929 ==
- The Mahatma Gandhi was elected president of the Indian National Congress, but he refused to accept the post.
- Mexican artists Frida Kahlo and Diego Rivera were married in Kahlo's hometown of Coyoacán.
- Born: Marie Severin, comic book artist known for her work for Marvel Comics, in East Rockaway, New York (d. 2018)
- Died: James Parks, 86, freed American slave and the only known person to have been born on, and buried in, the grounds of what would become the Arlington National Cemetery. The cemetery was established in 1864, when Parks was 21 years old.

== Thursday, August 22, 1929 ==
- The Graf Zeppelin had to delay the next leg of its round-the-world journey to Los Angeles when two struts broke on the rear gondola as it was leaving the hangar at Kasumigaura airport in Japan. It was repaired the next day.
- The Music Box Theatre opened in Chicago.
- Died: Otto Liman von Sanders, 74, German general

== Friday, August 23, 1929 ==
- The U.S. Department of War made an exception to its rule against civilian burials in Arlington National Cemetery so that freed slave James Parks could be interred on the grounds where he was born and worked.
- The Palestine riots began.

== Saturday, August 24, 1929 ==
- Martial law was declared in Jerusalem due to rioting as Arabs killed 67 Jews in the Hebron massacre.
- Born: Yasser Arafat, Egyptian-born founder of the Palestinian Liberation Organization (PLO); in Cairo (d. 2004)

== Sunday, August 25, 1929 ==
- The New York Giants used the first public address system in baseball history during a game against the Pittsburgh Pirates. In addition to player at-bats and substitutions being announced to the crowd without the use of a megaphone, umpire Cy Rigler had a microphone inside his mask to amplify his calls at the plate. Though the experiment was a success, the use of electronic public address systems at games did not become widespread until the 1940s.

== Monday, August 26, 1929 ==
- The Graf Zeppelin sailed over Los Angeles at 1:16 a.m. as it completed the first non-stop flight ever made across the Pacific Ocean. It took off from Mines Field at LA 23 hours later, at 12:14 a.m. on the final leg of its round-the-world journey.
- Louise Thaden won the Women's Air Derby.
- Died: Sir Ernest Satow, 86, British diplomat and scholar

== Tuesday, August 27, 1929 ==
- The trial of 250 members of the Sicilian Mafia for minor offenses ended in Italy. 43 were given prison terms of up to three years, 168 were acquitted and a new trial was ordered for the remaining 39.
- Born: Ralph T. Coe, American art collector and scholar (d. 2010)
- Died:
  - Herman Potočnik Noordung, 36, Slovenian rocket engineer, from pneumonia
  - James Knox Taylor, 71, American architect

== Wednesday, August 28, 1929 ==
- In Charlotte, North Carolina, jury selection began in the trial of 16 members of the National Textile Workers Union who were accused of murdering a police chief during June 7 rioting related to the Loray Mill Strike.

== Thursday, August 29, 1929 ==
- Sixty-nine people on the passenger steamship SS San Juan drowned when the vessel sank off the coast of San Francisco after a collision with an oil tanker. The ship went beneath the waves in only five minutes.
- The Safed riots killed 18 Jewish residents of Safed and wounded about 40 as 200 houses were burned and looted.
- At 8:13 a.m. the Graf Zeppelin completed its round-the-world trip back where it started in Lakehurst, New Jersey, a little over 21 days since it began. The airship only made three stops the entire journey and was in the air for less than 12 days.

== Friday, August 30, 1929 ==
- The Young Plan conference at The Hague formally ended with an exchange of signed conventions agreeing to end the occupation of the Rhineland.
- The Technicolor musical comedy film Gold Diggers of Broadway premiered.
- Died:
  - William Menzies Alexander, 71, Scottish medical and theological writer
  - Peng Pai, 32, Chinese Communist Party revolutionary, was executed six days after being arrested by the Kuomintang police in Shanghai.

== Saturday, August 31, 1929 ==
- The Soviet Union accepted Chinese proposals for settlement of the Sino-Soviet conflict.
- Northern Rhodesia held general elections for seven seats on the Legislative Council. Voters essentially rejected a proposed amalgamation with Southern Rhodesia as pro-merger candidates only won a single seat while anti-merger candidates won three.
- The 32-floor Foshay Tower, at 447 feet (136 m) the tallest building in the state of Minnesota, opened. With each story smaller than the one below, the Foshay was designed in the style of the Washington Monument.
- Born: Ken MacAfee, American football player, in North Easton, Massachusetts (d. 2007)
- Died: Morton Prince, 74, American physician
