= July 1929 =

Month of 1929

<<	July 1929					>>
Su	Mo	Tu	We	Th	Fr	Sa
	1	2	3	4	5	6
7	8	9	10	11	12	13
14	15	16	17	18	19	20
21	22	23	24	25	26	27
28	29	30	31

The following events occurred in July 1929:

== Monday, July 1, 1929 ==
- Britain and China signed a pact in which Britain agreed to help build up the Chinese navy.
- The Chilean senate approved the Treaty of Lima.
- Born: Gerald Edelman, biologist, in Ozone Park, Queens, New York (d. 2014)

== Tuesday, July 2, 1929 ==
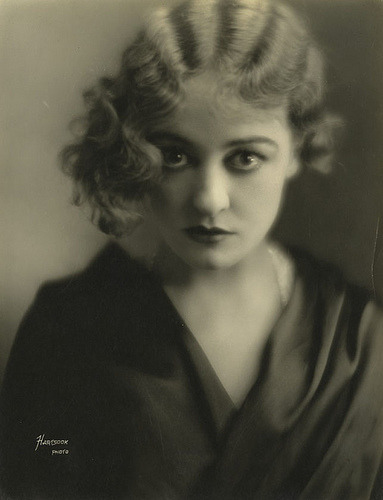
July 2, 1929: Warner Bros. film star Gladys Brockwell dies of auto accident injuries

- A new session of British parliament opened with the first King's Speech ever made under a Labour government. The speech was read by Lord Sankey as George V, still recovering from a long illness, was advised by doctors not to attend in person.
- Mill Valley, California, was devastated by fire.
- Born:
  - Imelda Marcos, First Lady of the Philippines, in Manila
  - Chuck Stobbs, baseball pitcher; in Wheeling, West Virginia (d. 2008)
- Died: Gladys Brockwell, 34, American actress and silent film star, died from injuries sustained after a June 27 car accident in which the automobile in which she was riding went off of a cliff on the Ventura Highway in Southern California. She had recently completed filming as the star of The Drake Case after having made the transition to sound film with the Warner Bros. studio film Lights of New York.

== Wednesday, July 3, 1929 ==
- The Ramsay MacDonald government announced they would cut imports and manufacture as much as possible domestically in order to fight unemployment.
- 42-year-old Georges Landoy, a newspaper editor from Antwerp, Belgium, fell into a hot spring in the Old Faithful area of Yellowstone National Park. He died of his burns two days later. The hot spring into which Landoy fell was subsequently named "Belgian Pool".
- Died: Dustin Farnum, 55, American actor

== Thursday, July 4, 1929 ==
- During a game at Wrigley Field between the Chicago Cubs and the Cincinnati Reds, Cubs outfielder Hack Wilson charged into the Reds dugout and attacked pitcher Ray Kolp, who had been heckling him. Wilson was ejected from the game. Later that night, as the two teams mingled at the train station, Wilson told several Reds players he was going into their car to make Kolp apologize. When Pete Donohue warned Wilson he would not leave alive, Wilson punched him in the face and knocked him to the floor. Railroad officials and other members of both teams intervened to avert any further fighting.
- Born: Al Davis, American football coach and Oakland Raiders owner, in Brockton, Massachusetts (d. 2011)

== Friday, July 5, 1929 ==
- British police seized twelve paintings of nudes by D H Lawrence from a gallery in Mayfair on grounds of indecency.
- Helen Wills won her third straight Wimbledon title, defeating Helen Jacobs in the Women's Singles Final.
- Born:
  - Katherine Helmond, Award-winning American TV actress known for Who's the Boss? and Everybody Loves Raymond; in Galveston, Texas (d. 2019)
  - Chikao Ōtsuka, Japanese actor, in Tokyo (d. 2015)

== Saturday, July 6, 1929 ==
- Henri Cochet of France defeated Jean Borotra in the Men's Singles Final at Wimbledon.
- Born: Ray Mendoza (ring name for José Díaz Velázquez), Mexican-born U.S. professional wrestler; in Mexico City (d. 2003)

== Sunday, July 7, 1929 ==
- A special day of thanksgiving was observed in churches across the British Empire to express gratitude for the recovery of King George V from his lengthy illness.

== Monday, July 8, 1929 ==
- Germany opened its first major aviation museum in a castle in Stuttgart on the 91st anniversary of the birthday of Count Ferdinand von Zeppelin.

== Tuesday, July 9, 1929 ==
- The British submarine HMS H47 sank in St George's Channel off the coast of Wales after a collision with another British submarine, HMS L12. Twenty-one of the 24 crew of H47 and three on L12 died.
- Born:
  - King Hassan II of Morocco, ruler of Morocco from 1961 until his death; in Rabat as the eldest son of Sultan Mohammed V (d. 1999)
  - Wally Post, American baseball player, in St. Wendelin, Ohio (d. 1982)

== Wednesday, July 10, 1929 ==
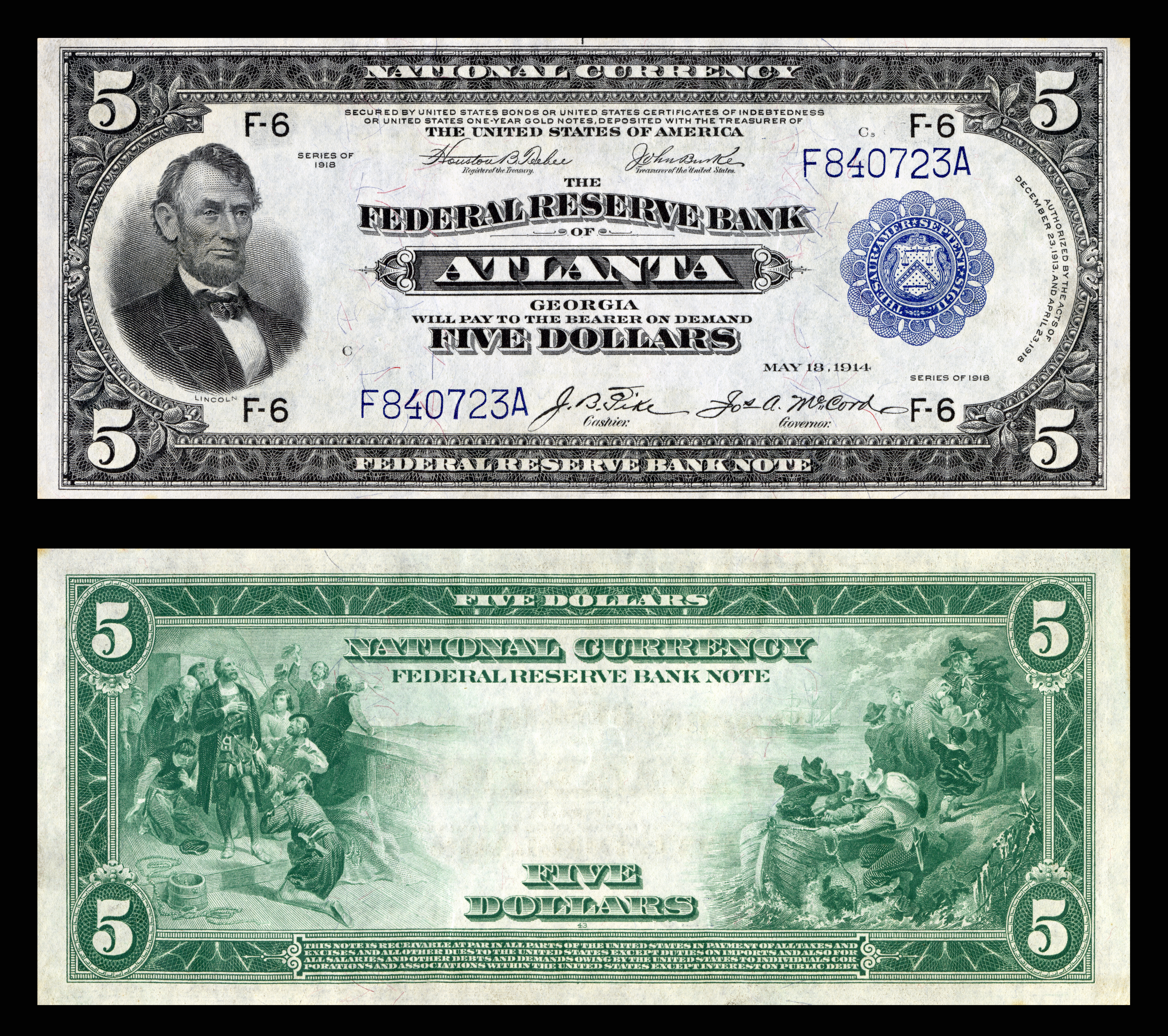
July 10, 1929: Large U.S. banknotes taken replaced...

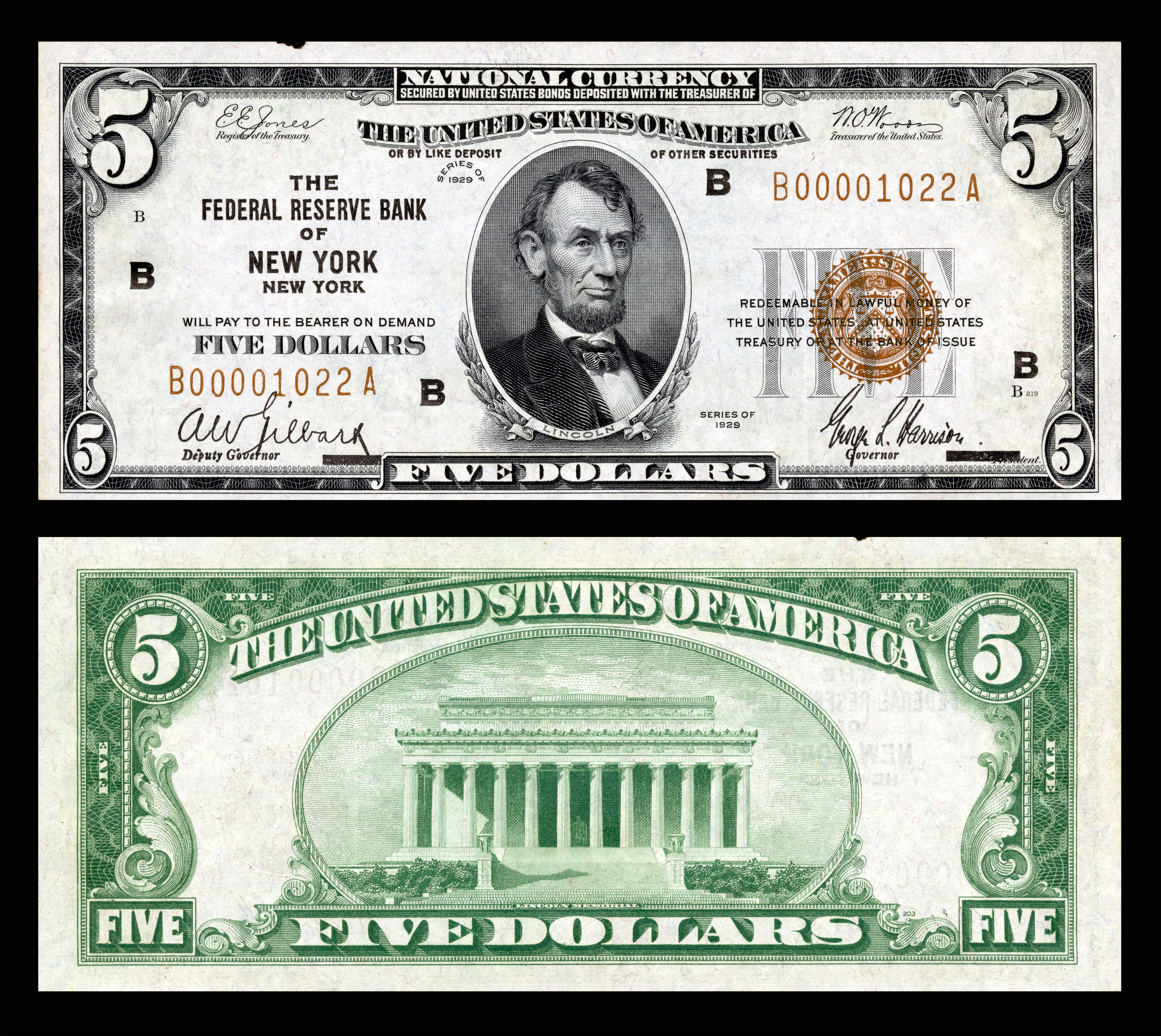
...by notes 17% percent narrower and shorter

- New, smaller paper currency was put into circulation in the United States in the size that would be the standard more than 90 years later. The new bills were about 69% the size of the previous bills, 6.14 inches vs. 7.42 inches long, and 2.61 inches vs. 3.125 inches wide.
- The Southern Cross set a new record by completing a flight from the Australian coast to the English coast in 12 days 21 hours and 13 minutes, more than 2 days faster than the old record set in February 1928.

== Thursday, July 11, 1929 ==
- China ordered 300 Russian officials and employees out of the country as Chinese authorities completely took over the Chinese Eastern Railway.
- The British government refused to grant Leon Trotsky political asylum.
- Born: David Kelly, Irish actor, in Dublin (d. 2012)

== Friday, July 12, 1929 ==
- A new flight endurance record was set when the Buhl Airsedan Angeleno landed after more than 10 days in the air over Culver City, California.
- Died: Robert Henri, 64, American painter

== Saturday, July 13, 1929 ==
- Belgium and Germany reached a settlement on the question of German money left in Belgium at the end of the war. Germany agreed to pay 500 million gold marks over a series of annuities to make good on the valueless currency. Belgium had insisted on settling the longstanding issue before endorsing the Young Plan.
- The drama film Dangerous Curves starring Clara Bow and Richard Arlen was released.

== Sunday, July 14, 1929 ==
- The Soviet Union gave China a three-day ultimatum in the Chinese Eastern Railway crisis. China was ordered to release all arrested Russian citizens and call a conference for dialogue.
- Born: Bob Purkey, U.S. baseball player, in Pittsburgh (d. 2008)
- Died: Hans Delbrück, 80, German military historian

== Monday, July 15, 1929 ==
- Another operation was performed on George V to remove portions of two of his ribs in order to drain a lung abscess.
- Britain invited the Soviet Union to discuss the resumption of diplomatic relations.
- The Federal Farm Board met for the first time. "In selecting this Board I have sought for suggestions from the many scores of farmers' cooperatives and other organizations and yours were the names most universally commended", President Hoover told the gathering. "... By your appointment I invest you with responsibility, authority and resources such as have never before been conferred by our Government in assistance to any industry."
- Died: Hugo von Hofmannsthal, 55, Austrian writer

== Tuesday, July 16, 1929 ==
- China made two demands of its own to the Soviet Union, calling for the release of 1,000 imprisoned Chinese nationals and adequate protection for Chinese in Russia from repression.
- The Chilean transport ship Abtao sank in a storm off the coast of San Antonio; only two of the crew of 43 survived.

== Wednesday, July 17, 1929 ==
- The Soviet Union broke off diplomatic relations with China and began to mobilize its army along the Chinese border.
- Born: Roy McMillan, U.S. baseball player and 3-time Gold Glove winner; in Bonham, Texas (d. 1997)

== Thursday, July 18, 1929 ==
- A train plunged into a creek near Stratton, Colorado, when a trestle bridge collapsed, killing 9.
- Born: Screamin' Jay Hawkins, American rhythm and blues musician, in Cleveland (d. 2000)

== Friday, July 19, 1929 ==
- The interior of the Royal Danish Theatre was partially destroyed by fire.
- Born: Alice Pollitt, American baseball player and the AAGPBL's home run leader in the 1951 season; in Lansing, Michigan (d. 2016)

== Saturday, July 20, 1929 ==
- 2,000 were left homeless in Ankara, Turkey by an early morning fire that razed the old quarter of the city.
- Born: Roland Dobrushin, Soviet mathematician, in Leningrad (d. 1995)

== Sunday, July 21, 1929 ==
- The French Chamber of Deputies narrowly ratified the Mellon–Berenger Agreement of 1926 by a vote of 300 to 292. The bill now went to the senate.

== Monday, July 22, 1929 ==
- The Sino-Soviet conflict began as Russia fired into Chinese territory near Pogranichny.
- China and the Soviet Union both informed U.S. Secretary of State Henry L. Stimson that they intended to abide by the Kellogg–Briand Pact as long as the other side didn't make the first move.
- Born: U. A. Fanthorpe, English poet (d. 2009)

== Tuesday, July 23, 1929 ==
- The Soviet Union agreed to meet China for peace talks.

== Wednesday, July 24, 1929 ==
- The Kellogg–Briand Pact went into effect.
- Chinese and Soviet representatives met in Changchun for negotiations.
- Lord Lloyd resigned as High Commissioner in Egypt at the request of the Labour government due to differences of opinion over Egyptian policy.
- The sensational murder trial of Ohio State University professor of veterinary medicine James H. Snook began in Columbus. Snook was accused of murdering a student he had been having an affair with. Snook had confessed to the killing but claimed to have been acting in self-defense.

== Thursday, July 25, 1929 ==
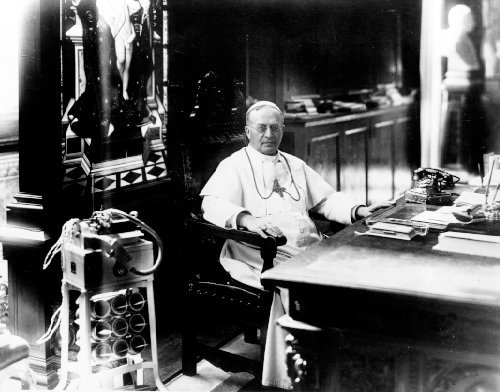
July 25, 1929: Pope Pius XI declares self no longer a "prisoner in the Vatican", goes into Saint Peter's Square

- Pope Pius XI celebrated Mass in St. Peter's Basilica and then made an historical entrance into St. Peter's Square as a crowd of approximately 200,000 cheered the end of the pope's status as a "prisoner in the Vatican" (Prigioniero nel Vaticano or Captivus Vaticani. For almost 59 years, beginning with the unification of Italy in 1870 and the annexation of Rome into the Kingdom of Italy, five popes (Pius IX, Leo XIII, Pius X, Benedict XV and Pius XI) had refused to venture outside the walls of Vatican City or even to appear at the balcony of the Vatican Basilica to face Saint Peter's Square, as a gesture of refusing to accept the authority of the Italian government over the Vatican.
- Died: Doc Scurlock, 80, American cowboy and gunfighter of the Old West

== Friday, July 26, 1929 ==
- Raymond Poincaré resigned as Prime Minister of France due to ill health.
- An explosion on the British cruiser HMS Devonshire killed 19.
- A demonstration of 400 Chinese students outside the Soviet consulate in Shanghai turned into a riot. One student was shot and a Japanese policeman was wounded.

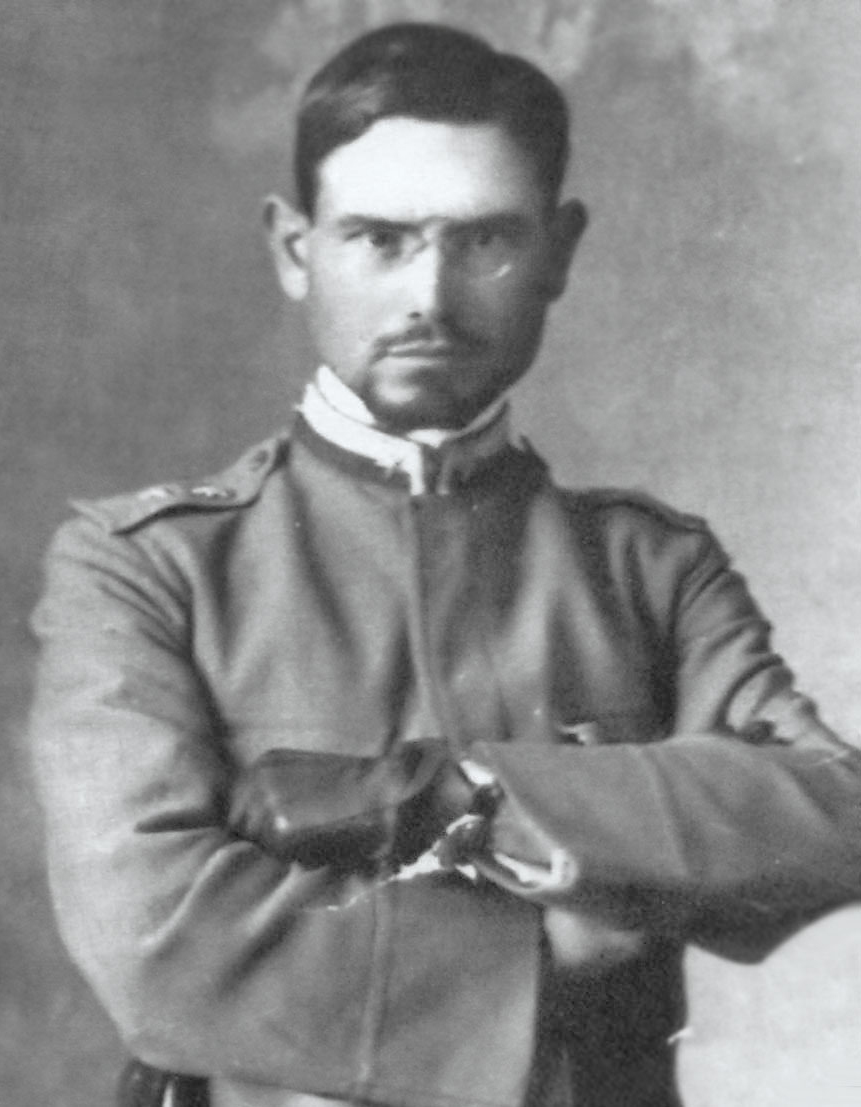
Lussu, no longer a prisoner on the island of Lipari

- Italian political prisoners Emilio Lussu, Francesco Fausto Nitti and Carlo Rosselli escaped from exile on the island of Lipari in a daring plane rescue from the island shore. Eventually they made their way to Paris to join other exiled anti-Fascist activists.
- 10 died in a heat wave across Italy as temperatures surpassed 100 degrees Fahrenheit.
- Born: Charlie Persip, American jazz drummer, in Morristown, New Jersey (d. 2020)

== Saturday, July 27, 1929 ==
- The Geneva Convention of 1929, drawn up by the International Committee of the Red Cross as a supplement to the provisions in the Hague Conventions of 1899 and 1907 regarding the humane treatment of prisoners of war, was signed by representatives of 37 nations in Switzerland in Geneva. Among the world's superpowers agreeing to the Convention were the U.S., the UK, France, Germany and Italy. It would take effect on June 19, 1931 after being ratified by 14 nations.

== Sunday, July 28, 1929 ==
- Maurice De Waele of Belgium won the Tour de France.
- A prison riot broke out at Auburn State Prison in New York. Four guards were shot, two inmates were killed, and four escaped.
- The 16th World Zionist Congress opened in Zürich, Switzerland.
- Born: Jacqueline Kennedy Onassis, First Lady of the United States, in Southampton, New York (d. 1994)
  - Indu Mitha, Pakistani dancer and choreographer (d. 2026)

== Monday, July 29, 1929 ==
- Aristide Briand became Prime Minister of France for the sixth time.
- 500,000 cotton workers in Britain went on strike in protest of their wages being cut by 12.5 percent.
- Died: Mary Jane Cain, 85, Aboriginal Australian human right activist

== Tuesday, July 30, 1929 ==
- The world flight endurance record was extended by a full week when a Curtiss Robin landed after completing more than 17 days in the air over St. Louis, Missouri.
- Born: Sid Krofft, Canadian-born American puppeteer and television producer, in Montreal, Canada (d. 2026)

== Wednesday, July 31, 1929 ==
- Troops were massed in the capitals of countries all over Europe over fears that communists would stage general strikes and riotous demonstrations on August 1 to mark International Red Day.
- The American children's magazine The Youth's Companion ceased to exist after 102 years as its merger with rival publication The American Boy was announced.
- Born: Pat Cooper, American actor and comedian (d. 2023) and Don Murray (actor), American actor (d. 2024)
