= Argus =

Argus is the Latinized form of the Greek word Argos. It may refer to:

== Greek mythology ==
- Argus (mythology), several figures from Greek mythology, including:
  - Argus (king of Argos), son of Zeus (or Phoroneus) and Niobe
  - Argus (Argonaut), builder of the ship in the tale of the Argonauts
  - Argus Panoptes (Argus "All-Eyes"), a giant with a hundred eyes
  - Argos (dog), faithful hunting dog of Odysseus

== Arts and entertainment ==
=== Fictional entities ===
- Argus (comics), in the DC Comics Universe
- Argus (Mortal Kombat), a deity
- ARGUS (Splinter Cell), a military contractor
- A.R.G.U.S., a government agency in the DC Universe
- Argus Filch, in the Harry Potter series
- Argus, a planet in the Warcraft franchise
- Argus, a hero in Mobile Legends: Bang Bang
- Argus, in the video game Shadow of the Colossus
- KNRB-0 Argus, a weapons platform in the game Vanquish
- The Manhattan Argus, a newspaper in the film The Hudsucker Proxy
- Argus, a major city in Mistral, a kingdom from the RWBY series

=== Games ===
- Argus (video game), 1986, by NMK
- Argus no Senshi, the original Japanese title for the arcade game Rygar

=== Music ===
- Argus (album), 1972, by Wishbone Ash
- "The Argus", a song by Ween from Quebec

=== Television ===
- "Argus" (30 Rock), a 2010 episode
- Argus (TV series), a Norwegian TV debate series that aired between 1993 and 1994

== Businesses ==
- Argus (camera company), a camera manufacturer
- Argus Brewery, a brewing company in Chicago, Illinois
- Argus Corporation, a Canadian holding company
- Argus Media, a business information company
- Argos (retailer), a British catalogue retailer

== Places ==
=== Iran ===
- Argus, Iran, a village in Kerman Province

=== Spain ===
- Argos (river), in the region of Murcia

=== United States ===
- Argus, California, an unincorporated community
- Argus, Pennsylvania, an unincorporated community
- Argus Range, a mountain range in Inyo County, California

== Publishing ==
See The Argus (disambiguation) for publications named "The Argus"

=== United Kingdom ===
- The Argus (Brighton), a newspaper serving Brighton and Hove, England; a member of the Newsquest Media Group
- South Wales Argus, published in Newport, South Wales; a member of the Newsquest Media Group
- Argus Press, a British publishing company
- Telegraph and Argus, a newspaper serving Bradford and surrounding areas

=== United States ===
- Barre Montpelier Times Argus, a daily morning newspaper serving the capital region of Vermont
- Carlsbad Current-Argus, a New Mexico newspaper
- Livingston County Daily Press & Argus, a newspaper that covers Livingston County, Michigan
- The Dispatch / The Rock Island Argus, American newspaper that covers the Quad Cities in Illinois and Iowa
- Argus Leader, American newspaper that covers Sioux Falls, South Dakota
- Argus, a newspaper in Albany, New York, which long functioned as the organ of the Albany Regency
- Argus, Midwood High School's school newspaper

=== Elsewhere ===
- The Argus (Dundalk), a newspaper serving Dundalk, Ireland; a member of the Independent News & Media group also known as Independent.ie
- The Argus (Melbourne), former Australian newspaper of record, established in 1846 and closed in 1957
- Cape Argus, a newspaper printed in Cape Town, South Africa
- Weekend Argus, a newspaper in South Africa, owned by Independent News & Media
- Goondiwindi Argus, a newspaper in Goondiwindi, Queensland, Australia, owned by Fairfax Media

== Sport ==
- Argus finals system, used in Australian rules football in the early 20th century
- Cape Argus Cycle Race in South Africa, colloquially referred to as "The Argus"

== Science and technology ==
=== Biology ===
- Argus (bird), pheasants from the genera Argusianus and Rheinartia
- Argus butterflies, including:
  - Nymphalidae, e.g., Erebia, Junonia
  - Polyommatinae (Lycaenidae), e.g., as Aricia, Plebeius, Polyommatus
  - Theclinae (Lycaenidae): the invalid genus Argus (described by Gerhard, 1850), now in Satyrium
- Argus monitor (Varanus panoptes), a species of lizard
- Scatophagus argus, a species of fish of the family Scatophagidae
- Terebra argus, a mollusk of the family Terebridae

=== Electronics and computing ===
- Argus (monitoring software), a network and systems monitoring application
- Argus (programming language), an extension of the CLU language
- Argus - Audit Record Generation and Utilization System, a network auditing system
- Argus retinal prosthesis, a bionic eye implant manufactured by Second Sight
- Ferranti Argus, a line of industrial control computers
- ARGUS-IS, a surveillance system produced by BAE Systems
- Honeywell ARGUS, a low-level computer programming language

=== Other uses in science and technology ===
- Argus (camera company), a brand of camera
- Argus Coastal Monitoring, a video system for observing coastal processes and related phenomena
- ARGUS distribution, a probability distribution used in particle physics
- Argus Motoren, a German aircraft engine manufacturing firm
- ARGUS reactor, a nuclear reactor at the Russian Kurchatov Institute
- Operation Argus, a 1958 US military effort to create orbital electron belts using atomic bombs
- ARGUS (experiment), a particle physics experiment at DESY
- Project Argus, a project to search for extraterrestrial intelligence

== Vehicles ==
=== Aircraft ===
- Fairchild Argus, a British version of the UC-61 Forwarder transport aircraft
- Canadair CP-107 Argus, a Royal Canadian Air Force maritime patrol aircraft
- Saab 340 AEW&C, designated the S 100B Argus by the Swedish Air Force

=== Named vessels ===
- French brig Argus (1800), a French naval ship that took part in the Battle of Trafalgar
- HMS Argus, the name of many ships in the British Royal Navy
- RFA Argus (A135), a 1981 Primary Casualty Receiving Ship in Britain's Royal Fleet Auxiliary
- USS Argus, various ships of the US Navy
- Argus, a steel-hulled ship lost in the Great Lakes Storm of 1913

=== Other vehicles ===
- Argus (automobile), a German automobile manufactured between 1901 and 1909

== See also ==
- The Argus (disambiguation), the name of several newspapers
- Argeus (disambiguation)
- Argo (disambiguation)
- Argos (disambiguation)
