= Argo (disambiguation) =

The Argo is the ship captained by Jason in Greek mythology.

Argo may also refer to:

== Places ==
=== United States ===
- Argo, Alabama, a town
- Argo, Georgia, a ghost town
- Argo, Illinois, a subdivision of Summit
- Argo, Iowa, a census-designated place
- Argo, Kentucky, an unincorporated community
- Argo, Missouri, an unincorporated community
- Argo, Nebraska, a ghost town

=== Elsewhere ===
- Argo (crater), on Mars
- Argo, Saskatchewan, Canada, an unincorporated community or siding
- Argo District, Badakhshan Province, Afghanistan
- Argo Glacier, Miller Range, Antarctica
- Argo Island, Nile River, Sudan
- Argo Point, a headland in Graham Land, Antarctica
- Lake Harku or Argo, Estonia
- Name for Argos, Greece, in (Curiate) Italian, also as Latin Catholic (now titular) diocese
- Argo Abyssal Plain, Indian Ocean off North Australia

== People ==
- Argo (name), a list of people with the surname or given name
- Argo, a ring name of German wrestler Achim Albrecht
- Argo, a football player for the Toronto Argonauts of the Canadian Football League

== Arts and entertainment ==
- Argo (Liberman), a 1974 abstract sculpture by Alexander Liberman

=== Fictional entities ===
- Argo, a spaceship in the TV series Star Blazers
- Argo, a shuttlecraft/all-terrain vehicle on the USS Enterprise (NCC-1701-E)
- Argo, a character in Sword Art Online
- Argo City, a city in the DC Comics universe
- Argo the Almighty, a character who appeared in the Marvel Comics' MC2 series A-Next
- Argo, one of the dogs in the myth of Actaeon

=== Films ===
- Argo (2006 film), a short film by Jordan Bayne
- Argo (2012 film), a feature film directed by and starring Ben Affleck, about a fictional film of the same name used for a CIA cover story

=== Music ===
- Argo (band), a Greek band
- Argo Records (UK), a defunct British record label
- Argo Records, a defunct subsidiary of Chess Records, based in the United States
- Argo (film score), the film score of the 2012 film starring Ben Affleck

== Brands and enterprises ==
- Argo, a brand of corn starch owned by Associated British Foods
- Argo Hotel, Crofton, Nebraska, on the US National Register of Historic Places
- Argo Investments Ltd, an Australian investment company
- Argo Medical, developer of the ReWalk walking device
- Argo (Italian company), an Italian company that manufactures or distributes agricultural equipment
- Argo (Danish company), a Danish waste management company
- Argo Tea, Chicago-based tea shop
- Benelli Argo, a rifle

== Computing ==
- Argo Project (software), a family of tools for running and delivering software on Kubernetes
- Argo (web browser), a web browser developed in 1994 by Bert Bos
- Argo, a computer game by Kure Software Koubou
- Zune or Argo, a Microsoft digital media store
- Argo (video game), a 2017 video game developed by Bohemia Interactive

== Transport ==
=== Air and space ===
- Argo (NASA spacecraft), a proposed spacecraft mission
- Argo (Russian spacecraft), a proposed Russian spacecraft
- Alliance A-1 Argo, an American two-seat biplane of the late 1920s
- ArGo Airways, a Greek regional airline
- Direct Fly ArGO, a Czech microlight aircraft design

=== Terrain ===
- Argo (automobile), a defunct American automobile company
- Argo (1863–1892), one of the eight South Devon Railway Dido class steam locomotives
- Argo AI, an autonomous car development company affiliated with Ford Motor Company and Volkswagen Group
- Argo Bromo Anggrek, an Indonesian executive class train travelling from Jakarta to Surabaya
- Argo Electric, an electric vehicle built from 1912 to 1916 in Saginaw, Michigan
- Argo Jati, an Indonesian semi-executive class train travelling from Jakarta to Cirebon
- Argo Racing Cars, a British constructor of racing cars
- Fiat Argo, a subcompact car produced by Fiat

=== Water ===
- Argo (ship), any one of at least four civilian surface vessels of that name
- Argo (ROV), an unmanned submersible used by Robert Ballard to discover the wreck of RMS Titanic
- Argo-class submarine, operated by the Italian Regia Marina (Royal Navy) in World War II
  - Italian submarine Argo (1936), a submarine of the Italian Argo class
- French submarine Argo (Q151), a submarine which served in the French Navy from 1933 to 1946
- HMS Argo, five ships of the Royal Navy
- Italian ship Argo (MEN209), a 1971 presidential yacht of the Italian Navy
- USCGC Argo (WPC-100), a US Coast Guard patrol boat
- USS Snatch or M/V Argo, a research vessel

=== Other transport ===
- Argo (ATV manufacturer), an amphibious ATV/UTV manufactured in New Hamburg, Canada
- Argo D-4, a rocket
- Argo Transit, an on-demand public transit service in Ontario, Canada

== Other uses ==
- Argo (dog) (c. 2010 – 2024), a free-ranging Italian dog
- Argo (oceanography), an oceanographic project
- Argo Community High School, Summit, Illinois
- RC Argo, a rugby club in Kyiv, Ukraine
- Task Force Argo, an American volunteer group which has evacuated people from Afghanistan since 2021
- L'Argo, a newspaper published in Malta in 1804
- Argo Dam, a dam in Ann Arbor, Michigan, United States
- Argo Gold Mine and Mill, a former gold mine in Idaho Springs, Colorado, United States
- Argo Tunnel, a mine drainage and access tunnel in Idaho Springs, Colorado

== See also ==
- Argos (disambiguation)
- ArgoUML, an open source designing application
- Argus (disambiguation)
