= Argos =

Argos most often refers to:

- Argos, Peloponnese, a city in Argolis, Greece
- Argos (retailer), in the UK

Argos or ARGOS may also refer to:

== Businesses ==
- Argos Comunicación, a Mexican television and film company
- Argos Energies, a Dutch oil and gas company
- Grupo Argos, a Colombian cement and energy conglomerate

== Places ==
=== Greece ===
- Argos, Peloponnese, a city in Argolis
  - Argos-Mykines, the municipality
- Argos (Nisyros), an ancient settlement on Nisyros island
- Amphilochian Argos, an ancient settlement in Amphilochia
- Argos Orestiko, a town in Kastoria
- Argos Pelasgikon, an ancient settlement in Thessaly

=== Other countries ===
- Argos (river), in Spain
- Argos, Indiana, US, a town

=== Fictional places ===
- Argos (Conan), a fictional nation in the world of Conan the Barbarian
- Argos (Stargate), a fictional planet in the Stargate SG-1 universe

== Science and technology ==
- Argos (EGFR Inhibitor), a protein in Drosophila melanogaster
- ARGOS (optics system), a multi-star optics system
- ARGOS (satellite), an American research and development space mission
- Argos (satellite system), a satellite-based system for environmental data collection
- ARGOS DSS, a decision support system for crisis management

== Vehicles ==
- Argos-class patrol boat, a ship class of the Portuguese Navy
- Argos Georgia, a fishing vessel that sunk in 2024 off the Falkland Islands
- BRM Argos, a Portuguese microlight aircraft
- Renault Argos, a concept car

== Other uses ==
- Argus (Greek myth), several characters in Greek mythology
- Argos (dog), Odysseus' dog in the Odyssey
- Argos (radio program), a Dutch documentary series
- Eddie Argos (born 1979), English musician
- Argos-Shimano, a former cycling team
- Task Force Argos, a branch of the Queensland Police Service
- Toronto Argonauts or Argos, a Canadian Football League team
- Minister Argos, a villain from the manga and anime Great Mazinger

== See also ==
- Agros (disambiguation)
- Argo (disambiguation)
- Argos Hill (disambiguation)
- Argosy (disambiguation)
- Argus (disambiguation)
