= Mount Argus =

Mount Argus may refer to:

- Mount Argus, Antarctica, three-peaked mountain in Palmer Land, Antarctica
- Mount Argus monastery, Harold's Cross, Dublin, Ireland
  - Charles of Mount Argus, monk based at the monastery

== See also ==
- Argus Mountain, Vancouver Island, British Columbia, Canada
- Argus Range, mountain range located in Inyo County, California, USA
- Argos Hill (disambiguation)
- Argus (disambiguation)
