= The Argus =

The Argus may refer to:

== Publications ==
=== Australia ===
- The Argus (Melbourne), a defunct newspaper in Melbourne, Australia
- The Northern Argus, the original name of The Evening News (Rockhampton), Queensland
- The Northern Argus, Clare, South Australia
- The Southern Argus, Strathalbyn, South Australia

=== United Kingdom ===
- The Argus (Brighton), a newspaper in Brighton and Hove, East Sussex, England
- South Wales Argus, known locally as The Argus, a daily tabloid newspaper published in Newport, Wales
- Telegraph & Argus a newspaper in Bradford, West Yorkshire, England

=== United States ===
Listed alphabetically by state

- The Argus, an Arizona newspaper published 1895–1900 in Holbrook, Arizona
- The Argus (Fremont), a newspaper in the San Francisco Bay Area, California
- The Wesleyan Argus, the student-run newspaper of Wesleyan University in Middletown, Connecticut
- The Argus, the student-run newspaper of Illinois Wesleyan University in Bloomington, Illinois
- The Argus, a literary magazine of Northwestern State University in Louisiana
- St. Louis Argus, originally The Argus, a newspaper focused on African American issues founded in 1912 in St. Louis, Missouri
- The Carlsbad Current-Argus, Carlsbad, New Mexico
- The Hillsboro Argus, a defunct newspaper in Hillsboro, Oregon
- Argus Observer, a newspaper in Ontario, Oregon
- Argus Leader, a newspaper in Sioux Falls, South Dakota
- Barre Montpelier Times Argus, Barre, Vermont
- Virginia Argus, common name of the Virginia Argus and Hampshire Advertiser, a defunct weekly newspaper published in Romney, Virginia
- The Argus (Seattle), a defunct newspaper in Seattle, Washington

=== Other places ===
- The Argus, the former name of the Cape Argus, a newspaper in Cape Town, South Africa
- The Argus (Dundalk), a newspaper in Dundalk, Ireland
- The Argus (Thunder Bay), a student newspaper of Lakehead University, in Thunder Bay, Ontario, Canada

== Other ==
- The Argus, the common name of a major cycling event in South Africa, the Cape Argus Cycle Tour
- "The Argus", a song by Ween from their album Quebec

== See also ==
- Argus (disambiguation)
- Argus Panoptes (the mythological all-seeing giant)
