= September 1928 =

Month of 1928

<<	September 1928					>>
Su	Mo	Tu	We	Th	Fr	Sa
						1
2	3	4	5	6	7	8
9	10	11	12	13	14	15
16	17	18	19	20	21	22
23	24	25	26	27	28	29
30

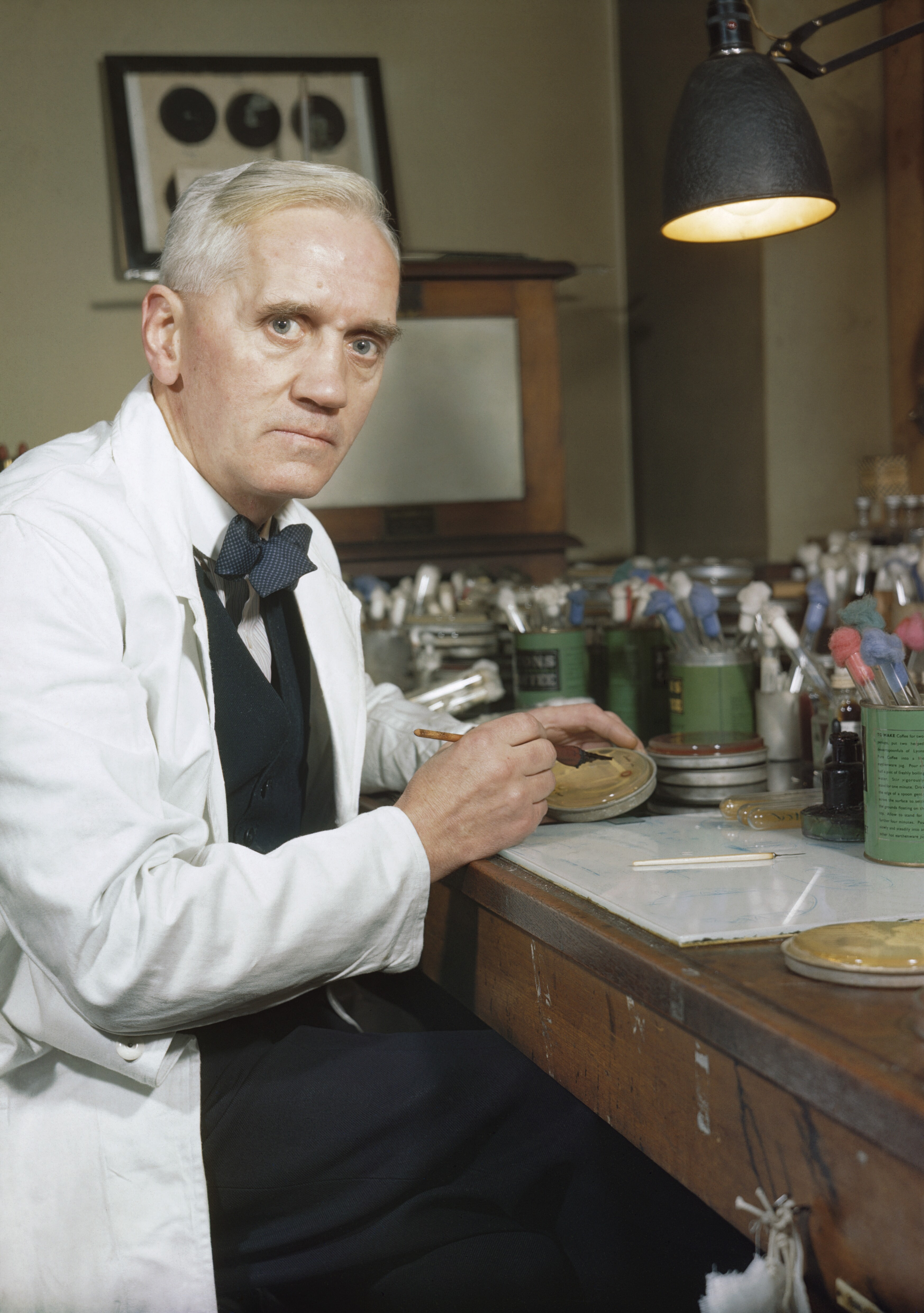
September 3, 1928: Alexander Fleming (pictured in 1943) serendipidtously discovers the first antibiotic, penicillin

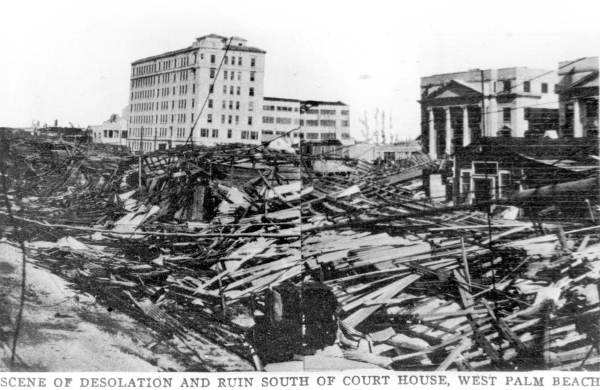
September 12 to 18, 1928: Okeechobee Hurricane kills over 1,601 in Caribbean and over 2,500 in Florida

The following events occurred in September 1928:

== September 1, 1928 (Saturday) ==
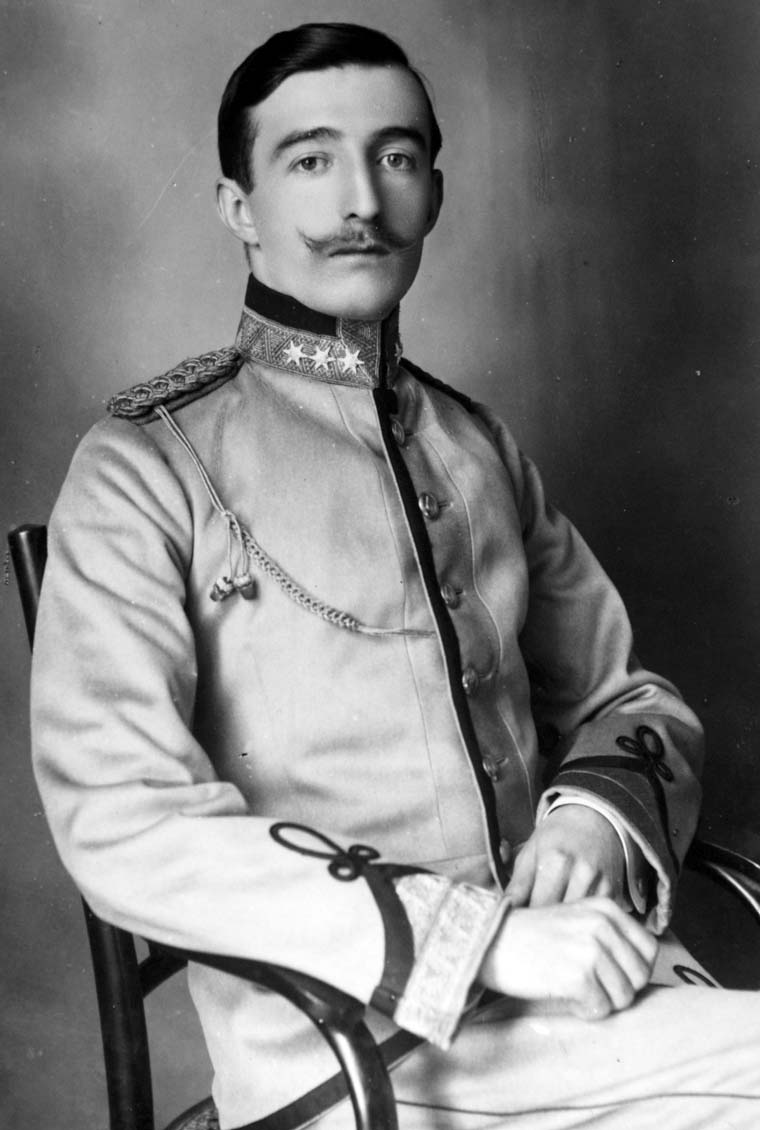
King Zog the First of Albania

- Ahmet Zogu was crowned King Zog as Albania changed from a republic to a monarchy.
- The partly talking aviation-themed film The Air Circus premiered at the Gaiety Theatre in New York City.
- Died: Patrick Joseph James Keane, 56, American Catholic bishop

== September 2, 1928 (Sunday) ==
- King Zog carried out his first official acts, freeing 2,000 prisoners and granting one month's worth of bonus salary to all civil servants. Italy became the first country to recognize the new regime.
- Born: Mel Stuart, film director and producer, in New York City (d. 2012)

== September 3, 1928 (Monday) ==
- Scottish biologist Alexander Fleming accidentally discovered penicillin when he returned to his lab after a summer holiday to find that the Staphylococcus aureus bacteria that had once been in a Petri dish had apparently been killed off by a Penicillium mould.
- Born: Gaston Thorn, Prime Minister of Luxembourg, 1974 to 1979, and President of the European Commission, 1981-1985; in Luxembourg City (d. 2007)

== September 4, 1928 (Tuesday) ==
- The cornerstone to a new addition to the Deutsches Museum in Munich was laid during a ceremony attended by President Paul von Hindenburg.
- Born:
  - Suzanne Débarbat, French astronomer and historian of science and technology, in Montluçon, France (d. 2024)
  - Dick York, American film and TV actor known for the TV series Bewitched; in Fort Wayne, Indiana (d. 1992)
- Died: Fred Bretonnel, 23, French lightweight boxer, hanged himself

== September 5, 1928 (Wednesday) ==
- Kostaq Kota became the new Prime Minister of Albania.
- Germany submitted new proposals to France hoping to end the occupation of the Rhineland.
- A Mexican general said that the army would choose the provisional President of Mexico owing to the assassination of president-elect Álvaro Obregón.
- Born:
  - Walter Breen, American numismatist, in San Antonio, Texas (d. 1993)
  - Damayanti Joshi, Indian dancer, in Bombay (d. 2004)
  - Albert Mangelsdorff, German jazz trombonist, in Frankfurt (d. 2005)

== September 6, 1928 (Thursday) ==
- The National Lutheran Editors' Association passed a resolution declaring that "the peculiar allegiance that a faithful Catholic owes toward a foreign sovereign may clash with the best interests of the country", referring to the Roman Catholicism of presidential candidate Al Smith.
- The talking horror film The Terror was released.
- Born:
  - Robert M. Pirsig, American writer and philosopher, known for Zen and the Art of Motorcycle Maintenance; in Minneapolis (d. 2017)
  - Yevgeny Svetlanov, Soviet Russian conductor of the USSR State Symphony Orchestra from 1965 to 2000, composer and pianist; in Moscow (d. 2002)
  - Sid Watkins, British neurosurgeon, in Liverpool (d. 2012)

== September 7, 1928 (Friday) ==
- Opera singer Frances Alda publicly disclosed that she was filing for divorce from manager Giulio Gatti-Casazza after 18 years of marriage.
- Mobster Antonio Lombardo was shot dead in broad daylight on a busy Chicago street corner. The assassins ran into the crowd and escaped. One of Lombardo's bodyguards was also shot.
- The Order of the Red Banner of Labour was established in the Soviet Union.
- The Sophie Treadwell play Machinal premiered at the Plymouth Theatre on Broadway.
- Born:
  - Donald Henderson, physician and epidemiologist who directed the international effort to eradicate smallpox; in Lakewood, Ohio (d. 2016)
  - Al McGuire, American college basketball coach, Basketball Hall of Fame honoree; in New York City (d. 2001)
- Died: Antonio Lombardo, 36, Italian-born American mobster nicknamed "Tony the Scourge", was shot to death in Chicago in retaliation for the murder of gangster Frankie Yale

== September 8, 1928 (Saturday) ==
- The engagement of actress Joan Crawford and actor Douglas Fairbanks, Jr. was announced.

== September 9, 1928 (Sunday) ==
- Six convicts were killed in an attempted jailbreak from Louisiana State Penitentiary. Two inmates escaped.
- One of Antonio Lombardo's bodyguards, Joe Ferraro, died of bullet wounds sustained in the Lombardo assassination of two days previous. He refused to tell anyone anything he might have known about who was behind the shooting and why.
- Born: Sol LeWitt, American conceptual artist; in Hartford, Connecticut (d. 2007)
- Died: Urban Shocker, 38, American baseball pitcher, died of heart failure three months after his last appearance in a major league game

== September 10, 1928 (Monday) ==
- The Republican Party swept gubernatorial and senate elections in Maine, a good omen of national victory for the G.O.P. in November.
- Clarence Chamberlin inaugurated daily seaplane passenger service between City Pier A in New York City and Hoover Field in Washington, D.C. The passenger fare was $40 one-way or $60 for a round trip.
- The oil industry of Argentina was nationalized.

== September 11, 1928 (Tuesday) ==
- WGY of Schenectady, New York, transmitted the first live play ever broadcast on television. The only viewers were journalists watching the program on a 3-inch x 3-inch screen three miles away. The small screen size and low resolution meant that only the faces of the actors were shown.
- Ty Cobb of the Philadelphia Athletics played in the final game of his major league career. Pinch-hitting in the ninth inning against the New York Yankees, he popped out to shortstop Mark Koenig.
- A recording which lasted three minutes and fifty-three seconds by the Columbia Graphophone Company was made at half past two in Leicester Square. The disc was a 12-inch 78 rpm disc made the same year in association with the Daily Mail Newspaper. A man named Commander Daniel can be heard narrating, as well as various urban traffic noises, including but not limited to horse-drawn vehicles and motor vehicles.
- Born:
  - Earl Holliman, Golden Globe winning American TV and film actor; in Delhi, Louisiana (d. 2024)
  - William X. Kienzle, American Roman Catholic priest who created the "Father Robert Koesler" series of mystery novels; in Detroit (d. 2001)

== September 12, 1928 (Wednesday) ==
- The Philip Dunning play Night Hostess premiered on Broadway at the Martin Beck Theatre.
- The island of Guadeloupe was hit by a devastating hurricane that killed over 1,200 residents before moving northward.

== September 13, 1928 (Thursday) ==
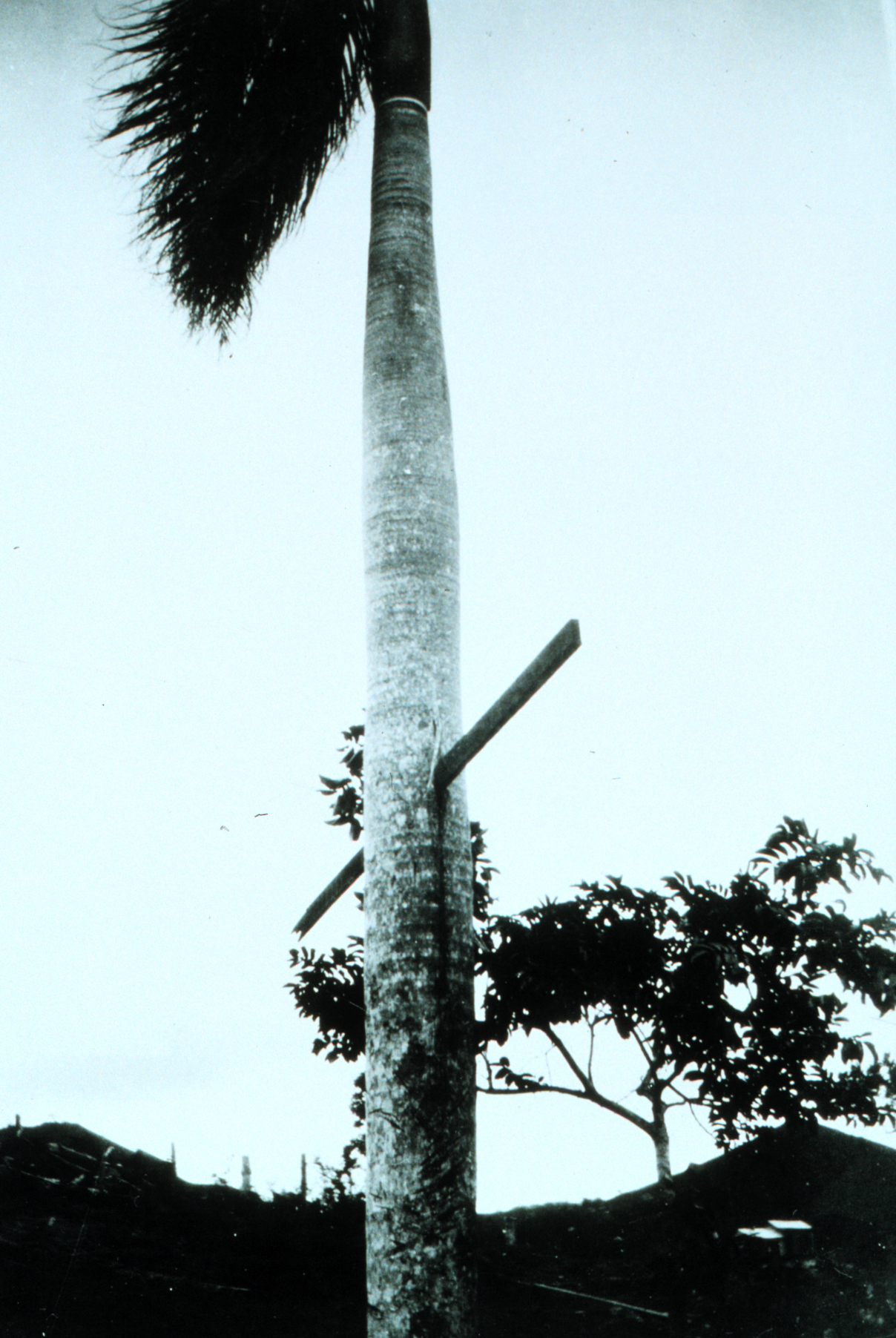
An example of the damage in Puerto Rico

- The Okeechobee hurricane killed 312 people and left tens of thousands homeless in Puerto Rico.
- Eight people were killed by a tornado in northeastern Nebraska.
- Born: Robert Indiana (Robert Clark), American pop artist; in New Castle, Indiana (d. 2018)
- Died: Italo Svevo (pen name of Aron Hector Schmitz), 66, Italian novelist and businessman

== September 14, 1928 (Friday) ==
- A tornado in Rockford, Illinois, killed 14 people.
- France and Germany agreed to the creation of a European commission that would fix a final reparations figure as well as the method and rate of payment.

== September 15, 1928 (Saturday) ==
- The Okeechobee hurricane hit the Bahamas.
- Al Capone accidentally shot himself with his own pistol when getting into a car after a game of golf in Burnham, Illinois.
- Born: Cannonball Adderley (Julian Edwin Adderley), American jazz saxophonist; in Tampa, Florida (d. 1975)

== September 16, 1928 (Sunday) ==
- The Okeechobee hurricane made landfall in southern Florida between Jupiter and Fort Lauderdale.
- The silent drama film The Docks of New York, starring George Bancroft and Betty Compson, was released.
- Died: Theodore Andrea Cook, 61, British art critic and writer

== September 17, 1928 (Monday) ==
- The area around Lake Okeechobee in southern Florida was devastated by the Okeechobee hurricane, in a Category 4 storm that killed over 2,500 people in that U.S. state.
- Died: Bokusui Wakayama, 43, Japanese author

== September 18, 1928 (Tuesday) ==
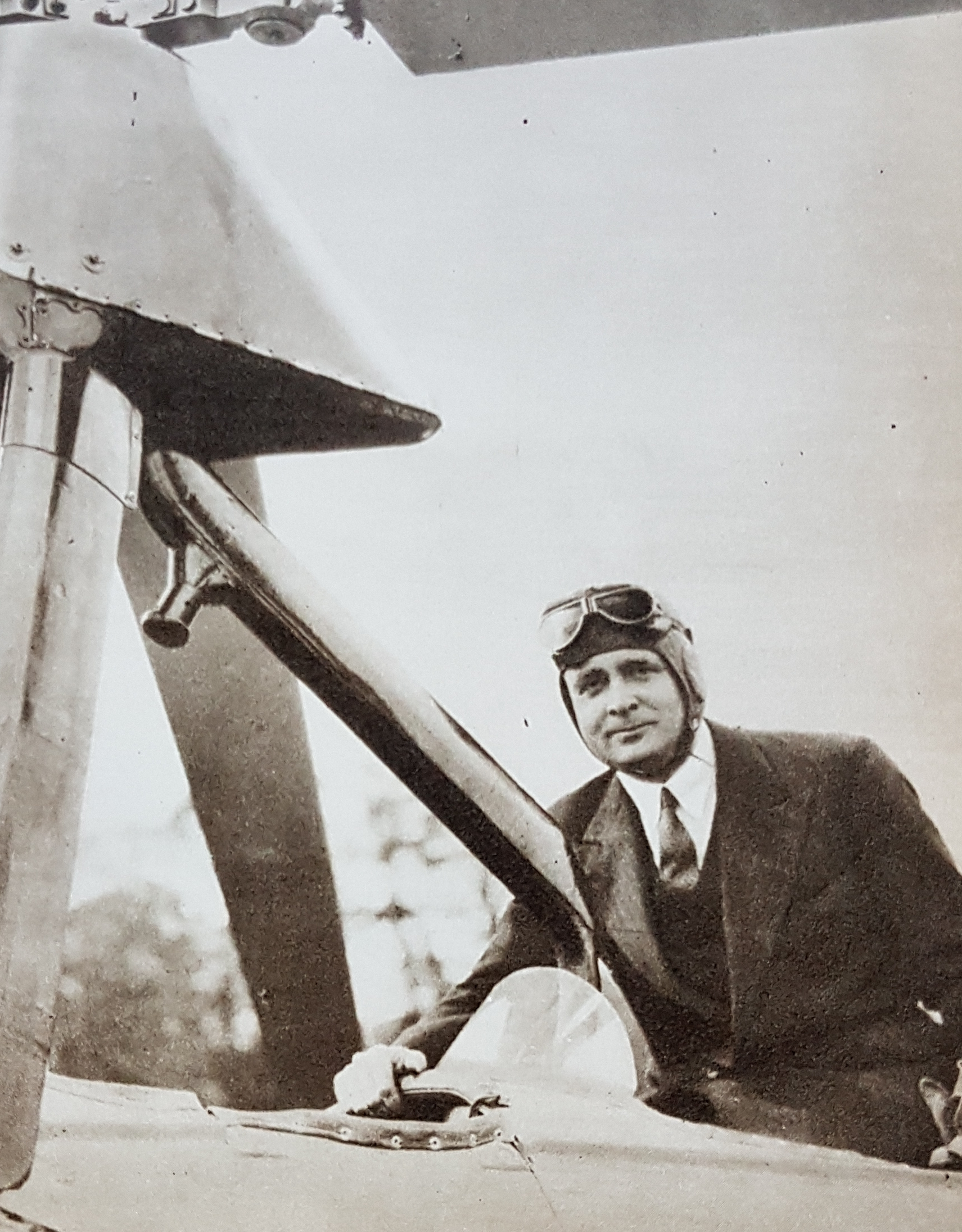
Cierva and an autogyro

- Spanish aeronautical engineer Juan de la Cierva became the first person to cross the English Channel in a helicopter, piloting his invention, the autogyro.
- Died: John Lambton, 3rd Earl of Durham, 73, British peer

== September 19, 1928 (Wednesday) ==
- The partly talking Al Jolson film The Singing Fool premiered at the Winter Garden Theatre in New York City.
- Construction began on the Chrysler Building in New York City.
- The Grand Council of Fascism became the supreme body of the state in Italy.
- Born: Adam West, American TV actor best known for his portrayal of Batman in the TV series of the same name; in Walla Walla, Washington (d. 2017)

== September 20, 1928 (Thursday) ==
- Al Smith made an important campaign speech in Oklahoma City denouncing intolerance and addressing the issue of his religion directly. Smith said that he owed it to the country to discuss "frankly and openly" the "attempt of Senator Owen and the forces behind him to inject bigotry, hatred, intolerance and un-American sectarian division" into the campaign. Smith called it "sad" that "in view of countless billions of dollars we have poured into the cause of public education, to see some American citizens proclaiming themselves hundred percent American and then in the very document in which they make that proclamation suggesting that I be defeated for the presidency because of my religious belief." Smith also called the Ku Klux Klan "totally ignorant of the history and traditions of this country and its institutions."
- Born:
  - Donald Hall, Poet Laureate of the United States for 2006-2007; in Hamden, Connecticut (d. 2018)
  - Ruth Richard, American female baseball player with eight seasons in the AAGPBL; in Argus, Pennsylvania (d. 2018)

== September 21, 1928 (Friday) ==
- The second and last round of elections for the lower house of the Parliament of Sweden, the Andra kammaren. The Socialdemokratiska Arbetareparti, led by Per Albin Hansson, lost 14 seats but remained the largest party, with 90 of the 230 seats.
- U.S. President Calvin Coolidge made the Brave Little State of Vermont speech.
- Al Jolson and Ruby Keeler were secretly married in Port Chester, New York.
- The Fox Theatre opened in Detroit.

== September 22, 1928 (Saturday) ==
- Tax liens were levied against the property of Ralph Capone for failing to pay tax on all of his income.
- The Buster Keaton silent comedy film The Cameraman was released.
- The sound film Beggars of Life was released.
- Born: James Lawson, activist and professor, in Uniontown, Pennsylvania (d. 2024)

== September 23, 1928 (Sunday) ==
- More than 300 people died in a theater fire in Madrid, Spain.
- The Greek and Italian governments signed a treaty of friendship.

== September 24, 1928 (Monday) ==
- The French government denied a report in the Soviet newspaper Krasnaya Zvezda claiming that France had made secret pacts with Britain.
- The chairman of the Palm Beach County Red Cross estimated the Florida death toll in the Okeechobee hurricane to be between 2,000 and 2,500.

== September 25, 1928 (Tuesday) ==
- Emilio Portes Gil was named the next President of Mexico in a joint session of both the Senate and Chamber of Deputies.
- Died: Karl Schneider, 23, Australian cricketer, from leukemia

== September 26, 1928 (Wednesday) ==
- The government of Swedish Prime Minister Carl Gustaf Ekman resigned after key members lost seats in the recent election, most notably Foreign Minister Eliel Löfgren.
- Chinese pirates hijacked a British steamship in the Gulf of Tonkin and ransacked the cargo cases as well as the luggage of 1,400 passengers, making off with $40,000 U.S. in loot.
- The General Act for the Pacific Settlement of International Disputes was concluded in Geneva.
- An editorial in The Daily Telegraph criticized British diplomacy, saying secrecy in its recent naval pact dealings with France had aroused international suspicion.

== September 27, 1928 (Thursday) ==
- The United States publicly acknowledged that it had granted full diplomatic recognition to the Kuomintang as the government of China.
- The mayor of Flint, Michigan, William H. McKeighan, was arrested on charges of conspiracy to commit voting fraud.
- Eleanor Roosevelt, the chair of the Women's Advisory Committee of the Democratic National Committee, officially denied a rumor that Al Smith had appeared at a Boy Scout camp with the smell of alcohol on his breath.
- Died: Elias Molee, 83, American journalist, philologist and linguist

== September 28, 1928 (Friday) ==
- U.S. President Coolidge rejected the Anglo-French naval limitation plan, saying it would place the American navy at a "manifest disadvantage".
- The New York Yankees clinched the American League pennant with an 11–6 win over the Detroit Tigers at Navin Field.
- André Routis won the World Featherweight Title of boxing with a 15-round decision over Tony Canzoneri at Madison Square Garden.
- Born: Koko Taylor (stage name for Cora Anna Walton), American blues singer; in Shelby County, Tennessee (d. 2009)

== September 29, 1928 (Saturday) ==
- The St. Louis Cardinals clinched the National League pennant when the New York Giants were eliminated by losing 6–2 to the Chicago Cubs at the Polo Grounds.
- Died:
  - Arnold Kent (stage name for Lido Manetti), 29, Italian-born American actor, died in a car accident
  - Ernst Steinitz, 57, German mathematician

== September 30, 1928 (Sunday) ==
- One person was killed and about 200 injured in street fighting between communists and republicans in Hamburg in Germany.
- Born: Elie Wiesel, Romanian-born professor Holocaust survivor who led the successful search for escaped Nazi war criminals; in Sighet (d. 2016)
