= ShoreZone =

Mapping program that uses oblique aerial images acquired at low altitude

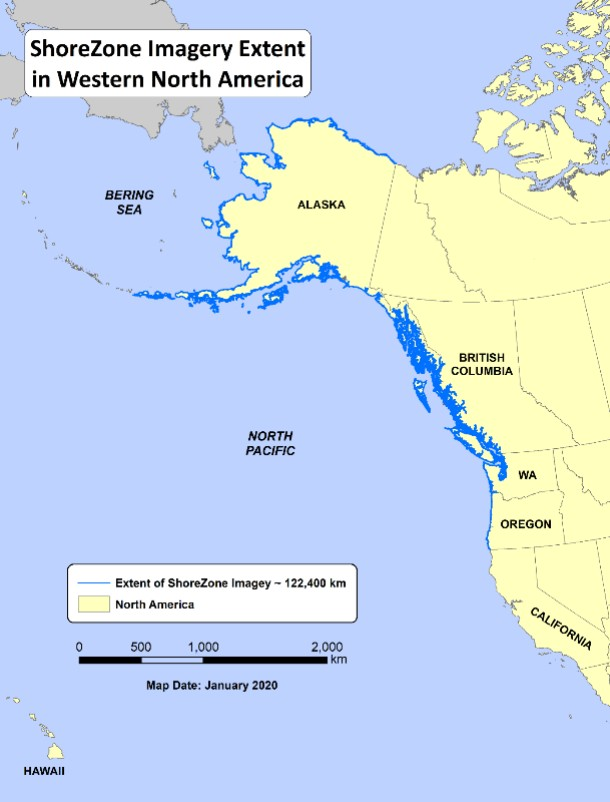
The ShoreZone program currently extends from Oregon to Alaska with spatially contiguous aerial imagery and habitat maps that are available online.

ShoreZone is a mapping program that acquires oblique aerial images at low altitude during the lowest daylight tides of the year to inventory alongshore and cross-shore geomorphological and biological features of the Pacific Northwest intertidal shoreline. Habitat attributes are interpreted from the aerial images and categorized in a geographic database. The mapping program was first developed as an oil spill response tool for British Columbia and now extends from Oregon to Alaska. Other programs such as the Washington State Coastal Atlas and the California Coastal Records Project are acquiring similar imagery. Uses of the spatial data include ecological studies, marine conservation planning, shoreline-erosion monitoring, coastal flooding and vulnerability assessments, climate change adaptation strategies and community education.

== Development ==
A ShoreZone imaging and mapping prototype was originally developed by Dr. Ed Owens and first demonstrated on Salt Spring Island, British Columbia, in 1979. A decade of further development resulted in the first protocols for the Physical Shore-zone Mapping System, published by the Ministry of Environment and Parks. A compatible biological classification was developed in the early 1990s, and the fully integrated biophysical mapping system was first applied to Gwaii Haanas National Park. British Columbia was imaged and mapped from 1991 to the present. Washington state was imaged and mapped between 1994 and 2000, and Oregon's coast was imaged in 2011 and mapped in 2013. The Alaska program began in 2001 when the Cook Inlet Regional Citizens Advisory Council contracted Coastal and Ocean Resources Inc. to image and map Cook Inlet. As of 2024, the mapping program consists of a spatially contiguous database of imagery and habitat attributes covering over 114,000 km (78,000 mi) of shoreline (see map).

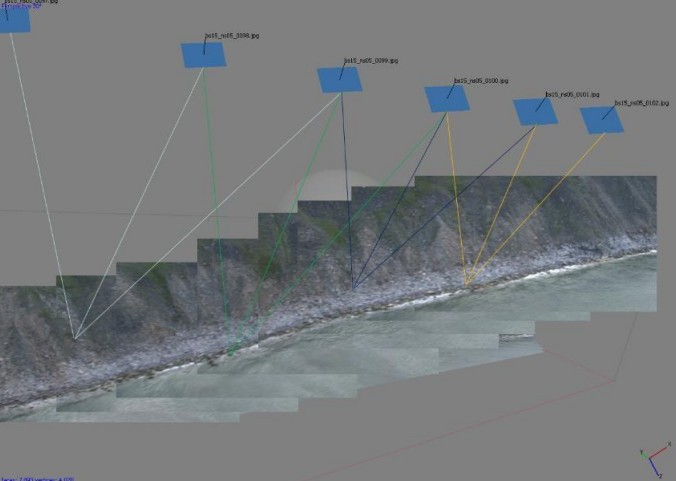
Acquiring aerial imagery for structure from motion processing.

In 2014, Dr. Carl Schoch of Coastwise Science pioneered the use of Structure From Motion (SfM), using Microsoft Photosynth to orthorectify ShoreZone oblique aerial imagery and to generate a point cloud representing imaged objects for producing three-dimensional models of shorelines. The concept was derived from Argus Coastal Monitoring Systems, which observe and quantitatively document coastal wave environments. These systems typically employ groups of fixed digital video cameras mounted with overlapping fields of view, taking consistently timed images of the nearshore zone that are merged and orthorectified in post-processing. The SfM technique differs fundamentally from conventional photogrammetry in that the geometry of the scene, camera positions and orientation are solved without the need to specify a priori a network of targets with known three-dimensional positions.

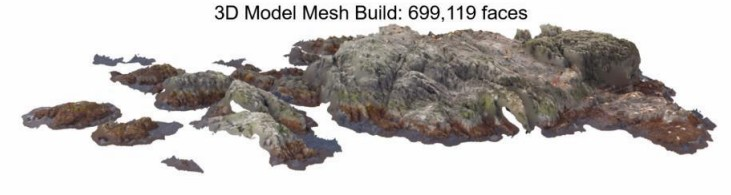
Image processing consists of photo alignment, generating orthophoto mosaics, wire frame construction of 3D point clouds, image draping onto the wire frame for 3D rendering.

Digital post-processing of ShoreZone imagery using SfM allows quantitative measurements of shoreline unit dimensions, percentage cover of substrate, macro epiflora and epifauna, and time-series assessments of shoreline change. In areas where temporal sequences of imagery exist—such as Cook Inlet, Alaska, and the north coast of British Columbia—time series are analyzed to quantify shoreline erosion or accretion, vulnerability to flooding in the context of sea level rise, and changing wave dynamics.

Since 2016, commercial software has been used to digitally process aerial images to create orthophoto mosaics and shoreline elevation models. ShoreZone imaging and mapping protocols were revised in 2016 to utilize these new technologies and original research by Dr. Schoch at Oregon State University. The Alaska portion of the ShoreZone database is now part of the Alaska Ocean Observing System and the Integrated Ocean Observing System.

== Partnership ==
The ShoreZone mapping program is maintained by a unique consortium with no binding agreement. The consortium currently consists of over 50 local, regional and national partners, including First Nations, various commercial industries, non-profits, and state, provincial and federal governments. This partnership was presented the 2009 Coastal America Spirit Award that recognizes collaborative efforts to protect and restore coastal environments and is presented by the Coastal America Partnership, which includes federal, state, and local agencies, as well as private organizations.

In the United States the Oregon ShoreZone program is supported by the Oregon Department of Fish and Wildlife and the Oregon Coastal Management Program. The Washington ShoreZone program is supported by the Washington State Department of Natural Resources. The Alaska ShoreZone program has ongoing support from the National Marine Fisheries Service (NMFS) of the National Oceanic and Atmospheric Administration(NOAA), which also manages and distributes the imagery and data. In Canada the British Columbia ShoreZone data are distributed by GeoBC. The Nature Conservancy coordinated the program until 2016.

== Utility ==
Coastal resource managers need an inventory of habitats and associated biota that are threatened by increasing development and encroachment along coastal areas, as well as by the indirect effects of human activities. Coastal mapping efforts, such as ShoreZone, largely fulfill these needs by providing physical and biological characterizations of the shoreline. The ShoreZone imagery and maps were originally intended as an oil-spill response tool, and the data have notably been used in several emergency situations, including the grounding of the drilling barge Kulluk near Refuge Rock on Kodiak Island, Alaska, in 2012. Although most users access only the imagery, the regional-scale habitat attribute data have been used for ecological modelling and marine conservation planning. More recently the data are benefiting NOAA climate resilience studies. Recent improvements in quantifying habitat attributes allow for analytical studies such as estimating potential blue-carbon resources of seagrass and salt marshes. The imagery also has aesthetic appeal and is used for educational content, art exhibits, exploring, and books.

== Assessments ==
More than 450 ground stations were established to inform the mapping process and to evaluate the accuracy of the interpreted aerial imagery. The utility of ShoreZone maps for change detection was assessed by independent reviewers in 2010 for Cook Inlet, 2011 for Southeast Alaska, 2016 and 2018 for British Columbia. Findings include:

1. the National Oceanic and Atmospheric Administration (NOAA) digital shoreline used by ShoreZone poorly resolves features smaller than 50 meters—many small-scale features are not represented and thus cannot be accurately described;
2. ShoreZone has no explicit minimum or maximum length for a mapping unit, resulting in inconsistent placement of unit breaks among mappers or by the same mapper;
3. the combination of (1) and (2) contributes to the lack of repeatable unit breaks, leading to potential false-positive and false-negative indications of change at the scale of individual shore units; and
4. users must be aware of the limitations imposed by qualitative mapping protocols used before the 2016 revisions.
