= Argaeus =

Argaeus (Ancient Greek: Ἀργαῖος, "shining, white") can refer to:

== People ==
- Argaeus I of Macedon
- Argaeus II of Macedon

== Places ==
- Mount Erciyes, called "Argaeus" in ancient times
- Mons Argaeus, a massif on the Moon

== See also ==
- Argeus (disambiguation)
