= Argosy =

Argosy or The Argosy may refer to:

== Arts, entertainment and media ==
- Argosy (magazine), an American pulp magazine 1882–1978 and revived 1990–1994, 2004–2006
- Argosy (UK magazine), three British magazines
- Argosy spaceship in Escape Velocity (video game)
- The Argosy (newspaper), newspaper published in British Guiana 1880–1907
- Argosy (band), a British band active in 1969 which consisted of Roger Hodgson and Elton John

== Businesses and organisations ==
- Argosy Book Store, New York City, U.S.
- Argosy Films, a 1940s Australian production company
- Argosy Foundation, formerly the Abele Family Charitable Trust
- Argosy Gaming Company, a former American casino operator
- Argosy Empress Casino, a riverboat casino
- Argosy Pictures, John Ford's film company
- Argosy University, educational institutions in North America

== Transportation ==
- Armstrong Whitworth Argosy, a 1920/30s British biplane airliner
- Armstrong Whitworth AW.660 Argosy, a British post-War military transport/cargo aircraft
- Airstream Argosy, an American 1970s motorhome
- Freightliner Argosy, a truck
- SS Argosy a steamship formerly known as SS Empire Asquith
- USS Argosy (1863), a steamship

== Other uses ==
- Argosy (ship), a merchant ship or a fleet of such ships
- Argosy Glacier, in Antarctica
- Argosy Mountain, in Montana

== See also ==
- The Golden Argosy, a 1955 short story anthology
- Argonauts, a band of heroes in Greek mythology
