= October 1928 =

Month of 1928

<<	October 1928					>>
Su	Mo	Tu	We	Th	Fr	Sa
	1	2	3	4	5	6
7	8	9	10	11	12	13
14	15	16	17	18	19	20
21	22	23	24	25	26	27
28	29	30	31

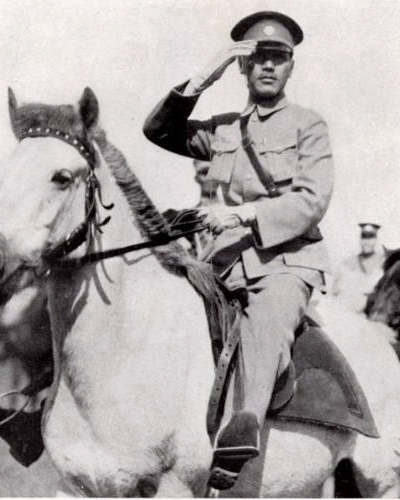
October 10, 1928: Chiang Kai-shek becomes President of the Republic of China

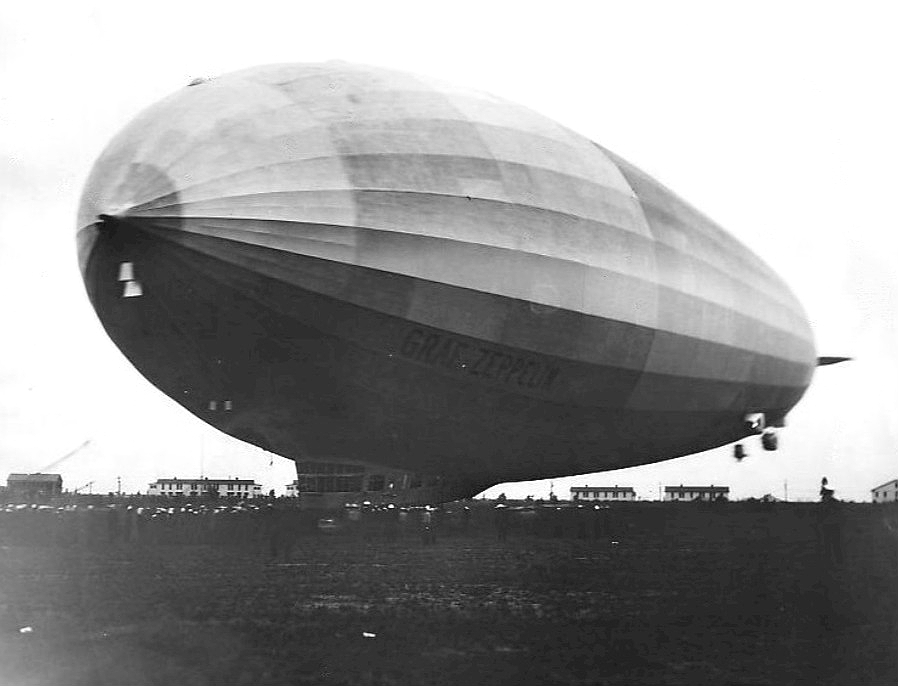
October 15, 1928: The Graf Zeppelin lands in New Jersey

The following events occurred in October 1928:

== Monday, October 1, 1928 ==
- Joseph Stalin announced the first Soviet five-year plan.
- The Mae West play Pleasure Man was closed down by police after one performance at the Biltmore Theatre on Broadway due to indecency. All 64 members of the cast were thrown in jail.
- Born: George Peppard, actor, in Detroit, Michigan (d. 1994)

== Tuesday, October 2, 1928 ==
- Arvid Lindman became Prime Minister of Sweden for the second time.
- Franklin D. Roosevelt was unanimously selected by Democratic Party leaders as a candidate for New York governor. Roosevelt initially declined consideration for the nomination due to health concerns.
- The LZ 127 Graf Zeppelin sailed across the English Channel and over parts of England during test flights as it prepared to cross the Atlantic Ocean.
- Josemaría Escrivá had a vision in which he said that he 'saw' the Opus Dei (Latin for "The Work of God"), a revelation of God's plan for Christians. Thus, the founding date of this Catholic institution is said to be October 2.
- Born: George McFarland, actor ("Spanky" in Our Gang), in Denison, Texas (d. 1993)

== Wednesday, October 3, 1928 ==
- All 43 crew on the French submarine Ondine died when the vessel sank off the coast of Portugal after a collision with a Greek ship.
- Retired boxing champion Gene Tunney and socialite Mary Lauder were married in a hotel in Rome.
- The U.S. Republican Party publicized a telegram from Charles Lindbergh to Herbert Hoover which served as an endorsement. "Your qualifications as a man and what you stand for, regardless of party, make me feel that the problems which will come before our country during the next four years will be best solved under your leadership", one line from the message read.
- Born: Edward L. Moyers, railroad executive, near Meridian, Mississippi (d. 2006)

== Thursday, October 4, 1928 ==
- German voters approved the construction of new battleships in a national referendum.
- Born: Chief Jay Strongbow, professional wrestler, in Pawhuska, Oklahoma (d. 2012)

== Friday, October 5, 1928 ==
- Australian explorer Sir Hubert Wilkins published a book entitled Undiscovered Australia, recounting an expedition to the north of the country. The book included a surprising passage in which he claimed to have seen natives of Milingimbi Island with tails.
- Died: George Beban, 54, American actor and filmmaker

== Saturday, October 6, 1928 ==
- The Goodyear company was awarded a $7,825,000 contract to build two zeppelins for the U.S. Navy.

== Sunday, October 7, 1928 ==
- The League of Nations hosted a conference on popular art in Prague.
- In fiction, H.P. Lovecraft's story "Through the Gates of the Silver Key", Randolph Carter disappears.
- Born:
  - Muriel Bevis, baseball player, in Corona, New York (d. 2002)
  - Sohrab Sepehri, Iranian poet and painter; in Kashan (d. 1980)

== Monday, October 8, 1928 ==
- Italy rejected the Anglo-French naval reduction plan, explaining that its needs were different from other nations because of the country's long coastline and many islands.
- Born: Bill Maynard, comedian and actor, in Heath End, Surrey, England (d. 2018)
- Died: Larry Semon, 39, American film actor

== Tuesday, October 9, 1928 ==
- The New York Yankees won the World Series with a 7–3 victory over the St. Louis Cardinals at Sportsman's Park, completing a four-game sweep.
- The stage musical Paris, with music and lyrics by Cole Porter, premiered on Broadway at the Music Box Theatre.
- Born: Einojuhani Rautavaara, composer, in Helsinki, Finland (d. 2016)

== Wednesday, October 10, 1928 ==
- Chiang Kai-shek became President of the Republic of China.
- King George V opened the £100,000 Tyne Bridge, containing Britain's largest steel arch.
- Born: Sheila Walsh, romance novelist, in Birmingham, England (d. 2009)

== Thursday, October 11, 1928 ==
- The LZ 127 Graf Zeppelin departed Friedrichshafen with 20 passengers and 40 crew, bound for the United States.
- Benito Mussolini told a gathering of Italian newspaper editors that they were "the freest in the world" because newspapers in other countries were "organs of plutocratic groups, parties or individuals. In some cases they are reduced to the miserable task of buying and selling exciting news and in other cases they are owned by individuals who consider the newspaper as an ordinary industry, such as the steel or leather industry."

== Friday, October 12, 1928 ==
- An iron lung was used for the first time, on a polio victim in Boston Children's Hospital.

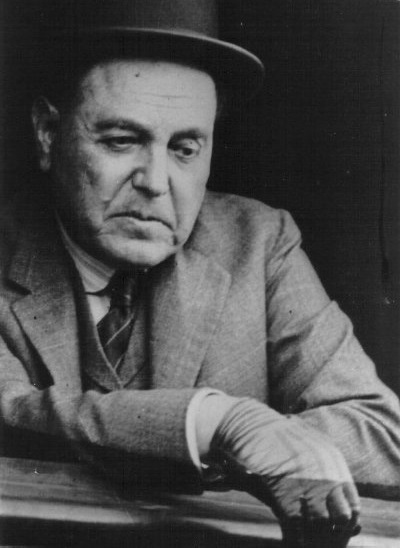
Hipolito Yrigoyen

- Hipólito Yrigoyen became President of Argentina for the second time.
- The Glasgow Queen Street rail accident killed three people in Scotland.
- Died: Augusta Emma Stetson, 86, American Christian Science leader

== Saturday, October 13, 1928 ==
- The Charfield railway disaster killed 16 people in Charfield, England.
- Ten days of mourning were declared in the United Kingdom upon the death of Dowager Empress Marie of Russia, sister of the late Queen Alexandra.
- Died: Maria Feodorovna, 80, Danish princess and former Empress of Russia

== Sunday, October 14, 1928 ==
- In the biggest radio broadcast attempted in Italy up to that time, Mussolini announced that he intended to transfer the major reconstruction efforts of Fascism from cities to undeveloped rural regions. He then distributed 1.7 million lire to Italian wheat growers.

== Monday, October 15, 1928 ==
- The LZ 127 Graf Zeppelin touched down in Lakehurst, New Jersey.
- A League of Nations-sponsored health conference on tuberculosis vaccination opened in Paris.

== Tuesday, October 16, 1928 ==
- Hugo Eckener and the crew of the Graf Zeppelin were given a ticker tape parade in New York City.
- A general strike began in Łódź, Poland in sympathy with striking textile workers.
- Died: James Walter Thompson, 80, American businessman and head of J. Walter Thompson advertising agency

== Wednesday, October 17, 1928 ==
- Polish professional unions asked the government to intervene to settle the general strike in Łódź as it began spreading to other cities.
- Born: Jim Gilliam, baseball player, in Nashville, Tennessee (d. 1978)

== Thursday, October 18, 1928 ==
- Italian communist Michele Della Maggiore was executed by firing squad for murdering two Fascists. Maggiore was the first person condemned to death in Italy since Mussolini reintroduced capital punishment.

== Friday, October 19, 1928 ==
- French Prime Minister Raymond Poincaré conferred with Seymour Parker Gilbert and Winston Churchill on the German reparations issue and made preliminary plans for a new financial conference.
- Babe Ruth endorsed Al Smith for president in a radio address.
- The general strike in Łódź began dying out.

== Saturday, October 20, 1928 ==
- Thomas Edison was awarded the Congressional Gold Medal.
- Chiang Kai-shek invited Henry Ford and four other Americans to become honorary economic advisors to China.
- Born: Li Peng, 4th Premier of the People's Republic of China, in Shanghai (d. 2019)

== Sunday, October 21, 1928 ==
- The Sunset Tunnel opened in San Francisco.
- The Romanian football club FC Ripensia Timișoara was founded.
- Born: Whitey Ford, baseball player, in New York City (d. 2020)

== Monday, October 22, 1928 ==
- Herbert Hoover gave a campaign speech before 21,000 in Madison Square Garden in New York City. Hoover reviewed the country's progress and prosperity over the past seven and a half years of Republican administrations and warned that Democratic experiments would put the economy at risk.
- Chiang Kai-shek expelled Soviet military and government advisors.
- Died:
  - Andrew Fisher, 66, three-time Prime Minister of Australia
  - Jack Dunn, 56, American baseball player and owner
  - Adolf Kraus, 78, Bohemian-born American lawyer and Jewish leader

== Tuesday, October 23, 1928 ==
- Hungary ordered four universities closed over antisemitic rioting that had been going on for several weeks ever since students accused the government of allowing more Jewish students than the law allowed.
- The stage musical Animal Crackers, starring the Marx Brothers, opened at the 44th Street Theatre on Broadway.
- RKO Pictures was founded.
- Born: Zhu Rongji, 5th Premier of the People's Republic of China, in Changsha

== Wednesday, October 24, 1928 ==
- The dramatic play Gods of the Lightning by Maxwell Anderson opened at the Little Theatre on Broadway.
- Born: Mohammad Beheshti, scholar, writer and Chief Justice of Iran, in Isfahan (d. 1981)
- Died: Arthur Bowen Davies, 66, American artist

== Thursday, October 25, 1928 ==
- The Daily Express revealed that a Macedonian plot to assassinate King Alexander of Yugoslavia had been uncovered in Belgrade.
- Born:
  - Jeanne Cooper, actress, in Taft, California (d. 2013)
  - Marion Ross, actress, in Watertown, Minnesota

== Friday, October 26, 1928 ==
- A deal was reached between General Electric and the Amtorg Trading Corporation to compensate G.E. for factories seized in Russia after the Revolution.
- During a meeting in the Royal Albert Hall, Prime Minister Stanley Baldwin said that Britain had no intention of building up its navy in competition with the United States.
- Died: Rodryg Dunin, 58, Polish noble, industrialist and agriculturalist

== Saturday, October 27, 1928 ==
- Fascist Italy celebrated the sixth anniversary of the March on Rome with a ceremonial burning of 140 million lire worth of government bonds, donated by citizens for the purpose of reducing the national debt. Each person who turned in a bond had their name written in a "golden book".
- The CBS radio Saturday morning children's show Let's Pretend first aired.

== Sunday, October 28, 1928 ==
- The first of 2,802 public utility works, including a new highway from Rome to the coast near Ostia, were inaugurated around Italy as part of national commemoration of the Fascist revolution. Celebrations were unostentatious under order from Mussolini as a lesson in economy.
- Fox Film Corporation opened Movietone City, a new $10 million movie studio complex.
- The Second Youth Congress was held in Batavia, Dutch East Indies by the young Indonesian nationalists, resulting in a declaration that is called the Youth Pledge. The Indonesian national anthem, "Indonesia Raya", was introduced at the congress.

== Monday, October 29, 1928 ==
- The Graf Zeppelin departed Lakehurst, New Jersey, and headed back over the Atlantic.
- Most of Venice was flooded two feet deep after a gale.
- The B.F. Keith Memorial Theatre opened in Boston.

== Tuesday, October 30, 1928 ==
- The first pictures ever publicly broadcast in Britain through the fultograph system were transmitted by the BBC to the Savoy Hotel in London. A picture of George V and a cartoon were successfully transmitted.
- Born:
  - Bobby Jones, jazz saxophonist, in Louisville, Kentucky (d. 1980)
  - Daniel Nathans, microbiologist, in Wilmington, Delaware (d. 1999)
- Died: Robert Lansing, 64, American lawyer and politician

== Wednesday, October 31, 1928 ==
- The surprise retirement of Alanson B. Houghton as United States Ambassador to the United Kingdom was announced.
- Los Angeles County district attorney Asa Keyes was indicted on a charge of corruption.
- The Frank Capra-directed silent film The Power of the Press, starring Douglas Fairbanks, Jr. and Jobyna Ralston, was released.
- Died: John William Wood, Sr., 72, American politician and co-founder of the town of Benson, North Carolina
