= November 1928 =

Month of 1928

<<	November 1928					>>
Su	Mo	Tu	We	Th	Fr	Sa
				1	2	3
4	5	6	7	8	9	10
11	12	13	14	15	16	17
18	19	20	21	22	23	24
25	26	27	28	29	30

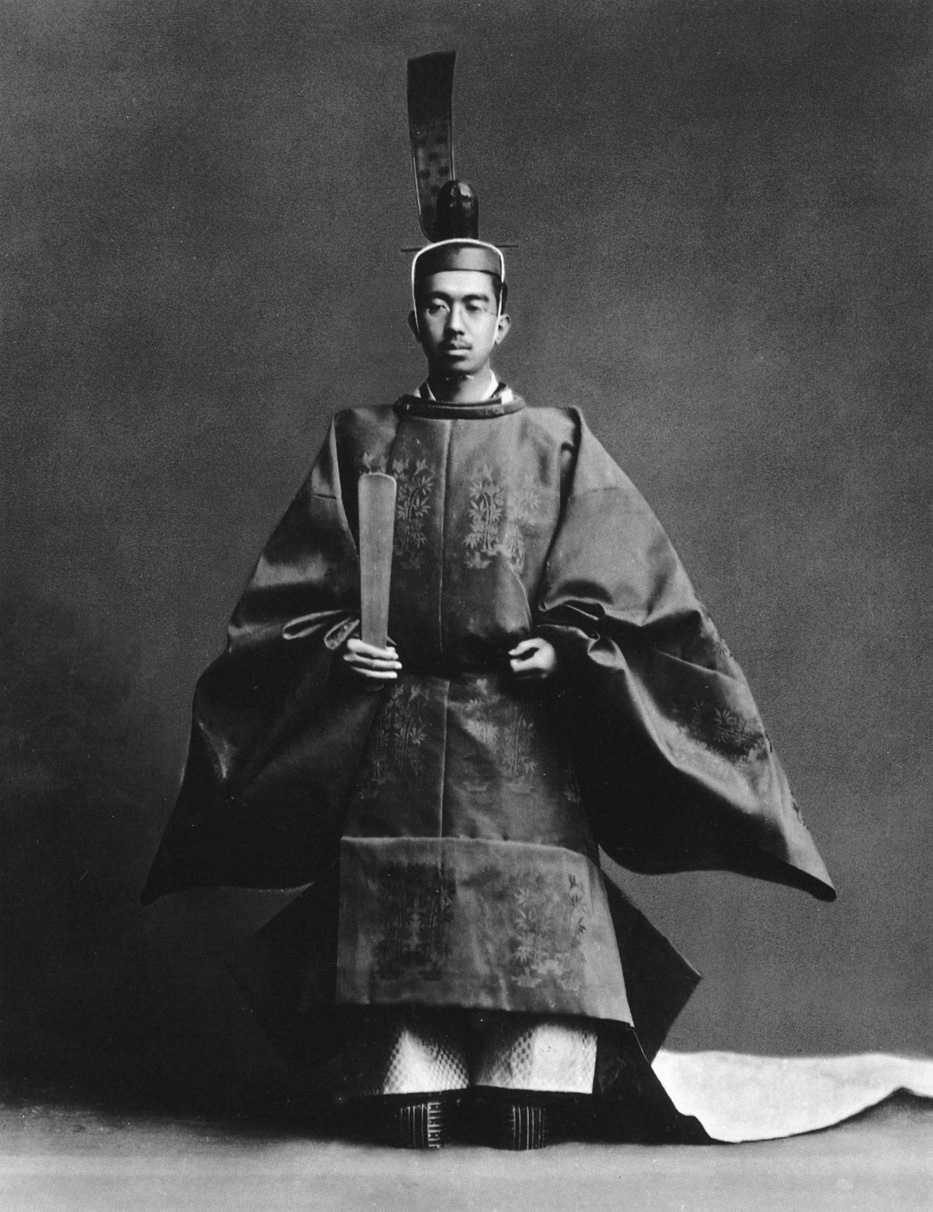
November 10, 1928: Hirohito of Japan formally enshrined as the Showa Emperor

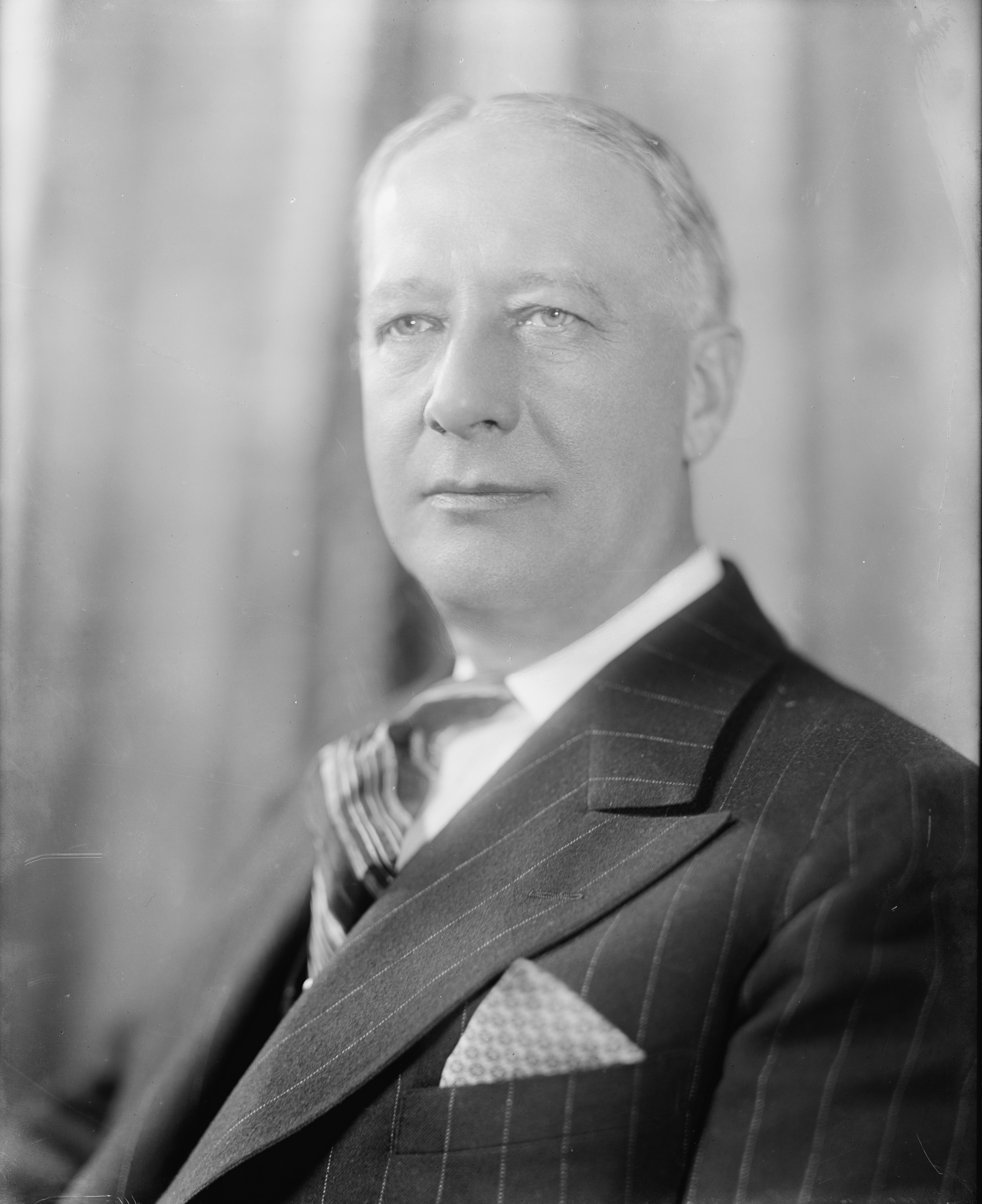
November 6, 1928: Herbert Hoover defeats Alfred Smith to win U.S. presidential election

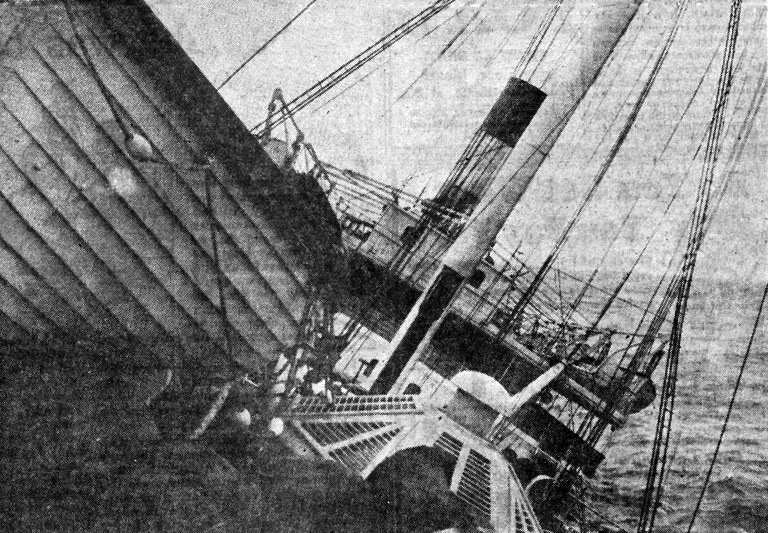
November 13, 1928: Capsizing of SS Vetris Kills 124 people

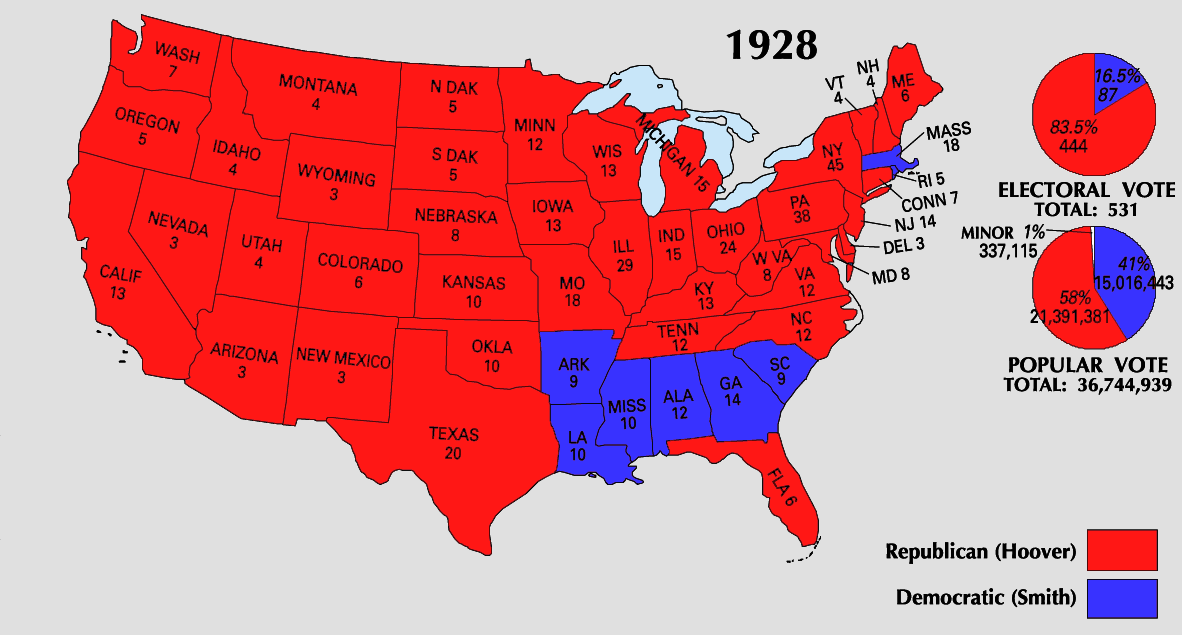
Hoover carried 41 of the 48 states, including Governor Smith's New York, and got 444 of the 531 electoral votes

The following events occurred in November 1928:

== Thursday, November 1, 1928 ==
- Turkey passed a law switching the country from the Arabic to the Latin-based modern Turkish alphabet.
- Cuba held a presidential election; incumbent President Gerardo Machado was re-elected.
- The LZ 127 Graf Zeppelin landed back in Friedrichshafen only 71 hours and 12 minutes after leaving the United States, a new Atlantic crossing speed record for dirigibles.
- The Romanian Radio Broadcasting Company was launched.

== Friday, November 2, 1928 ==
- The trial of José de León Toral, the assassin of Mexican president-elect Álvaro Obregón, opened in San Ángel. Toral, a Roman Catholic, testified that he felt he could "save the church from its enemies and herself, by ridding the country of the intellectual head of this terrible state of affairs."
- After months of earthquakes and collapses of Mount Etna's central crater, a lateral fault located halfway up the northeast slope of the volcano ripped open. Over the course of the next three weeks, roads and a portion of the Circumetnea train track were covered in molten rock, nearly two-thousand acres of historic vineyards and agricultural space were destroyed, and the village of Mascali was buried.

== Saturday, November 3, 1928 ==
- Al Smith wrapped up his presidential campaign with a speech before 23,000 in Madison Square Garden in New York City. Smith pledged to clean up political corruption and modify the Eighteenth Amendment to make it a states' rights issue.
- Born:
  - Nick Holonyak, American inventor of LED, in Zeigler, Illinois (d. 2022)
  - Osamu Tezuka, Japanese manga artist, in Toyonaka, Osaka (d. 1989)

== Sunday, November 4, 1928 ==
- The Nicaraguan general election was held; José María Moncada was elected president.
- New York underworld figure Arnold Rothstein was shot in the stomach by unknown assailants at the Park Central Hotel. He was rushed to hospital clinging to life.
- The comedy-drama film The Haunted House was released. The film had no dialogue, but did feature a synchronized Vitaphone soundtrack with music and sound effects.
- Born: George Yardley, basketball player, in Hollywood, California (d. 2004)

== Monday, November 5, 1928 ==
- Herbert Hoover and Al Smith made their final appeals to American voters with national radio addresses.

== Tuesday, November 6, 1928 ==
- Herbert Hoover of the Republican Party was elected President of the United States with a decisive victory, winning 444 electoral votes to Al Smith's 87. Hoover even carried Smith's home state of New York.
- Franklin D. Roosevelt was elected Governor of New York.
- Born: Peter Matz, musician, composer, arranger and conductor, in Pittsburgh (d. 2002)
- Died: Arnold Rothstein, 46, Jewish-American racketeer, businessman and gambler, died in a New York City hospital, of wounds from being shot two days earlier, at 10:20 in the morning.

== Wednesday, November 7, 1928 ==
- The Sicilian town of Mascali was almost completely destroyed by lava from Mount Etna.
- Lord Cushendun told the House of Lords that the Anglo-French naval reduction pact had been abandoned.
- The Boston Braves and Chicago Cubs turned a major deal. The Cubs received Rogers Hornsby in exchange for Bruce Cunningham, Percy Jones, Lou Legett, Freddie Maguire, Socks Seibold and $200,000.

== Thursday, November 8, 1928 ==
- José de León Toral was sentenced to death by firing squad. A nun was sentenced to twenty years imprisonment for being the "intellectual author" of the assassination.
- The Preble Box Toe Company explosion in Lynn, Massachusetts killed 20 people.

== Friday, November 9, 1928 ==
- U.S. President Calvin Coolidge announced that president-elect Herbert Hoover would undertake a goodwill tour of South America before entering office.
- Born: Anne Sexton, poet, in Newton, Massachusetts (d. 1974)

== Saturday, November 10, 1928 ==
- The enthronement ceremony of Emperor of Japan Hirohito was held in Kyoto, almost two years after he actually took the throne upon the death of Emperor Yoshihito.
- Iuliu Maniu became Prime Minister of Romania.
- The adventure romance film White Shadows in the South Seas was released. The film had no dialogue (other than a single instance of the word "hello") but it had a pre-recorded soundtrack with music and sound effects. The MGM lion roar was first heard at the beginning of this film.
- Born: Ennio Morricone, Italian composer, in Rome (d. 2020)

== Sunday, November 11, 1928 ==
- A massive "moving day" of radio station frequencies took place in the United States due to General Order 40. Listeners around the country had to readjust their dials to find their favorite stations, but they also found programming they had never before been able to receive.
- Born: Carlos Fuentes, writer, in Panama City (d. 2012)
- Died: Oyster Burns, 64, American baseball player

== Monday, November 12, 1928 ==
- The British steamship SS Vestris sent out an SOS when it began to sink off the coast of Virginia after listing in a storm. Passengers and crew took to the lifeboats for fear that the ship would sink entirely and carry them to the bottom.
- Died: Oskar Victorovich Stark, 82, Russian admiral and explorer

== Tuesday, November 13, 1928 ==
- Rescuers saved 215 of the 339 known passengers and crew of the SS Vestris. One was found dead, and the other 123 remained unaccounted for.
- Died: Enrico Cecchetti, 78, Italian ballet dancer and mime

== Wednesday, November 14, 1928 ==
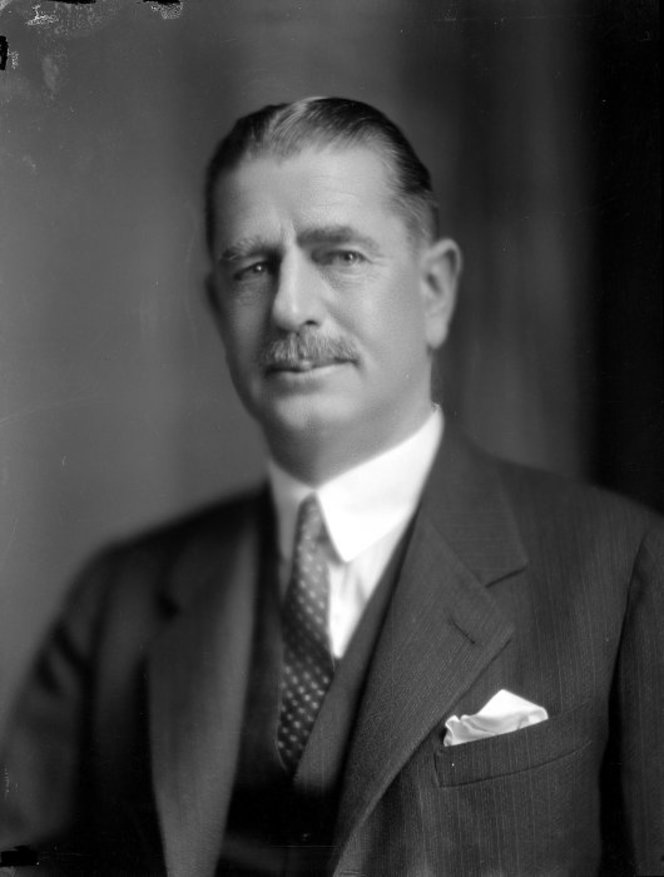
Prime Minister Coates defeated

- In Afghanistan, the Shinwari tribe revolted and besieged Jalalabad, marking the start of the Afghan Civil War (1928–1929).
- The Elections were held in New Zealand for the 80-seat unicameral New Zealand Parliament. The United Party, led by Joseph Ward, gained 16 seats and control of Parliament, while the Reform Party of Prime Minister Gordon Coates lost 28 of its 55 seats.
- With the death toll in the SS Vestris disaster fixed at between 108 and 115, the ship's staff was widely criticized by survivors. They accused the captain of sending the SOS message too late and claimed that many of the lifeboats were in bad condition and lacked sufficient flares to signal rescue ships. Many women and children perished when the first lifeboat foundered.

== Thursday, November 15, 1928 ==
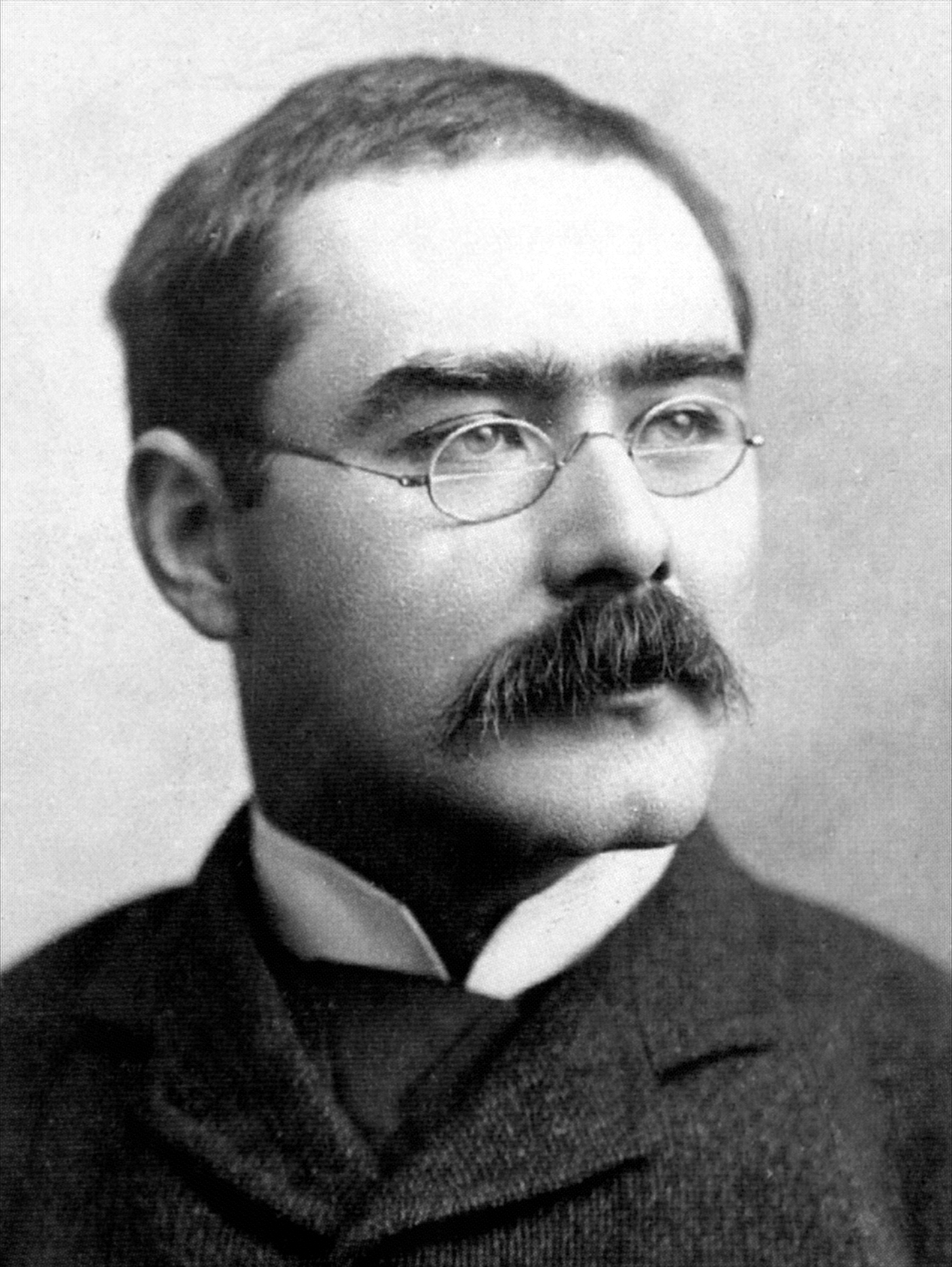
Kipling

- Rudyard Kipling declared a copyright on his speeches, handing out advance copies of a speech he was about to make to the Royal Society of Medicine with a notice stating that all rights to the speech would revert to him on Sunday. "I have never heard of it being done before", said newspaper proprietor Lord Riddell. "What Mr. Kipling apparently is trying to do is to give a license to newspapers for the reproduction of his speech for forty-eight hours after it is delivered. What legal force the condition has I do not know. I do not believe such a demand ever has been tested."
- The British lifeboat RNLB Mary Stanford capsized and sank in Rye Harbour, drowning the entire 17-man crew.
- Born: Gus Bell, baseball player, in Louisville, Kentucky (d. 1995)

== Friday, November 16, 1928 ==
- In a record day of trading on Wall Street, 6.6 million shares were bought and sold.
- Born: Dick Gamble, Canadian ice hockey player, in Moncton, New Brunswick (d. 2018)

== Saturday, November 17, 1928 ==
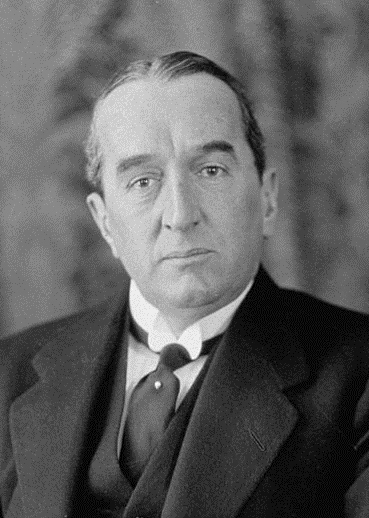
Australia's Prime Minister Bruce

- Federal elections were held in Australia for the 36 seats of the Australian Senate and the 75 seats of the House of Representatives. "The Coalition" (legislators of the Liberal Party and of the Country Party, led by Prime Minister Stanley Bruce), maintained control of the House and the Senate. Australian voters also carried a referendum amending the constitution concerning financial relations between the federal and state governments.
- Boston Madison Square Garden, later shortened to Boston Garden, officially opened with a boxing card. Featherweight champion André Routis lost a non-title match to Dick Finnegan.
- Notre Dame lost a football game on home field for the first time in 23 years when Carnegie-Mellon beat them, 27–7.
- Born:
  - Arman, French-born American artist, in Nice (d. 2005)
  - Rance Howard, actor, in Duncan, Oklahoma (d. 2017)
  - Anna Meyer, baseball player, in Aurora, Indiana
- Died: Lala Lajpat Rai, 63, Indian Punjabi author and politician

== Sunday, November 18, 1928 ==

- The Walt Disney animated short Steamboat Willie, officially introducing Mickey Mouse, premiered at Universal's Colony Theatre in New York City.
- President-elect Herbert Hoover boarded the battleship USS Maryland at Palo Alto, California, with his wife Lou and youngest son Allan to begin a two-month goodwill tour of Latin America.
- Born:
  - Otar Gordeli, Georgian composer, in Tbilisi, Georgian SSR (d. 1994)
  - Rudy Migay, ice hockey player and coach, in Fort William, Ontario, Canada (d. 2016)
- Died: Mauritz Stiller, 45, Finnish-Swedish film director

== Monday, November 19, 1928 ==
- The United States Supreme Court upheld the validity of a law in New York State directed against the Ku Klux Klan, which required organizations other than labor unions or benevolent orders to file paperwork that included a roster of its members.
- Born: Ina van Faassen, Dutch actress and comedian, in Amsterdam (d. 2011)

== Tuesday, November 20, 1928 ==
- An ammunition factory exploded outside Paris, killing 12 people.
- Born: Franklin Cover, American TV and film actor best known for The Jeffersons, in Cleveland (d. 2006)

== Wednesday, November 21, 1928 ==
- King George V became seriously ill with sepsis.
- The secret engagement of John Barrymore and Dolores Costello was revealed to the public.

== Thursday, November 22, 1928 ==
- The orchestral piece Boléro by Maurice Ravel was first publicly performed at the Paris Opéra.
- Queen Mary performed an official function without her husband for the first time, inaugurating the restored Hall of London's Inn.
- Born:
  - Timothy Beaumont, Baron Beaumont of Whitley, in England (d. 2008)
  - Pat Smythe, showjumper and author, in Britain (d. 1996)
  - Sandy Keith, American jurist and politician from Minnesota (d. 2020)

== Friday, November 23, 1928 ==
- The New York Stock Exchange had to shut down for a day to process a backlog of 6.9 million transactions.
- The Colombia Stock Exchange was founded.
- Born: Gene Kiniski, Canadian professional wrestler, in Edmonton (d. 2010)

== Saturday, November 24, 1928 ==
- John Barrymore and Dolores Costello were married at Costello's home in Beverly Hills, California.
- China announced a joint Chinese–German operation to develop air service between Nanjing and Berlin.

== Sunday, November 25, 1928 ==
- Twenty people were reported dead in storms that sank shipping in the Atlantic and Mediterranean. The French vessel Le Cesare went down off the coast of Algiers.
- Leon Trotsky's secretary died after going on a hunger strike in protest at the alleged torture of Trotskyists.

== Monday, November 26, 1928 ==
- President-elect Herbert Hoover visited Honduras and El Salvador in the first stops of his Latin American goodwill tour.
- The Philip Barry play Holiday opened at the Plymouth Theatre on Broadway.
- Died: Reinhard Scheer, 65, German admiral

== Tuesday, November 27, 1928 ==
- Edward, Prince of Wales cut short his African trip to head home to the King's bedside.
- At least 100 were reported dead in the western European storms of the past four days.
- Herbert Hoover visited Nicaragua.

== Wednesday, November 28, 1928 ==
- Herbert Hoover visited Costa Rica.
- Born: Piet Steenbergen, footballer, in Rotterdam, Netherlands (d. 2010)

== Thursday, November 29, 1928 ==
- The Italian government announced changes to the country's labour system, practically dissolving the syndicalist hierarchy and giving more self-autonomy to each of the six federations organized by the categories of workers.
- Born: Paul Simon, U.S. Senator for Illinois; in Eugene, Oregon (d. 2003)

== Friday, November 30, 1928 ==
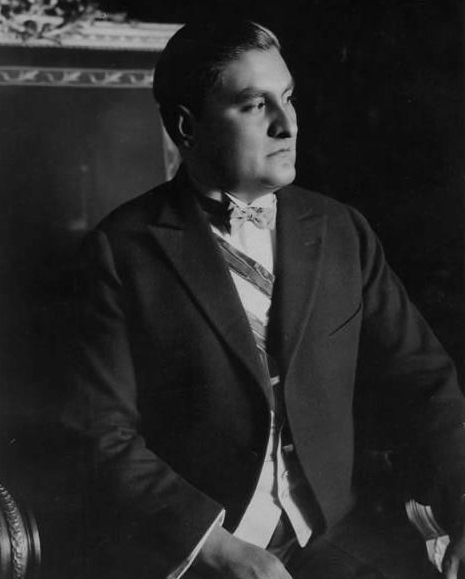
Mexico's President Emilio Portes

- Emilio Portes Gil was sworn in as 41st President of Mexico.
- The French Chamber of Deputies passed a military budget bill providing for the French Army to be the largest in the world.
- Born:
  - Takako Doi, politician, in Kobe, Japan (d. 2014)
  - Joe B. Hall, basketball coach, in Cynthiana, Kentucky (d. 2022)
  - Peter Hans Kolvenbach, Dutch Superior General of the Society of Jesus (d. 2016)
  - Elmira Nazirova, Azerbaijani composer (d. 2014)
