= Argo Investments =

Australian public company

Argo Investments Limited
- Company type: Public
- Traded as: ASX: ARG
- Industry: Diversified investments
- Founded: 1946
- Headquarters: Adelaide, Australia
- Key people: Jason Beddow (MD); Tim Binks (COO); Andrew Hill (CFO); Andy Forster (SIO)
- Operating income: $174 million (2021)
- Website: argoinvestments.com.au

Argo Investments Limited is an Australian listed investment company (LIC), which trades its shares on the Australian Stock Exchange (ASX). Its diversified portfolio of shares are selected for profitability and long-term growth prospects at cost-effective prices. As of 2007, it is the second largest LIC in Australia.

Argo invests predominantly in shares of other companies listed on the ASX.

== Establishment and history ==
Argo Investments Limited was established in Adelaide, South Australia in 1946 by Kevin Ward QC, solicitor, and Alf Adamson, a chartered accountant who had previously worked on company valuations. Donald Bradman was chairman of the company from 1982 to 1984.

In 1990, Argo acquired investment company Schroder Dual Fund, and in 1992 it acquired Stoddarts Holdings. Argo was involved in the establishment of other LICs, including Bounty Investments Ltd and Wakefield Investments Ltd, both of which Argo maintained an investment in. In 2001, Argo merged with both Bounty and Wakefield, after making successful takeover offers for both, on the basis of offering Argo shares in exchange for shares in the companies being acquired. These terms of acquisition allowed Bounty and Wakefield shareholders to be relieved from liability to pay capital gains tax on the disposal of their shares.

The top 20 investments and Net Tangible Asset backing per share (NTA) are published regularly in the Monthly NTA newsletters.

== Investment philosophy ==
Argo has maintained a conservative investment philosophy, holding a diversified portfolio of investments in many Australian listed public companies. It has historically paid regular semi-annual dividends to shareholders, with the 2017 full year dividend being 31 cents per share.

== Argo Global Listed Infrastructure (AGLI) ==
For the purpose of managing a portfolio of foreign company shares, Argo launched AGLI as a separate company and listed it on the ASX (code ALI) on 3 July 2015. The advantage to shareholders is a single "paper trail" of income from foreign sources. AGLI is managed by ASCO, a wholly owned subsidiary of Argo.
