= Argos (Nisyros) =

Coordinates: 36°34′26″N 27°09′21″E

Argos (Ancient Greek: Ἄργος) was a small town of ancient Greece in the southwest of the island of Nisyros.

Its site is located near modern Stavros.
