= Argus (monitoring software) =

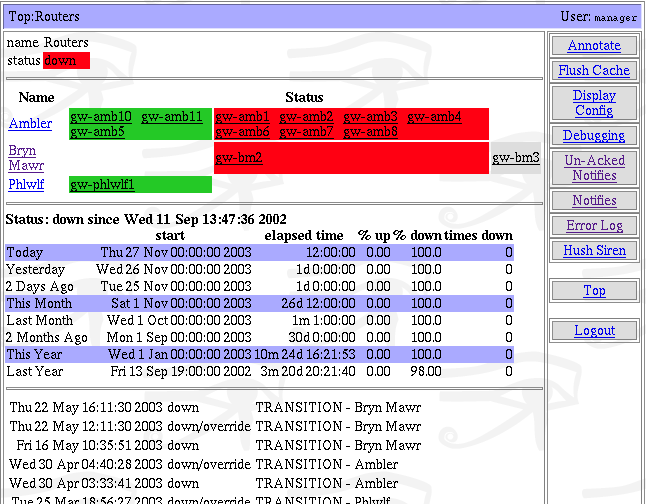
- Stable release: 3.7 / Feb. 2013
- Written in: Perl / Go
- Operating system: Any Unix-like
- Type: Network management system
- License: Artistic License 1.0
- Website: http://argus.tcp4me.com/

Argus is a systems and network monitoring application. It is designed to monitor the status of network services, servers, and other network hardware. It will send alerts when it detects problems.

It is open-source software originally written entirely in Perl, but nowadays in Go, and provides a web based interface.

== Overview ==
- Can monitor most network services.
- Supports both IPv4 and IPv6
- Includes graphing.
- Web based front end.
- Can monitor tens-of-thousands of services on common PC hardware.
- Supports distributed and redundant configurations.
- Configured using simple text files.

== Details ==
- Monitoring of network services (SMTP, POP3, HTTP, NNTP, ICMP, SNMP, FTP, Telnet, SSH, Gopher, NFS, DNS, RADIUS, IAX2, SIP, SunRPC, Whois, Rwhois, LPD, NTP)
- Monitoring of server resources: system load, network load, and disk usage, using an agent.
- Monitoring of the results of any command or script.
- Monitoring is easily extendable through user-written scripts.

== See also ==
- Comparison of network monitoring systems
