= Argo, Georgia =

Ghost town in the USA

Coordinates: 34°41′28″N 84°08′29″W

Argo is a ghost town in Fannin County, in the U.S. state of Georgia.

== History ==
Prior to European colonization, the area that is now Argo was inhabited by the Cherokee people and other Indigenous peoples for thousands of years.

A post office called Argo was established in 1900, and remained in operation until 1908. In 1900, the community had 42 inhabitants.
