= HMS Argo =

Five ships of the Royal Navy have borne the name HMS Argo, after the Argo, the ship of Jason and the Argonauts:

- HMS Argo (1758) was a 28-gun sixth rate frigate launched in 1758 and broken up by 1776.
- HMS Argo (1780) was a schooner purchased in 1780 and sold in 1783.
- HMS Argo (1781) was a 44-gun fifth rate launched in 1781. In 1783, she was captured by two French frigates, but was recaptured two days later by HMS Invincible. She was sold in 1816.
- HMS Argo (1833) was a 38-gun fifth rate, launched in 1799 as HMS Active. She was converted to harbour service in 1826, was renamed HMS Argo in 1833 and was broken up in 1860.
- HMS Argo was a composite screw sloop launched in 1880 as HMS Espiegle. She was used as a boom defence vessel from 1899 and was renamed HMS Argo in 1904. She was sold in 1921.
