= Argus (TV series) =

- Genre: Debate
- Country of origin: Norway
- Original language: Norwegian

Original release
- Network: TV3
- Release: 1993 – 1994

Argus was a Norwegian debate show hosted by Mona Høiness, that aired on TV3.

In the summer of 1993 Høiness threatened to quit her job as a host in protest of TV3 airing the show Bikini, an American show featuring scantily-clad women on a podium surrounded by cheering men. Høiness didn't want that kind of entertainment on a channel with which she was associated. Shortly after TV3 decided to cancel Bikini.
