= Agros =

Agros may refer to:

- Agros, Cyprus, a village in the Troodos Mountains, Cyprus
- Agros, Greece, a village in the island of Corfu, Greece
