= Argo (name) =

Male given name and family name

Argo is a masculine given name and a surname which may refer to:

- Allison Argo (born 1953), American film producer, director, writer, editor and narrator
- Arthur Argo (1935–1981), Scottish folk musician, playwright and poet
- Bob Argo (1923–2016), American politician
- Edwin Argo (1895–1962), American horse rider
- Mary Langs Argo (died 1984), American physicist
- Victor Argo (1934–2004), American actor
- Argo Aadli (born 1980), Estonian actor
- Argo Arbeiter (born 1973), Estonian football manager and former player
- Argo Golberg (born 1982), Estonian runner at the 2003 IAAF World Indoor Championships – Men's 60 metres
- Argo Meresaar (born 1980), Estonian retired volleyball player
