= Argeus =

Argeus (Ancient Greek: Ἀργεύς, "the hunter") can refer to:

== People ==
- Argeus (mythology), several figures in Greek mythology, including:
  - Argeus of Argos, a mythological king of Argos
- Argeus (pretender), a pretender to the throne of ancient Macedonia
- Argeus, Roman Catholic saint, one of Narcissus, Argeus, and Marcellinus

== Places ==
- Mount Erciyes, Kayseri, Turkey, known to the Romans as Argeus

== See also ==
- Agreus, one of the Panes
- Argaeus (disambiguation)
