= Argo Hotel =

- U.S. National Register of Historic Places
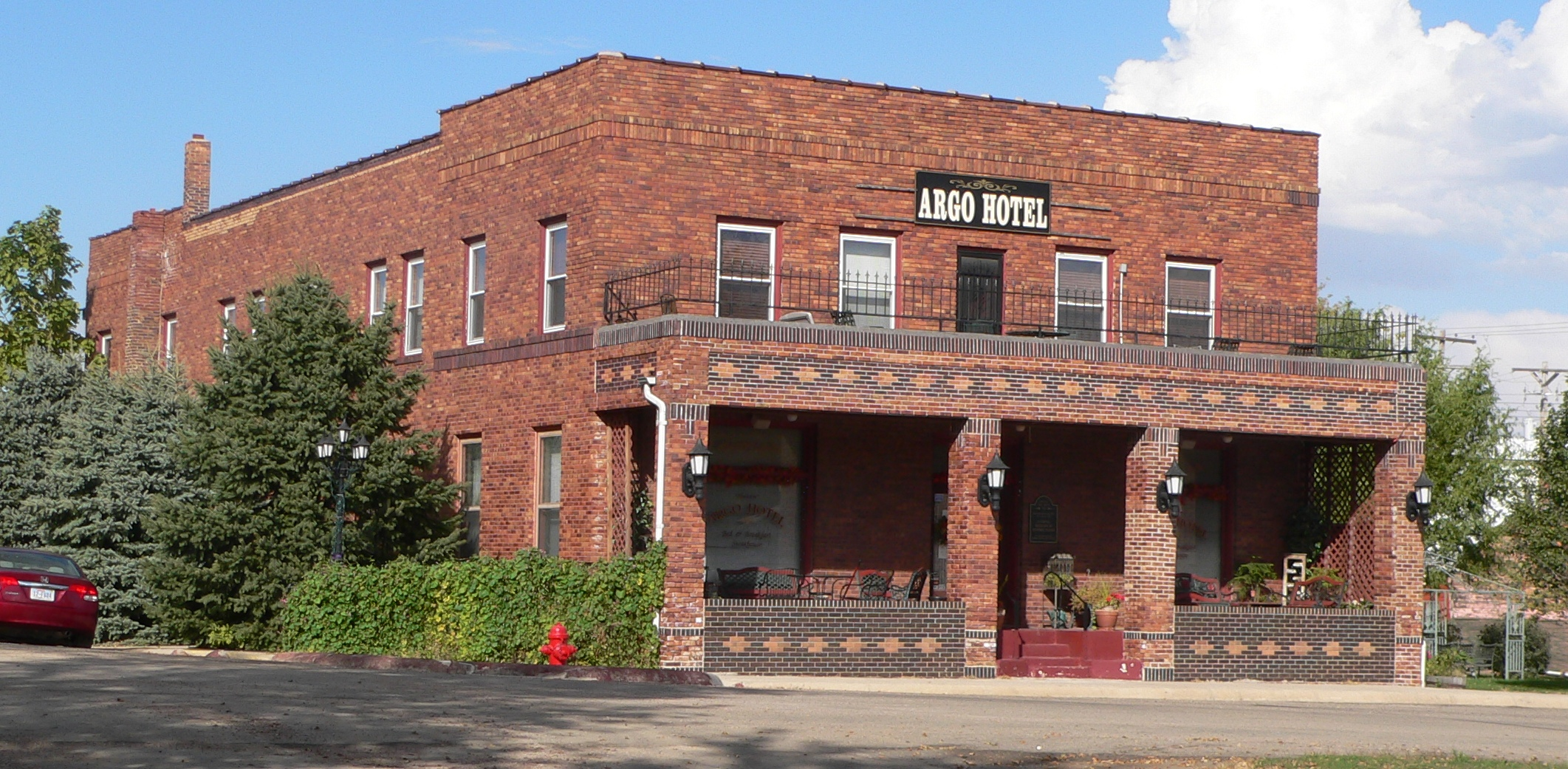

- Location within Nebraska Location within the United States
- Location: 211 Kansas St., Crofton, Nebraska
- Coordinates: 42°43′54″N 97°29′49″W
- Area: less than one acre
- Built: 1912; 1940
- Architectural style: Early Commercial
- NRHP reference No.: 99000478
- Added to NRHP: May 5, 1999

The Argo Hotel in Nebraska is a historic hotel listed on the U.S. National Register of Historic Places. Also or previously known as The New Meridian Hotel and as The New Meridian Sanatorium, it is Nebraska historic site NeHBS #KX05-015. It was built as a hotel in 1912 and was converted to a health clinic in 1940.

Its interior features a tin ceiling on the first floor, and transom windows over the guest room doors.
