= Argo (2006 film) =

- Directed by: Jordan Bayne; Michael Knowles
- Written by: Jordan Bayne; Michael Knowles
- Produced by: Laura Knight; Michael Knowles; John Ramos; Cody Bayne; Jordan Bayne; Matthew Bayne; Susan Bayne; Canon Price
- Starring: Jordana Spiro; Marcus Chait
- Cinematography: Michael Knowles
- Edited by: Michael Knowles
- Production companies: Blue Eyed Cherokee Films; 7A Productions
- Release date: August 13, 2006
- Running time: 23 minutes
- Country: United States
- Language: English

Argo is a 2006 short romance drama film that marks Jordan Bayne's short film writing and directorial debut. Co-written and co-directed by Bayne and Michael Knowles, the film was shot on location in Joshua Tree, California, in 2005.

== Synopsis ==
According to the production company's official synopsis, Argo tells the story of two individuals living outside society in the American desert. It explores the struggles of being human in a world that seemed bent on crushing the human spirit. Becca (played by Jordana Spiro) is a dispossessed soul whose chance encounter with Cal (played by Marcus Chait) becomes a collision course that changes their lives. The film shows that loneliness and desperation can create an unconscious longing for human connection and that hope can be found in the most unexpected places.

== Awards and nominations ==
Argo has received recognition while on the festival circuit, screening in 2006 at the Napa Sonoma Wine Country Film Festival, Tacoma Film Festival, the Independent Film Festival of North Texas, and in 2007 at the Sunscreen Film festival, Westchester Film Festival, FilmFest ReLoaded, Pumelo Independent Film Festival, Miami Underground Film Festival, Delray Beach Film Festival, Sedona Film Festival, NewFilmMakers Winter Series, Soho House Screening Series, and the DeREEL Independent Film Festival.

2006 Independent Film Festival of North Texas

- Won Best Director (Jordan Bayne)
- Won Best Short Film
- Nominated Best Screenplay

2006 Tacoma Film Festival

- Won Best Short In Town

2006 Pumelo Film Festival

- Nominated Best Short Film
