= ARGOS DSS =

ARGOS is a Decision Support System (DSS) for crisis and emergency management for incidents with chemical, biological, radiological, and nuclear (CBRN) releases.

== System ==
In case of incidents with chemical, biological, radiological or nuclear releases, ARGOS can be used to get an overview of the situation, create a prognosis of how the situation will evolve, and calculate the consequences of the incidents. The target is accidents, as well as terrorist initiated events related to CBRN industries, transports of hazardous materials, and others.

ARGOS improves situation awareness, facilitates decision support, and information sharing among the emergency response organizations. As a simulation instrument, ARGOS is also valuable for training of response organizations, and for providing information to the public.

The ARGOS system makes intensive use of geographic information system (GIS) to display data on geographic maps. Colours are used to express the concentration, contamination, time-of-arrival, trajectories, doses or inhalation, and ISO curves can display important threshold levels. The GIS system can display NPP’s – measuring stations and weather conditions like precipitation and wind fields.

For running short range prognoses, ARGOS can download a numerical weather prediction from the Met-Office in the country. As the main atmospheric dispersion model, ARGOS includes the RIMPUFF model from Risø National Laboratory.

== User Group ==
The current member countries of the ARGOS User Group are (January 2017): Australia, Brazil, Canada, Denmark, Estonia, Germany, Ireland, Japan, Latvia, Lithuania, Norway, Poland, Singapore, Sweden, Ukraine and United Kingdom.

The ARGOS User Group has the objective of maintaining and further evolve ARGOS as a state-of-the-art decision support system for emergency response, as well as a network of expertise. The ARGOS User Group arranges bi-annual meetings where all members have equal opportunities to influence the development of the system. The ARGOS User Group discusses experiences with ARGOS and decides which new facilities to develop, which new models to include, among others.

== History ==
The original development of ARGOS started in 1992 by the Danish Emergency Management Agency and Prolog Development Center, in close cooperation with Risø National Laboratory and the Danish Meteorological Institute.
