= Arjas =

Arjas ارجاس
- Village
- Location within Iran
- Coordinates: 30°25′34″N 56°31′52″E
- Country: Iran
- Province: Kerman
- County: Rafsanjan
- Bakhsh: Central
- Rural District: Khenaman

Population (2006)
  - Total: 50
- Time zone: UTC+3:30 (IRST)
  - Summer (DST): UTC+4:30 (IRDT)

Arjas (Persian: ارجاس, also Romanized as Arjās; also known as Argus, Arjāsb, and Ugāsin) is a village in Khenaman Rural District, in the Central District of Rafsanjan County, Kerman Province, Iran.

== Population ==
At the 2006 census, its population was 50, in 22 families.
