= Task Force Argo =

US non-profit for Afghan refugees

Task Force Argo is a U.S. task force consisting of a volunteer group of American veterans and citizens to evacuate U.S. citizens and families as well as Afghan allies and their families, following Fall of Kabul. As of January 19, 2022, the group has evacuated 2,216 refugees.

== History ==
Task Force Argo was founded by Jesse Jensen on August 16, 2021. This effort culminated into volunteers using Signal and WhatsApp to gather intelligence on the ground and coordinate pick ups and extraction efforts for individuals having trouble accessing the gates due to large crowds and Taliban checkpoints.

Task Force Argo was able to get over 300 people out before the U.S. forces departed Kabul International Airport. After the departure Argo adjusted to a new charter flight strategy and partnered with several Task Force Pineapple officials to charter flights out of the country for evacuees. As of January 2021, Task Force Argo has successfully evacuated 2,216 people from Afghanistan.

== Leadership ==
Task Force Argo leadership is publicly represented by its founders, Iowa State Senator Zach Nunn, former JSOC Ground Force Commander (2nd Ranger Battalion) Jesse Jensen, and Munjeet Singh, an executive in a defense industrial base.

Task Force Argo is fiscally sponsored by Special Operations Association of America.

Argo’s roster of volunteers consists of United States Department of Defense personnel, active duty service members and veterans, current and former United States Intelligence Community and law enforcement Officers, elected officials, former special operators, intelligence analysts, military aviators, diplomats, defense industry executives, and other subject matter experts.

The volunteers continue to support Afghans by helping coordinate with Department of State initiatives, finding alternate routes, organizing medical efforts and navigating through immigration processes.
