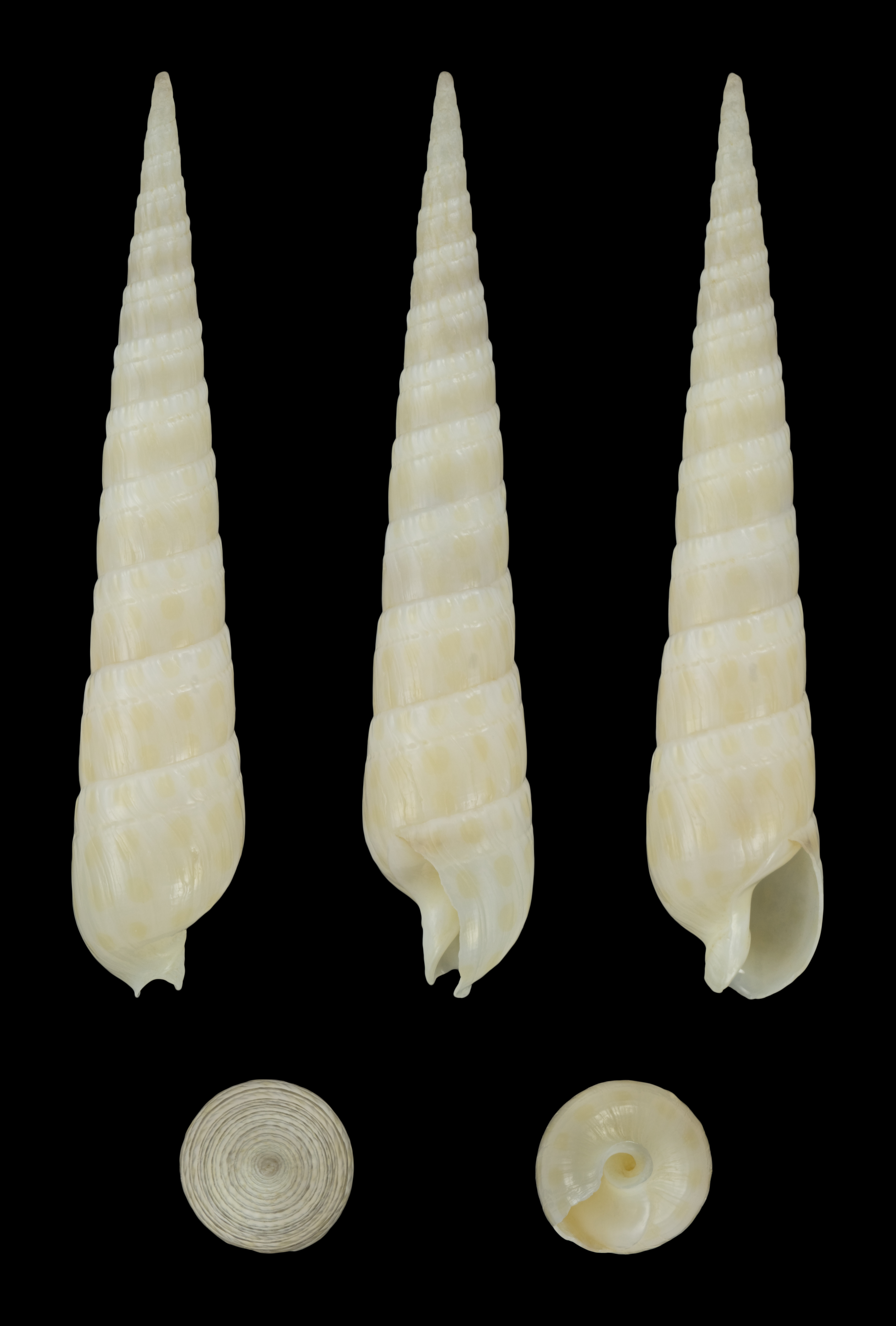

Scientific classification
- Kingdom: Animalia
- Phylum: Mollusca
- Class: Gastropoda
- Subclass: Caenogastropoda
- Order: Neogastropoda
- Family: Terebridae
- Genus: Terebra
- Species: T. argus

Binomial name
- Terebra argus Hinds, 1844

Synonyms
- Subula argus Hinds, 1844; Terebra argus argus Hinds, 1844; Terebra argus brachygyra Pilsbry, 1921; Terebra nebulosa Kiener, 1839

= Terebra argus =

Species of gastropod

Terebra argus is a species of sea snail, a marine gastropod mollusc in the family Terebridae, the auger snails.

Subspecies

- Terebra argus argus Hinds, 1844: synonym of Terebra argus Hinds, 1844
- Terebra argus brachygyra Pilsbry, 1921: synonym of Terebra argus Hinds, 1844
