= Argosy (ship) =

Merchant ship or fleet

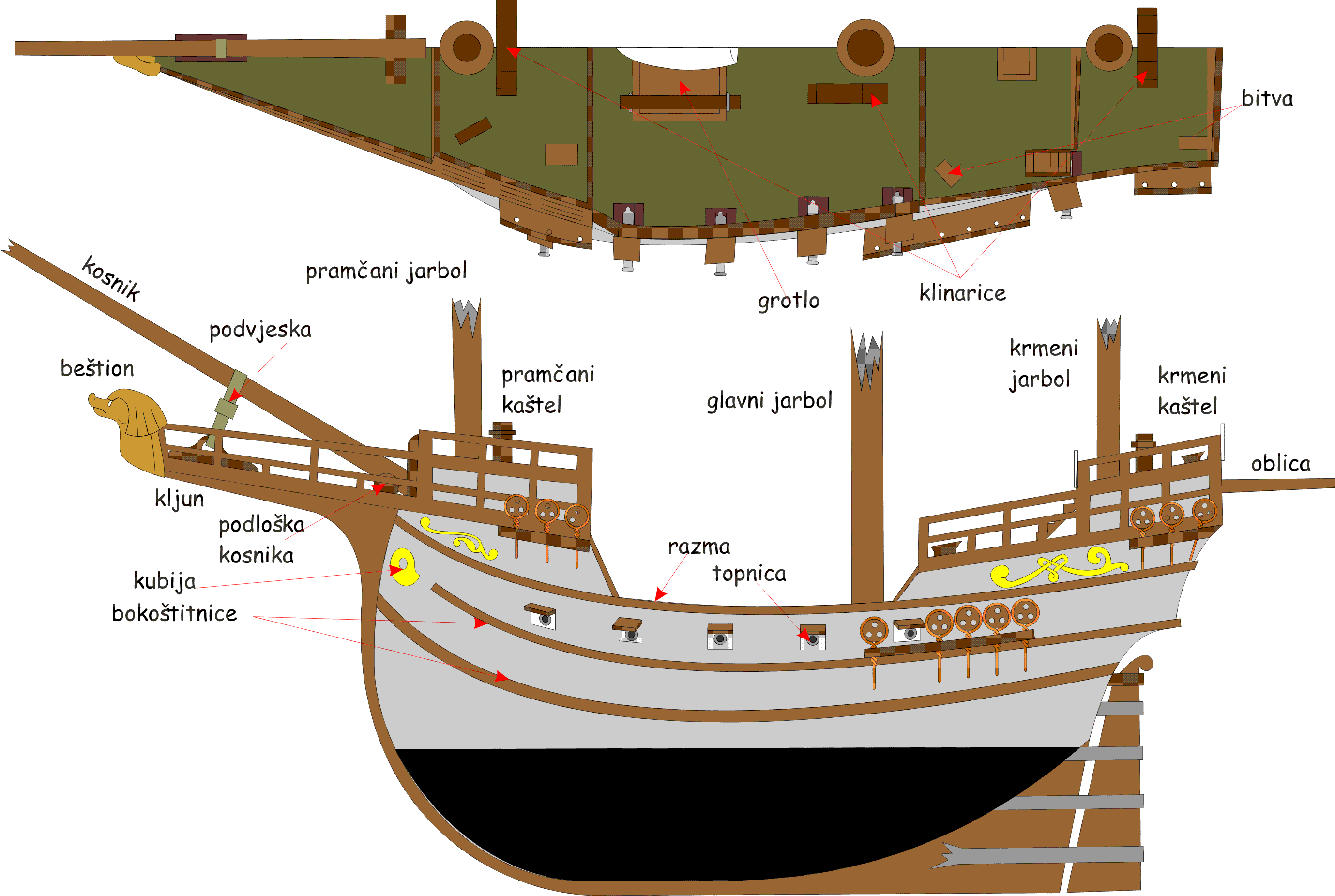

An argosy is a merchant ship, or a fleet of such ships. As used by Shakespeare (e.g., in King Henry VI, Part 3, Act 2, Scene VI; in the Merchant of Venice, Act 1, Scene I and Scene III; and in The Taming of the Shrew, Act 2, Scene I), the word means a flotilla of merchant ships operating together under the same ownership.

It is derived from the 16th century city Ragusa (now Dubrovnik, in Croatia), a major shipping power of the day and entered the language through the Italian ragusea, meaning a Ragusan ship. The word bears no relation to the ship Argo from Greek mythology (Jason and the Argonauts).

Since "argosy" and "odyssey" sound similar in British English and both refer to ships or voyage by ship ("odyssey" refers to Odysseus' journey, not to his ship, which goes unnamed in Homer's Odyssey), occasionally "argosy" is misused as a synonym for "odyssey", namely as an adventure.

== See also ==
- Republic of Ragusa
- Dubrovnik
- Merchant ships
