= The Argus (Dundalk) =

Regional newspaper in Ireland

- Type: Weekly newspaper
- Format: tabloid
- Owner(s): Mediahuis Ireland, a subsidiary of Mediahuis
- Editor: John Mulligan (Group Editor)
- Deputy editor: John Savage
- Founded: 1830
- Headquarters: Park Street, Dundalk
- Website: www.argus.ie

The Argus is a regional newspaper serving Dundalk, Ireland. The paper is owned by Mediahuis, through its subsidiary Mediahuis Ireland. The Argus is one of two non-free newspapers serving Dundalk, the other being the Dundalk Democrat.

The newspaper is named after Argus Panoptes, a hundred-eyed giant in Greek mythology. The newspaper’s staff work from home after the closure of their office in Park Street, Dundalk due to COVID-19 and cost-cutting measures.
