= Argos Hill =

Argos Hill may refer to a number of things.

- Argos Hill, Mayfield, a hamlet near Mayfield, United Kingdom
  - Argos Hill Mill, Mayfield, a windmill built thereon
- SS Argos Hill, a British cargo ship in service 1939–45.
