= South Wales Argus =

Evening daily tabloid newspaper published in Newport

The South Wales Argus
- South Wales Argus front page in July 2007
- Type: Daily newspaper
- Format: Tabloid
- Owner: USA Today Co.
- Publisher: Newsquest
- Editor: Gavin Thompson
- Founded: 1892
- Headquarters: 1st Floor, Chartist Tower, Upper Dock Street, Newport NP20 1DW
- Circulation: 3,154 (as of 2024)
- Website: southwalesargus.co.uk

The South Wales Argus is a daily tabloid newspaper published in Newport, South Wales. The Argus is distributed in Newport, Blaenau Gwent, Caerphilly, Monmouthshire, and Torfaen.

== History ==
The paper was founded as the South Wales Argus and Monmouthshire Daily Leader on 30 May 1892. An early description of the paper reads, "The South Wales Argus, the only evening paper printed and published in Newport and Monmouthshire was established in 1892, and the South Wales Weekly Argus and Star of Gwent the only weekly paper printed and published in Newport, was established in 1829. A leading object in the management has been to keep the legitimate claims of Newport and the County to the front, the proprietary including gentlemen, largely interested in the industrial, shipping, mining and commercial life of Newport, the neighbouring counties, and of South Wales generally". On 15 May 1896 the Monmouthshire Daily Leader part was dropped and latterly the definite article has also been dropped.

During the First World War it strongly supported the war effort and organised schemes to send cigarettes, footballs and other gifts to troops. It did, however, speak out against xenophobia, particularly condemning the treatment of Max Grabner. Although German by birth, Grabner was naturalised British and had a British wife and son serving in the British Army. In 1916 he was dismissed from his post as the teacher of modern languages at Newport Intermediate School. In 1918 he was refused a licence as a taxi driver by the town council, a decision that was condemned by the Argus as 'ugly spite'.

== Location ==
The paper used to have town centre offices in High Street, Newport. Then, from the 1970s until 2020 the paper was produced and edited from offices on Cardiff Road, Newport. However in 2018 it was announced that the site would be redeveloped by supermarket chain Lidl and the paper would relocate to a site in the city centre. The paper website now gives its address as 1st Floor, Chartist Tower, Upper Dock Street, Newport NP20 1DW

== Circulation ==
The Argus has an unknown circulation since deregistation from ABC, and is owned by Newsquest, a subsidiary of Gannett.

From its first publication until 7 March 2008 the paper was an evening paper printed in Newport. Since 10 March 2008 the paper has been a morning paper printed in Oxford or Worcester.

== Editors ==
The current editor is Gavin Thompson, who joined the paper in 2020. He replaced Nicole Garnon, who joined the paper in 1987 as a trainee reporter. She had also been the newspaper's health reporter, news editor and deputy editor.

Past editors include:

- Charles Stentiford (1892-1917)
- W. J. Townsend Collins (1917-1939)
- George Hoare (1939-1951)
- Kenneth Loveland (1951-1970)
- Ken Griffin (1970-1987)
- Steve Hoselitz (1987-1994)
- Gerry Keighley (1994-2012)
- Kevin Ward (2012-2016)
- Nicole Garnon (2016 - 2020)
