= Argus Coastal Monitoring =

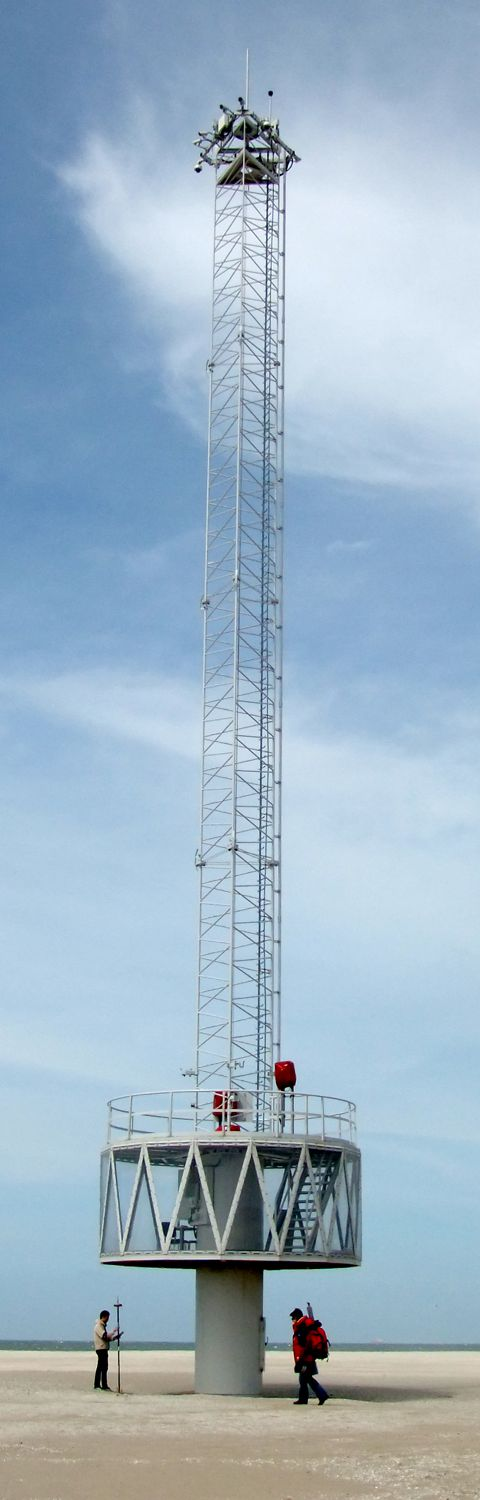
Argus tower at the Zandmotor (sand engine), the Netherlands

The use of video cameras to measure medium-term coastal processes was pioneered by Oregon State University in the late 1980s. Since the 1990s, OSU has collaborated with other universities and research institutes around the world to create a global network of Argus monitoring stations. Presently there are more than 30 active stations worldwide.

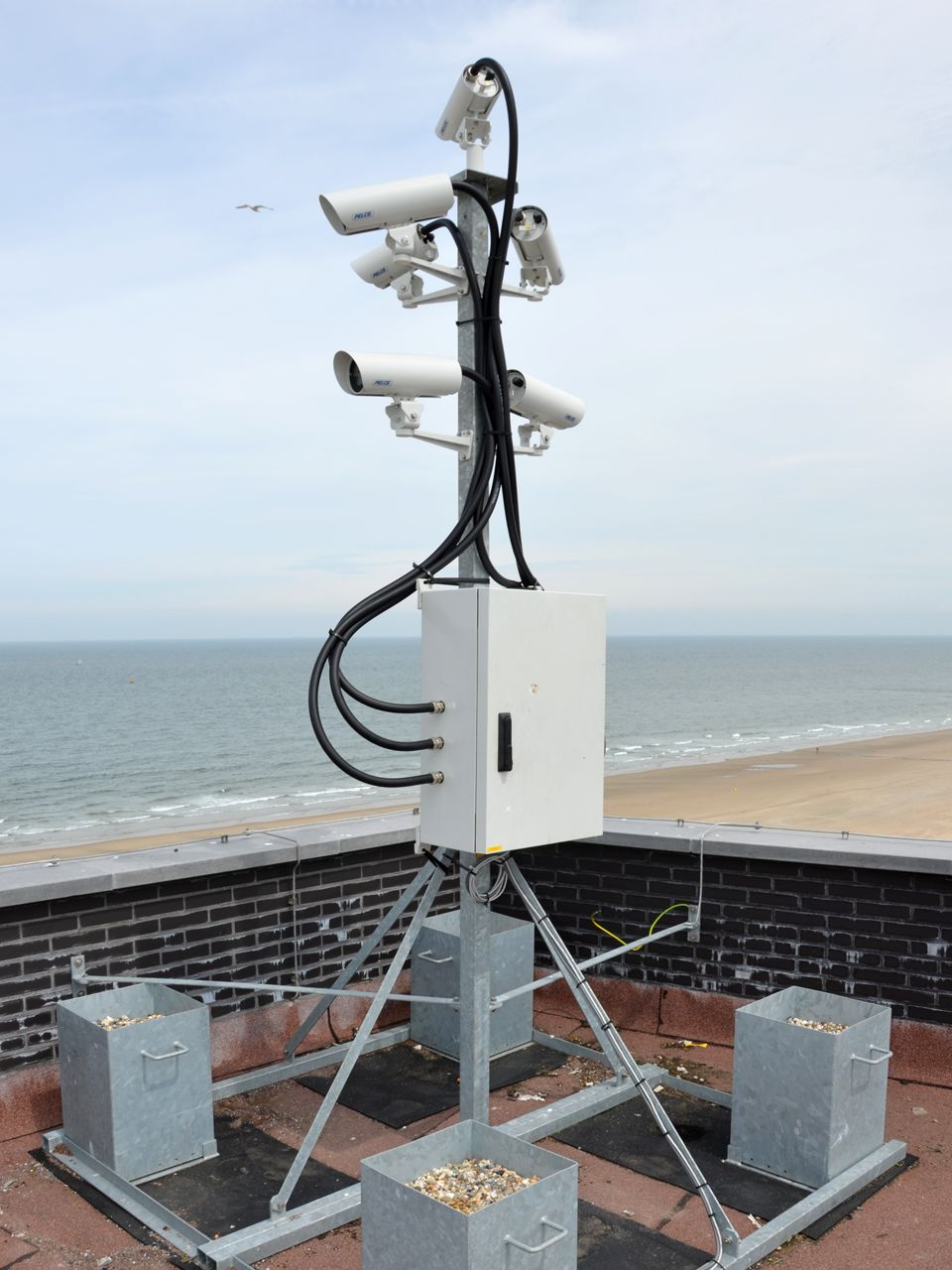
Gravity anchored frame for Argus cameras

An Argus station usually consists of three-to-six synchronized cameras that cover a stretch of beach up to five kilometers (three statute miles) centered at the station. Cameras are typically mounted on a tall building or other structure. Argus imagery can be used to determine shorelines, bathymetries, wave period and direction, and long-shore surface currents. Not all measurements are possible in all conditions. The major advantage of Argus is its long-term presence on the coast. Some sites have been collecting data for almost 20 years.

Argus imagery can also be integrated with other data sources (e.g., offshore buoys for wave amplitude) and numerical models to provide near-term predictions. One application under development is identifying dangers from rip currents to improve swimmer safety.

== Community ==
Argus is an international collaboration between many research institutes and universities. The most prominent are

- Coastal Imaging Laboratory at the OSU (US).
- Deltares (NL)
- United States Geological Survey (US)
- United States Naval Research Laboratory (US)
- WRL at the University of New South Wales (AU)
- Marine Institute at Plymouth University (UK)
- Geosciences at the University of Utrecht (NL)
- Civil Engineering and Geosciences at Delft University of Technology (NL)
- University of Twente (NL)
- NWRA (US)
