= Argus, Pennsylvania =

Unincorporated community in Pennsylvania, US

Argus
- Unincorporated community
- Location of Argus in Bucks County, Pennsylvania Argus (the United States)
- Coordinates: 40°21′59″N 75°22′59″W
- Country: United States
- State: Pennsylvania
- County: Bucks
- Township: West Rockhill
- Elevation: 495 ft (151 m)
- Time zone: UTC-5 (EST)
  - Summer (DST): UTC-4 (EDT)
- ZIP code: 18960
- Area codes: 215, 267, 445

Argus is an unincorporated community in Bucks County, Pennsylvania, United States. It operated a United States Post Office until 1953.

== Geography ==
Argus is located on Allentown Road in West Rockhill Township, approximately 4 miles (6.4 km) west of Sellersville in Bucks County. about 0.5 miles (0.80 km) from Montgomery County. Pennsylvania State Game Lands Number 196 is located just to the east.

== Sources ==
- Fretz, A Henry. 1953. Bucks County Place Names.
- Pennsylvania Department of Internal Affairs. Monthly Bulletin 21:2 p. 7-15, 29–32
- Pennsylvania Department of Internal Affairs. Monthly Bulletin 21:3 p. 18-24, 29–32
- Pennsylvania Department of Internal Affairs. Monthly Bulletin 21:4 p. 23-32
- Pennsylvania Department of Internal Affairs. Monthly Bulletin 21:5 p. 26-31
- Pennsylvania Department of Internal Affairs. Monthly Bulletin 41:6 31-32
