= February 1929 =

Month of 1929

<<	February 1929					>>
Su	Mo	Tu	We	Th	Fr	Sa
					1	2
3	4	5	6	7	8	9
10	11	12	13	14	15	16
17	18	19	20	21	22	23
24	25	26	27	28

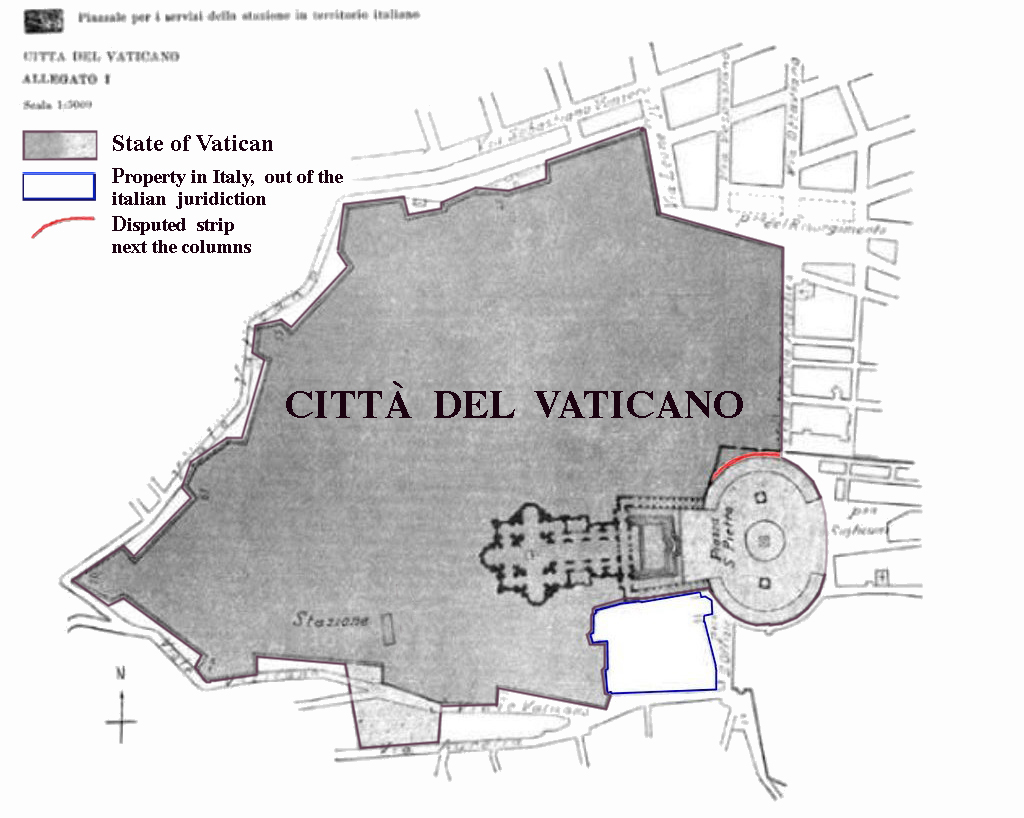
February 11, 1929: Lateran Treaty signed by Kingdom of Italy and the Holy See, creating nation of 49 hectares (181 acres) for Vatican City

The following events occurred in February 1929:

== Friday, February 1, 1929 ==
- Grigory Zinoviev and Lev Kamenev were placed under house arrest as 1,600 Trotskyists were exiled to Siberia.
- Antonín Švehla resigned as Prime Minister of Czechoslovakia due to ill health; he was replaced by František Udržal.
- The musical film The Broadway Melody opened at Grauman's Chinese Theatre in Hollywood.
- Born: Věra Chytilová, film director, in Ostrava, Czechoslovakia (d. 2014)
- Died: Walt Wilmot, 65, American baseball player

== Saturday, February 2, 1929 ==
- Norway annexed Peter I Island near Antarctica.

== Sunday, February 3, 1929 ==
- Martial law was declared in Valencia as Spanish troops put down an outbreak of anti-government revolt.
- Sonja Henie of Norway won the Ladies Competition of the World Figure Skating Championships in Budapest.
- Czechoslovakia defeated Poland 2–1 in the Ice Hockey European Championship Final.
- Born: Huntington Hardisty, American admiral (d. 2003)

== Monday, February 4, 1929 ==
- The one millionth Model A Ford automobile was completed.
- Born: Jerry Adler, theatre director and actor, in Brooklyn

== Tuesday, February 5, 1929 ==
- Éamon de Valera was arrested for entering Northern Ireland.
- Engineers of General Electric made a long-distance television broadcast, transmitting the face and voice of movie director D. W. Griffith from WGY in Schenectady, New York, to Los Angeles.
- The comic strip They'll Do It Every Time first appeared.
- Born:
  - Luc Ferrari, French composer, in Paris (d. 2005)
  - Al Worthington, baseball player, in Birmingham, Alabama

== Wednesday, February 6, 1929 ==
- Germany formally accepted the Kellogg-Briand Pact.
- Born: Sixten Jernberg, cross-country skier, in Lima, Sweden (d. 2012)
- Died:
  - Maria Christina of Austria, 70, Queen Mother of Spain
  - Charlotte Carmichael Stopes, 89, Scottish suffragist and author

== Thursday, February 7, 1929 ==
- The Federal Reserve Board issued a warning to the American public about "the excessive amount of the country's credit absorbed in speculative loans." The New York Stock Exchange took a tumble on the same day, which was blamed on the Bank of England raising its discount rate by 1 percentage point, to 5.5%.
- Born: Shosaku Numa, Japanese neuroscientist, in Wakayama, Japan (d. 1992)

== Friday, February 8, 1929 ==
- J. P. Morgan Jr. and Owen D. Young arrived in Paris ahead of a conference to formulate a new reparations plan for Germany to replace the Dawes Plan.
- Éamon de Valera was sentenced to one month in prison for illegally entering Northern Ireland.
- Fanny Brice and Billy Rose were married in New York City. Mayor Jimmy Walker performed the ceremony.

== Saturday, February 9, 1929 ==
- Delegates from Estonia, Latvia, Poland, Romania, and the Soviet Union signed Litvinov's Pact, a treaty renouncing war along the same principles as the Kellogg-Briand Pact.
- Members of the Viet Nam Quoc Dan Dang, a Vietnamese nationalist organization in French Indochina assassinated French labor recruiter Alfred François Bazin, prompting a crackdown by French colonial authorities.
- José de León Toral, 28, the assassin of Mexican president-elect Álvaro Obregón, was executed by a firing squad.

== Sunday, February 10, 1929 ==
- Mexican President Emilio Portes Gil survived an assassination attempt when the train he was riding in was dynamited. A fireman was killed but Portes Gil was unhurt.
- The partly talking film The Jazz Age, starring Douglas Fairbanks Jr. and Marceline Day, was released.
- The National School of Economics was founded in Mexico.
- Born: Hallgeir Brenden, Norwegian cross-country skier, in Tørberget (d. 2007)

== Monday, February 11, 1929 ==
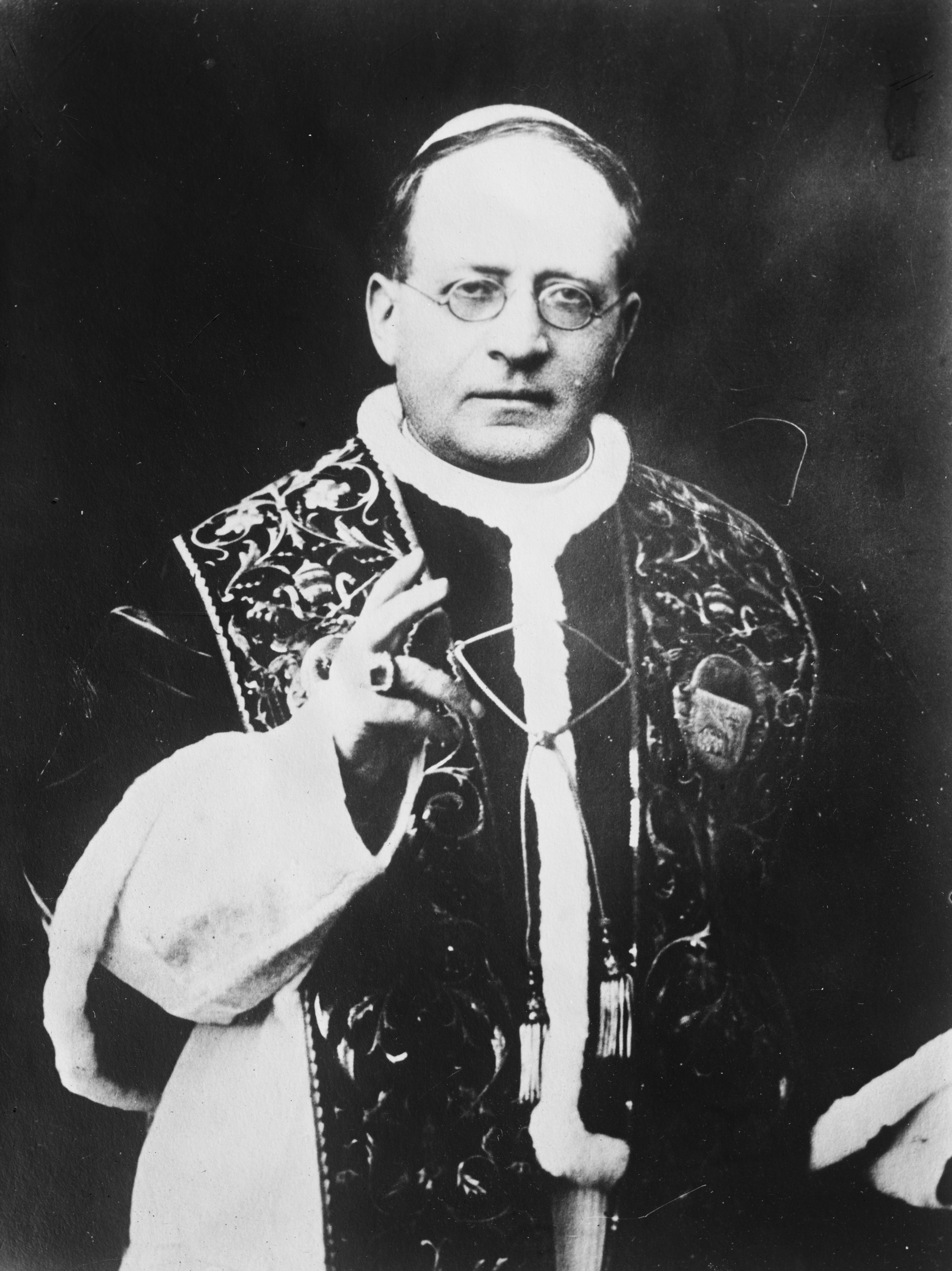
Ambrogio Ratti, head of state of Vatican City as Pope Pius XI

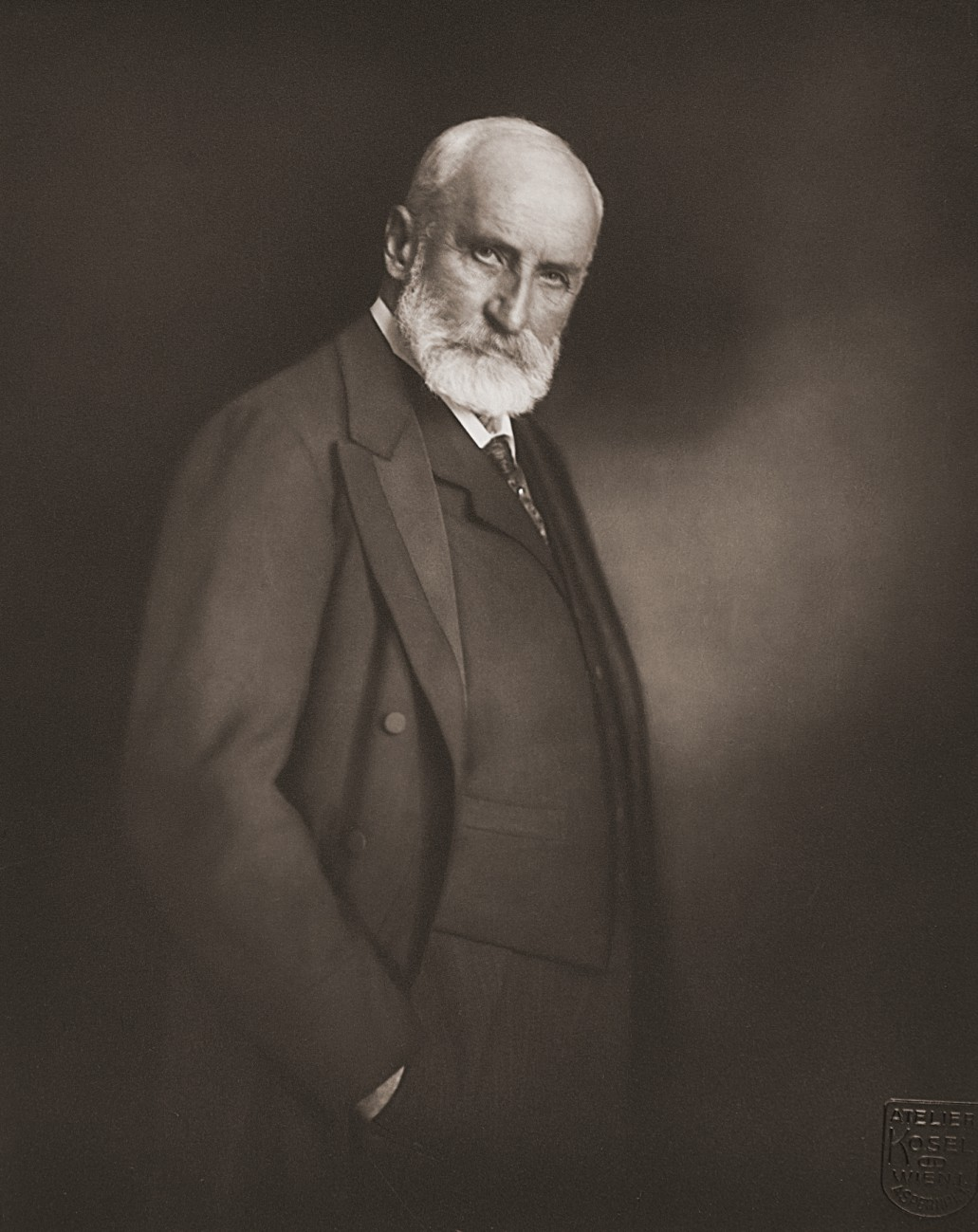
Prince Johann II, monarch of Liechtenstein for 70 years

- The Kingdom of Italy and the Holy See signed the Lateran Treaty, finally settling the Roman Question. Vatican City became an independent state within the city of Rome.
- The Young Committee began deliberations in Paris attempting to restructure the Dawes Plan.
- The Eugene O'Neill play Dynamo opened at the Martin Beck Theatre on Broadway.
- Lowest ever temperature was recorded in Slovakia. The temperature of -41,0 °C was recorded in Vígľaš. As of 2022, the record remains in place.
- Died: Johann II, Prince of Liechtenstein, 88. Having succeeded to the throne in 1858 his reign of 70 years is the second-longest in European royal history, and the longest precisely documented tenure of any monarch without a regent since antiquity. His 75-year-old brother, Franz, became the new monarch.

== Tuesday, February 12, 1929 ==
- Reichsbank President Hjalmar Schacht said in a speech before international delegates that Germany could no longer make its payments under the Dawes Plan.
- American ambassador Dwight Morrow and his wife Elizabeth announced the engagement of their daughter Anne Morrow to aviator Charles Lindbergh.
- Exiled Soviet politician Leon Trotsky arrived in Istanbul, Turkey. The government of Mustafa Kemal Atatürk had an agreement with Joseph Stalin that no attempt to assassinate Trotsky would be made on Turkish soil.
- Died: Lillie Langtry, 75, British singer and actress

== Wednesday, February 13, 1929 ==
- In his final significant act as President of the United States, Calvin Coolidge signed a naval bill to construct 15 new cruisers and an aircraft carrier.

== Thursday, February 14, 1929 ==
- The Saint Valentine's Day Massacre occurred at a garage in Chicago as four unknown assailants, posing as police officers, murdered five members of Bugs Moran's North Side Gang led by Bugs Moran along with two garage employees.
- Died:
  - Thomas Burke, 54, American sprinter;
  - Peter and Frank Gusenberg, 39 and 36, American gangsters, were shot and killed during the Saint Valentine's Day Massacre

== Friday, February 15, 1929 ==
- Esme Howard, the British Ambassador to the United States, said that Britain would call for a new naval disarmament conference in reaction to the American naval construction bill.
- The Federal Reserve Advisory Council issued a statement backing up the Federal Reserve Board's recent warning against speculative loans.
- Born:
  - Graham Hill, British racing driver, Formula One world champion in 1962 and 1968; in Hampstead, London (killed in plane crash, 1975)
  - James R. Schlesinger, U.S. Secretary of Defense (1973–1975) and later the first U.S. Secretary of Energy (1977–1979); in New York City (d. 2014)
  - Kauko Armas Nieminen, Finnish pseudoscientist who published books about his theory of physics that vortices in the luminiferous aether of outer space could explain gravity and other forces; in Kuopio (d. 2010)

== Saturday, February 16, 1929 ==
- The New York Stock Exchange posted widespread losses after the Federal Reserve Advisory Council's warning of the previous day.

== Sunday, February 17, 1929 ==
- It was announced that John D. Rockefeller Jr. had purchased Wakefield estate, the birthplace of George Washington, in Westmoreland County, Virginia. The $115,000 purchase was made for an association that planned to turn the estate into a national monument in time for 1932, the 200th anniversary of Washington's birth.
- Born: Patricia Routledge, English comedian and actress known for portraying Hyacinth Bucket on the TV show Keeping Up Appearances; in Tranmere, Merseyside (d. 2025)

== Monday, February 18, 1929 ==
- The results of voting for the very first Academy Awards were announced without fanfare, when the names of the winners published on the back page of the newsletter for the Academy of Motion Picture Arts and Sciences. The actual awards would be handed out in a ceremony on May 16.
- The Migratory Bird Conservation Act was enacted in the United States.
- The U.S. Supreme Court decided Taft v. Bowers, holding that the increase in value of a donated gift was taxable to the recipient.
- Born: Len Deighton, English author, in Marylebone, London
- Died: William Russell, 44, American actor, died of pneumonia

== Tuesday, February 19, 1929 ==
- Five thousand homes along the Tietê River in Brazil were submerged during the country's worst flooding in four decades.
- The government of British Prime Minister Stanley Baldwin narrowly avoided defeat on an impending vote over the amount of compensation to be paid to Irish loyalists for losses taken since the truce in the Irish Free State. After many Conservative members voiced their intent to vote against the government for committing an amount they considered to be too low, Baldwin adjourned the debate with a view to reconsider the matter.

== Wednesday, February 20, 1929 ==
- British Foreign Affairs Secretary Austen Chamberlain was severely heckled in the House of Commons over the recent statement of ambassador Esme Howard suggesting that Britain would ask for a naval disarmament conference. Chamberlain seemingly contradicted Howard's assertion by insisting that the government had "no intention of issuing an invitation for a conference on this subject", and that Howard's statement was merely a personal opinion as to the possible course of events.
- Federación Atlética de Bolivia (FAB), the governing body for athletics in Bolivia, was founded.
- Born: Amanda Blake (stage name for Beverly Neill), American stage, film and TV actress known for her role as "Miss Kitty" on Gunsmoke for 19 seasons; in Buffalo, New York (d. 1989)

== Thursday, February 21, 1929 ==
- Charles Lindbergh was appointed Federal Aviation Advisor to the U.S. Department of Commerce.
- The partly talking adventure film The Iron Mask, starring Douglas Fairbanks in his first speaking screen role, premiered at the Rivoli Theatre in New York City.
- In the first battle of the Warlord Rebellion in northeastern Shandong against the Nationalist government of China, a 24,000-strong rebel force led by Zhang Zongchang was defeated at Zhifu by 7,000 NRA troops.

== Friday, February 22, 1929 ==
- U.S. President Calvin Coolidge was awarded an honorary degree as a Doctor of Law by George Washington University. Coolidge delivered a commencement speech which doubled as a farewell address to the American public. In the speech Coolidge paid tribute to George Washington on the occasion of his 197th birthday and reminded listeners that Washington's own Farewell Address warned against forging permanent alliances with foreign powers.
- Born:
  - Ryne Duren, baseball player, in Cazenovia, Wisconsin (d. 2011)
  - James Hong, actor and director, in Minneapolis, Minnesota

== Saturday, February 23, 1929 ==
- The silent drama film Wild Orchids starring Greta Garbo was released.
- Born: Elston Howard, American baseball player, in St. Louis (d. 1980)

== Sunday, February 24, 1929 ==
- The Utrecht newspaper Dagblad published an article reporting the details of the Franco-Belgian Accord, a secret military treaty between France and Belgium in effect since 1920. The alliance was primarily aimed at Germany but was also seen as threatening to the Dutch.
- Born: Zdzisław Beksiński, Polish artist, in Sanok (d. 2005)
- Died: Frank Keenan, 70, American actor, director and manager

== Monday, February 25, 1929 ==
- The foreign ministries of France and Belgium denounced the previous day's report in the Utrecht Dagblad as inaccurate. The Belgian ministry admitted that there had been a secret agreement but called the article's charges "absurd".
- An unknown man broke into a home in Miami Beach, Florida, where retired boxing champion Jack Dempsey was staying. The man fired a revolver when Dempsey jumped out of bed, but the bullet missed and the prowler retreated out the bedroom window and fled with an accomplice. It was not known whether it was a random burglary attempt or some kind of kidnapping plot against Dempsey.

== Tuesday, February 26, 1929 ==
- Grand Teton National Park in Wyoming was established.
- Born: Ray Mathews, American football player, in Dayton, Pennsylvania (d. 2015)

== Wednesday, February 27, 1929 ==
- Turkey signed Litvinov's Pact.
- Jack Sharkey beat Young Stribling by 10-round decision before a crowd of 35,000 in Miami Beach, Florida.
- Charles Lindbergh and fiancée Anne Morrow escaped serious injury when the plane Lindbergh was piloting turned over upon landing at an airfield outside of Mexico City. Lindbergh dislocated his right shoulder in the accident but was able to drive back to the site of the crash after receiving medical treatment at the embassy. The accident was caused by a lost landing wheel.
- The talking film Hearts in Dixie, starring Stepin Fetchit, opened at the Gaiety Theatre in New York City.
- Died: Briton Hadden, 31, co-founder of Time magazine, from sepsis

== Thursday, February 28, 1929 ==
- A police raid on communist headquarters in Hungary resulted in 60 arrests of mostly Russian or German nationals. Police claimed they had foiled a communist plot to overthrow the government.
- The Chicago Black Hawks hockey team failed to score a goal for the eighth consecutive game, setting an all-time National Hockey League record for futility that still stands.
