= March 1929 =

Month of 1929

<<	March 1929					>>
Su	Mo	Tu	We	Th	Fr	Sa
					1	2
3	4	5	6	7	8	9
10	11	12	13	14	15	16
17	18	19	20	21	22	23
24	25	26	27	28	29	30
31

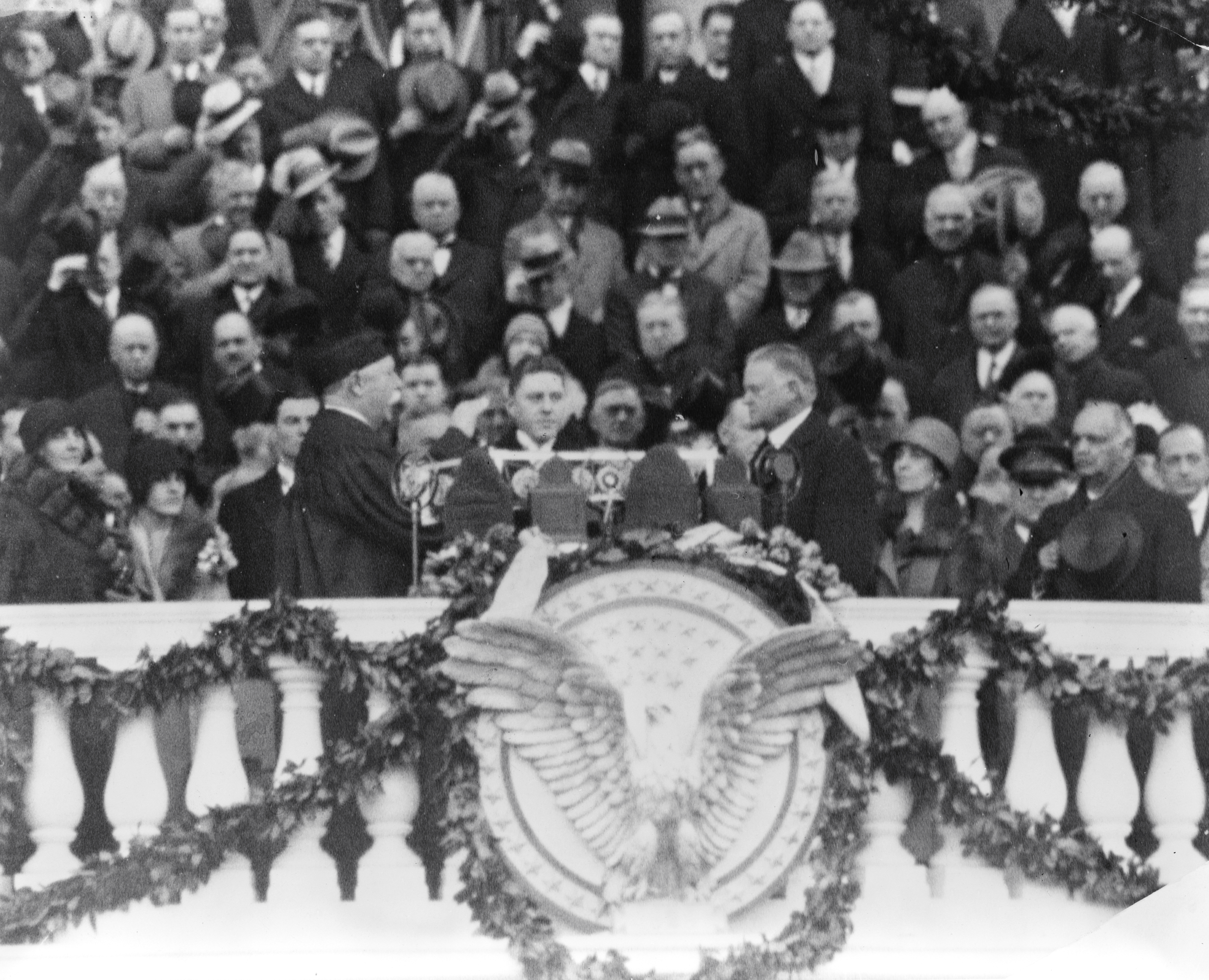
March 4, 1929: Herbert Hoover sworn into office as 31st President of the United States by Chief Justice William Howard Taft, 27th President of the United States

The following events occurred in March 1929:

== Friday, March 1, 1929 ==
- The French Parliament ratified the Kellogg-Briand Pact.
- Born: Georgi Markov, Bulgarian dissident writer, in Sofia (d. 1978)
- Died: Royal H. Weller, 47, American politician

== Saturday, March 2, 1929 ==
- Coal miners in New South Wales, Australia were locked out by their employers for refusing to accept a wage cut.
- A regiment of the Chinese National Revolutionary Army loyal to warlord Zhang Zongchang began a revolt in western Beijing, throwing the city into chaos. Though the uprising was quickly crushed by loyalist soldiers, martial law was consequently declared in the city.
- The Increased Penalties Act was enacted in the United States, increasing the penalties for violating Prohibition.
- During a meet with the University of Chicago, Illinois Fighting Illini wrestler Allie Morrison, a 1928 Olympic gold medalist, fractured some of the vertebrae in his neck. Although he would complete the season, doctors would convince him to retire from competition to avoid paralysis.
- The San Francisco Bay toll bridge (since replaced by the San Mateo–Hayward Bridge) opened. Measuring 12 miles (19 km), it was the longest bridge in the world at the time.
- Died: Sir Edward Hobart Seymour, 88, British admiral

== Sunday, March 3, 1929 ==
- An Italian commission released the findings of its investigation into the airship Italia disaster. The report assigned virtually all of the blame to North Pole expedition commander Umberto Nobile.
- A death toll of 2,390 people in France was reported for the recently ended ten days of extremely cold weather.
- William Fox of the Fox Film Corporation announced a merger with the Loew's theatre chain.
- Mexican rebels seized Nogales and Veracruz as fighting in the Cristero War flared up again.

== Monday, March 4, 1929 ==
- The Inauguration of Herbert Hoover as 31st President of the United States took place in Washington, D.C. This was the first presidential inauguration to be recorded by sound newsreels, though the microphone did not project Hoover's voice well.

== Tuesday, March 5, 1929 ==
- Gillis Grafström of Sweden won the Men's Competition of the World Figure Skating Championships in London.
- Latvia ratified Litvinov's Pact.
- Died: David Dunbar Buick, 74, Scottish-American inventor

== Wednesday, March 6, 1929 ==
- Turkey and Bulgaria signed a treaty of friendship.
- Born: Günter Kunert, writer, in Berlin (d. 2019)

== Thursday, March 7, 1929 ==
- U.S. President Herbert Hoover issued his first presidential proclamation, calling a special session of the United States Congress for April 15 to pass a farm relief bill.
- The talking drama film The Letter, starring Jeanne Eagels, premiered at the Criterion Theatre in New York City.
- Joe Davis won his third world title at the World Snooker Championship in England.

== Friday, March 8, 1929 ==
- Rebel troops in the Cristero War captured Juárez.
- Born: Hebe Camargo, television presenter, actor and singer, in Taubaté, Brazil (d. 2012)

== Saturday, March 9, 1929 ==
- Charles Lindbergh flew from Mexico City to Brownsville, Texas, to inaugurate air mail between the two cities. Lindbergh, carrying 9 passengers and 12 pouches of mail, flew over rebel lines during the flight.
- Princess Isabel Alfonsa of Bourbon-Two Sicilies married Polish Count Jan Kanty Zamoyski in Madrid.
- Born: Zillur Rahman, 15th President of Bangladesh, in Bhairab Upazila, British India (d. 2013)

== Sunday, March 10, 1929 ==
- The army of General Plutarco Elías Calles retook the strategic rail center of Cañitas as Mexican government forces counterattacked.
- The Egyptian government granted limited rights of divorce to women.

== Monday, March 11, 1929 ==
- Henry Segrave set a new land speed record of 231 mph at Daytona Beach in his Golden Arrow racer.
- The U.S. Supreme Court decided Nutt v. National Institute Inc..

== Tuesday, March 12, 1929 ==
- Mexican rebels retreated from Saltillo as President Emilio Portes Gil issued a statement saying the revolution had been defeated.
- Sir Arthur Conan Doyle was giving a lecture on the paranormal in Nairobi when he displayed a photograph of a supposed ghost in a haunted house in Nottingham. A well-known Nairobi dentist bolted out of his seat and identified himself as the "ghost", explaining that he had posed for the photo in a white sheet some years ago as a trick after he and other members of a party had investigated the house for two weeks and had failed to find any ghost. Doyle accepted the man's explanation, expressed regret at being hoaxed and said he would not show the photograph again.
- The silent comedy film Why Be Good? was released.
- Died: Asa Griggs Candler, 77, American businessman known for his invention of Coca-Cola in 1886

== Wednesday, March 13, 1929 ==
- Leon Trotsky gave his first interview to the foreign press in his apartment in Turkey, saying he was writing a book tracing the history of his opposition to Joseph Stalin and expressing a desire to go to Germany because he preferred the care of German physicians.
- Born: Peter Breck, actor, in Rochester, New York (d. 2012)
- Died: Sherry Magee, 44, American baseball player, died of pneumonia

== Thursday, March 14, 1929 ==
- Elba, Alabama, was submerged under 10 feet of flood water when the Pea River overflowed. Alabama Governor Bibb Graves delivered a radio broadcast pleading for urgent relief efforts.
- The Fox Film Corporation, Pathé News and Paramount News unanimously declared after checking their inauguration film footage that Chief Justice William Howard Taft had misstated the Oath of Office when he called on Herbert Hoover to swear to "preserve, maintain and defend the Constitution of the United States", substituting the word "maintain" for "protect". The flub had been caught by 13-year-old student Helen Terwilliger, who had listened to the live radio broadcast of the inauguration in eighth-grade history class in Walden, New York, and politely wrote to Taft about the error. Taft later laughed off his mistake by saying, "I think you'll have to get along with what I've already said. After all, I don't think it's important."

== Friday, March 15, 1929 ==
- Severe flooding spread to the states of Georgia and Florida.
- Mexican government forces captured Durango.
- Died: Pinetop Smith, 24, American blues pianist, was shot to death.

== Saturday, March 16, 1929 ==
- The Confederación Sudamericana de Natación (South American Swimming Confederation) was formed in Santiago, Chile.
- The talking musical drama film Queen of the Night Clubs starring Texas Guinan was released.
- Estonia ratified Litvinov's Pact.

== Sunday, March 17, 1929 ==
- The second of the Davos University Conferences opened in Switzerland. The second one included the Cassirer–Heidegger debate in philosophy.
- The part silent, part sound romantic drama film Show Boat premiered in Palm Beach, Florida.
- The Mickey Mouse cartoon short Plane Crazy was released. It was the first Mickey Mouse film made but the fourth to be shown in theaters.
- Sociologist and NAACP co-founder W. E. B. DuBois debated white supremacist Lothrop Stoddard in a Chicago auditorium. The topic, ‘’Shall the Negro Be Encouraged to Seek Cultural Equality?’’, drew an audience of 5,000.

== Monday, March 18, 1929 ==
- Mexican President Emilio Portes Gil announced that the rebels had opened negotiations for terms of peace.
- Died: William P. Cronan, 50, former U.S. Naval Governor of Guam

== Tuesday, March 19, 1929 ==
- The Pavilion Theatre opened in Bournemouth, England.
- Born: Miquel Martí i Pol, Spanish poet, in Catalonia (d. 2003)

== Wednesday, March 20, 1929 ==
- Al Capone appeared before the federal grand jury in Chicago and gave testimony about his alleged activities in the bootlegging trade.
- Born: William Andrew MacKay, lawyer and judge, in Halifax, Nova Scotia (d. 2013)
- Died: Marshal Ferdinand Foch, 77, French Army leader during World War One.

== Thursday, March 21, 1929 ==
- An explosion at the Kinloch coal mine in Parnassus, Pennsylvania, killed 46 miners.

== Friday, March 22, 1929 ==
- The Canadian rum-running ship I'm Alone was shelled and sunk by the U.S. Coast Guard off the coast of Louisiana when it refused orders to stop. One crew member was killed and the incident caused some tension in Canada–United States relations.
- Gregalach won the Grand National horse race.
- The historical film The Divine Lady, with music and sound effects but no audible dialogue, premiered at the Warner's Theatre in New York.
- Born: Morris "Mort" Drucker, caricaturist and comics artist known for his illustrations in Mad magazine; in Brooklyn (d. 2020)

== Saturday, March 23, 1929 ==
- The University of Cambridge won the 81st Boat Race. The victory evened the overall record against Oxford at 40 wins each.
- Born:
  - Roger Bannister, English athlete who was the first person to run one mile in less than four minutes; in Harrow, London (d. 2018)
  - Mark Rydell, American actor, director and producer; in New York City
- Died: Denny Williams, 35, American baseball player who had played in the 1928 season, was killed when a car struck and overturned the automobile in which he was riding.

== Sunday, March 24, 1929 ==
- The National Fascist Party won general elections in Italy with over 98% of the vote. Opposition parties were banned and the electorate merely voted 'yes' or 'no' to a single list of candidates.
- One hundred thousand mourners filed past the coffin of Ferdinand Foch enshrined underneath the Arc de Triomphe in Paris. One man was killed and many injured in the crush to file past the flag-draped bier.
- The musical film Syncopation, the first movie ever released by RKO Pictures, opened.

== Monday, March 25, 1929 ==
- Jackie Fields defeated Jack Thompson by 10-round decision in Chicago to claim the vacant world welterweight title. 35 were injured in a riot that broke out in the eighth round after two black spectators took offense to something that a heckler yelled at the African-American boxer Thompson.
- Born: William R. Richardson, U.S. Army general, in Taizhou, Jiangsu, China (d. 2023); Cecil Taylor, pianist and poet, in New York City (d. 2018)
- Died: Jan Kubisz, 81, Polish educator and poet

== Tuesday, March 26, 1929 ==
- Ferdinand Foch was buried in Les Invalides. Nearly 2 million people lined the streets to watch the procession of the gun carriage bearing his coffin from Notre-Dame de Paris cathedral.
- Died: John Lubbock, 2nd Baron Avebury, 70, English aristocrat and banker

== Wednesday, March 27, 1929 ==
- Al Capone appeared before a grand jury in Chicago for the second time in a week. After completing his testimony he was arrested for contempt of court and released after posting $500 bail.
- Born: Rita Briggs, American baseball player for the AAGPBL from 1947 to 1954; in Ayer, Massachusetts (d. 1994)

== Thursday, March 28, 1929 ==
- China and Japan signed the Shandong Agreement; Japan agreed to withdraw from Shandong and pay government damages, but not indemnities.
- Rumors were confirmed that RCA had sold its communication interests to the International Telephone & Telegraph company in exchange for $100 million worth of stock.
- Chicago Stadium opened with a boxing card; Tommy Loughran retained the World Light heavyweight Title with a split decision over Mickey Walker.
- The Mickey Mouse cartoon short The Opry House was released. It marked the first time Mickey wore gloves.

== Friday, March 29, 1929 ==
- The Boston Bruins won their first Stanley Cup, beating the defending champion New York Rangers by a 2–1 score to sweep the finals, two games to none.
- The Battle of Sabilla was fought in the Ikhwan Revolt.
- Born: Lennart Meri, writer, film director and the first President of Estonia since it regained independence; from 1992 to 2001, in Tallinn (d. 2006)

== Saturday, March 30, 1929 ==
- Hapoel Allenby Tel Aviv defeated Maccabi Hasmonean Jerusalem 4–0 to win the Palestine Cup.
- The drama film Christina, with synchronized sound effects and music but no audible dialogue, premiered at the Gaiety Theatre in New York City.

== Sunday, March 31, 1929 ==
- The second Trans-American Footrace, nicknamed the "Bunion Derby", began in New York City. 77 runners were competing for a total of $60,000 in prize money awarded to the first 15 people to reach the finish line in Los Angeles.
- The airplane Southern Cross and its crew temporarily went missing over northwest Australia, on the first leg of an attempt to fly from Sydney to England.
- Died: Myron T. Herrick, 74, American politician and U.S. Ambassador to France
