= April 1929 =

Month of 1929

<<	April 1929					>>
Su	Mo	Tu	We	Th	Fr	Sa
	1	2	3	4	5	6
7	8	9	10	11	12	13
14	15	16	17	18	19	20
21	22	23	24	25	26	27
28	29	30

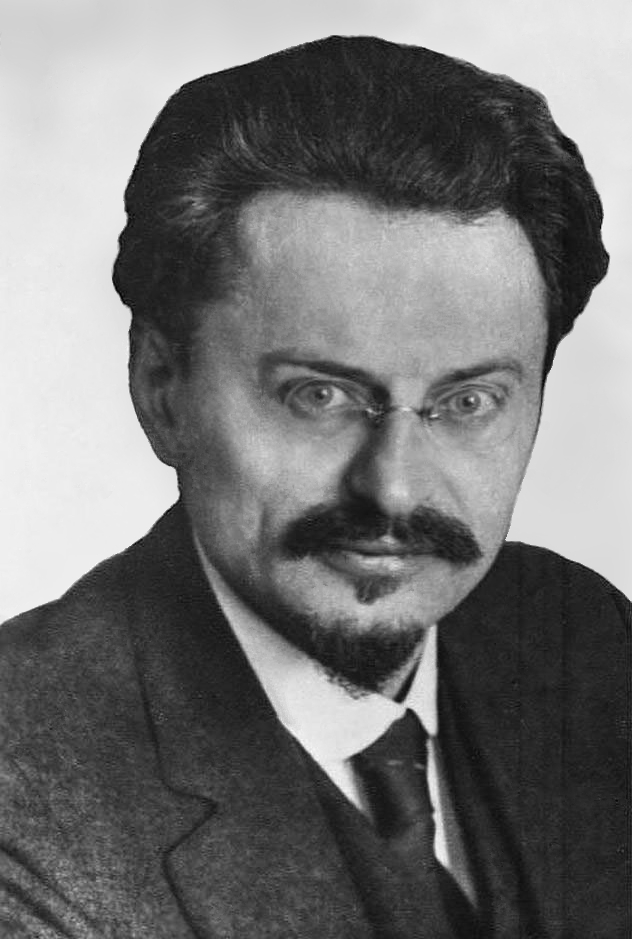
April 11, 1929: Soviet Marxist exile Leon Trotsky barred from Germany

April 11, 1929: Benito Mussolini changes Kingdom of Italy's coat of arms to incorporate the fasces, symbol of the Fascist Party

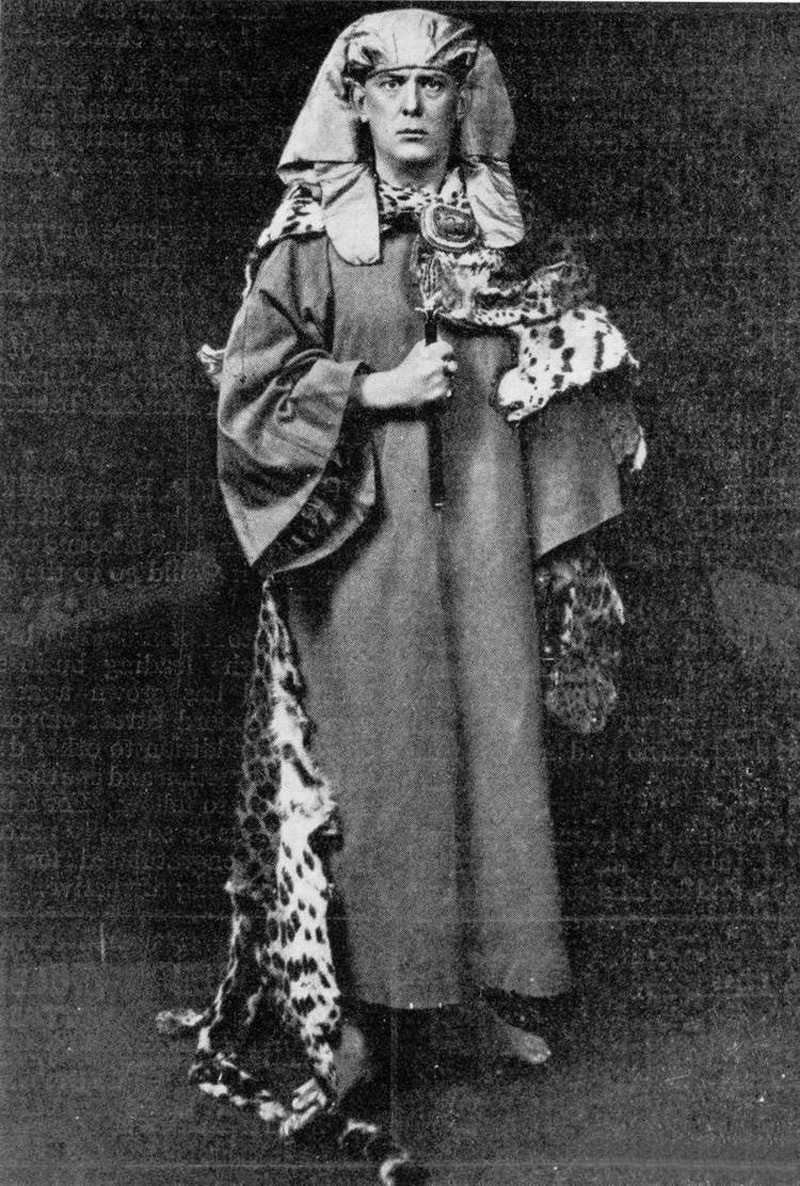
April 16, 1929: English occultist Aleister Crowley barred from France

The following events occurred in April 1929:

== Monday, April 1, 1929 ==
- Industrialist William C. Durant addressed telegrams to 100 leading executives asking them if they agreed with the suggestion of the Federal Reserve Board that market prices of the securities of their companies were artificially high. "At a time when banking reserves of the country are in no way threatened, the Federal Reserve Board, by questioning the right of banks to loan on stock market collateral, is giving the public the impression that our best securities are selling above their market value", Durant wrote in the telegram. "It is my belief that the attitude of the Board, the method of handling and the thoughtless character of the publicity are most harmful to our business interests and threatening the prosperity of the country."
- The Five Nations Championship tournament of rugby concluded; Scotland won the championship with 3 wins against 1 loss.
- The Loray Mill Strike in Gastonia, North Carolina, began.
- Born:
  - Barbara Bryne, English actress, in London (d. 2021)
  - Milan Kundera, writer, in Brno, Czechoslovakia (d. 2023)
  - Jane Powell, actor, dancer and actress, in Portland, Oregon (d. 2021)

== Tuesday, April 2, 1929 ==
- In a special referendum in Wisconsin, almost two-thirds of voters approved repealing the state's prohibition enforcement act and legalizing 2.75% beer. The vote was not binding upon state lawmakers.
- British Foreign Affairs Minister Austen Chamberlain met with Benito Mussolini in Florence to discuss European policies.
- Born: Ed Dorn, poet, in Villa Grove, Illinois (d. 1999)

== Wednesday, April 3, 1929 ==
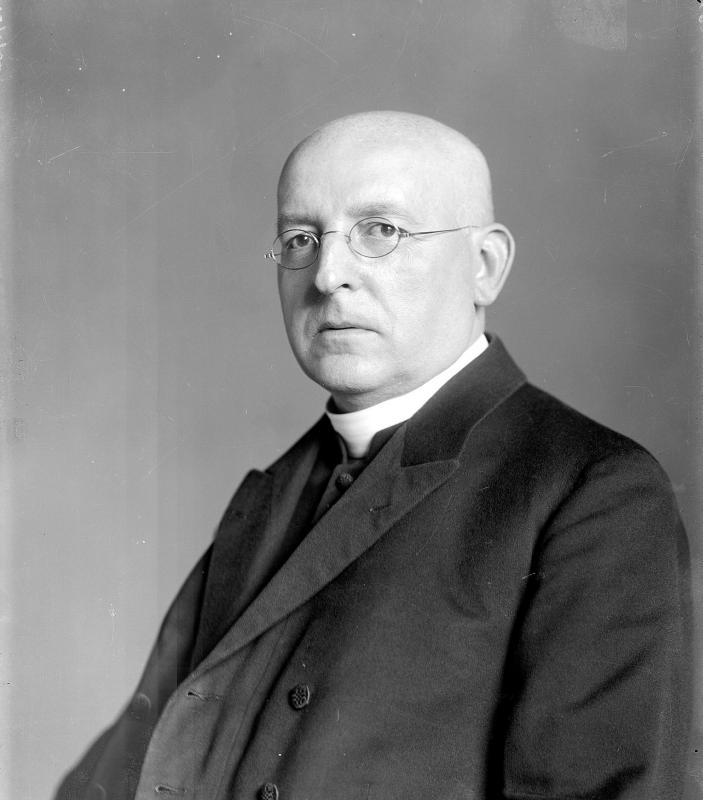
Ignaz Seipel

- Ignaz Seipel resigned as Chancellor of Austria when his coalition government broke down.
- Born: Poul Schlüter, Prime Minister of Denmark; in Tønder (d. 2021)

== Thursday, April 4, 1929 ==
- Twenty people were killed and 59 injured in a train derailment near Buzău in Romania.
- Died:
  - Karl Benz, 84, German engineer and car designer
  - William Michael Crose, 62, U.S. Navy Commander and the seventh Naval Governor of American Samoa

== Friday, April 5, 1929 ==
- Canada sent a note of protest to the United States over the sinking of the rum-running ship I'm Alone, saying the U.S. Coast Guard violated international law by shelling and sinking the ship.
- Born:
  - Ivar Giaever, Norwegian physicist and Nobel laureate in Bergen
  - Nigel Hawthorne, English actor in Coventry (d. 2001)

== Saturday, April 6, 1929 ==
- Citizens of the tiny German archipelago of Heligoland attacked the building of a local pro-German newspaper as they staged a demonstration calling for the return to British rule.
- The Buster Keaton silent comedy film Spite Marriage was released.

== Sunday, April 7, 1929 ==
- Austro-Italian relations deteriorated over a football match after Austria defeated Italy 3–0 in Central European International Cup play. Italians complained that a sideways Hungarian flag was used to represent Italy and that the Austrian band played the wrong Italian song. Italian newspapers also accused the Austrians of unfair play and called for a refusal to float the country any new loans.

== Monday, April 8, 1929 ==
- Indian revolutionaries Batukeshwar Dutt and Bhagat Singh threw bombs from the gallery of the Central Legislative Assembly in New Delhi at the government benches. Five were wounded but there were no deaths and the duo were quickly arrested.
- The musical film The Desert Song premiered in Los Angeles.
- The talking crime film Alibi premiered at the 44th Street Theatre in New York City.

== Tuesday, April 9, 1929 ==
- The surviving crew of the rumrunner boat I'm Alone was released at the request of a U.S. District Attorney in New Orleans. No reason was given for the dismissal of charges.

== Wednesday, April 10, 1929 ==
- Fifty people were killed by tornadoes that swept through northern Arkansas.
- Born:
  - Mike Hawthorn, English racing driver, in Mexborough (d. 1959)
  - Max von Sydow, Swedish-born U.S. film actor, in Lund, Sweden (d. 2020)

== Thursday, April 11, 1929 ==
- The German government refused to grant political asylum to Leon Trotsky.

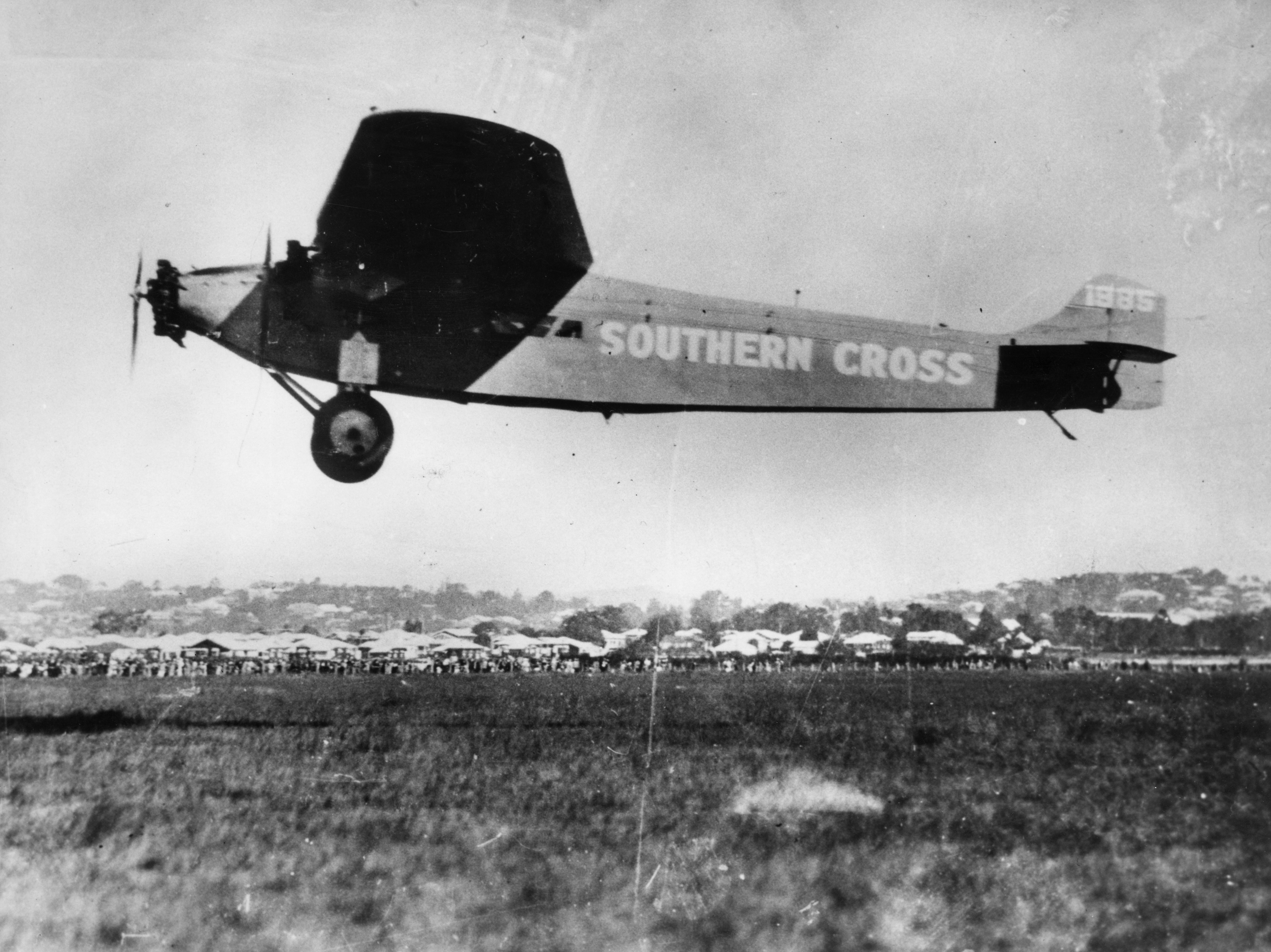
The Southern Cross

- The four-man crew of the airplane Southern Cross was found alive and well east of Wyndham by search pilots, twelve days after the plane went missing above northwest Australia.
- The Coat of Arms of Italy was modified to include a pair of fasces, replacing the Savoy lions.

== Friday, April 12, 1929 ==
- Arches National Park in Utah was named a National Monument.
- Died: Enrico Ferri, 73, Italian criminologist and socialist

== Saturday, April 13, 1929 ==
- The Young Commission handed Reichsbank President Hjalmar Schacht its proposal for the restructuring of reparations payments, which would have Germany pay $20–24 billion U.S. over 58 years. Schacht issued a statement that night saying the terms were unacceptable.

== Sunday, April 14, 1929 ==
- William Grover-Williams, representing the United Kingdom, won the first-ever Monaco Grand Prix.
- The first air mail delivery from India to the United Kingdom was completed at Croydon Aerodrome with the arrival of 15,000 letters.
- Born:
  - Gerry Anderson, British TV producer, director and writer, in Bloomsbury, London (d. 2012)
  - Chadli Bendjedid, the third President of Algeria; in Bouteldja (d. 2012)
  - Paavo Berglund, Finnish conductor and violinist, in Helsinki (d. 2012)

== Monday, April 15, 1929 ==
- Author J. M. Barrie donated the copyright fee of his Peter Pan works to the Great Ormond Street Hospital in London in perpetuity.
- On budget day in the United Kingdom a month ahead of a general election, Chancellor of the Exchequer Winston Churchill announced the abolition of the 325-year-old duty on tea, cutting its price by fourpence a pound. Overall taxes, however, were higher than the previous year.

== Tuesday, April 16, 1929 ==
- On Opening Day in major league baseball, Earl Averill made his major league baseball debut with the Cleveland Indians, going 1-for-4 with a home run to help defeat the Detroit Tigers 5–4 in 11 innings. The Indians also became the first ballclub to wear player numbers on the backs of their jerseys; the New York Yankees would have shared that distinction if their game hadn't been rained out that day.
- France rescinded its permission to allow English occultist Aleister Crowley to live there and gave him 24 hours to leave the country. Crowley had been living abroad since becoming unwelcome in England after being branded a traitor for writing articles supporting Germany during the war. "The expulsion order and the slanderous articles on my character do not worry me. Magick is the sole thing in life and lifts the soul above petty annoyances", Crowley declared from his sick bed.
- Born: Roy Hamilton, American singer, in Leesburg, Georgia (d. 1969)
- Died: Jack Fitzgerald, 56, British socialist

== Wednesday, April 17, 1929 ==
- Babe Ruth married his second wife Claire Merritt Hodgson at the Church of Saint Gregory the Great in New York City.

== Thursday, April 18, 1929 ==
- Broadway singer Helen Morgan was acquitted by a federal jury on a charge of violating liquor laws.
- Nearly 100 masked men destroyed the headquarters of the National Textile Workers Union in apparent retaliation for its support of the Loray Mill Strike.
- The Coleman Theatre along historic U.S. Route 66 opened in Miami, Oklahoma.

== Friday, April 19, 1929 ==
- Canadian Johnny Miles won the Boston Marathon.
- Rick Ferrell made his major league baseball debut with the St. Louis Browns, going 0-for-1 in a pinch-hitting appearance during a 5–4 loss to the Detroit Tigers.
- Died: John Baring, 2nd Baron Revelstoke, 65, British banker

== Saturday, April 20, 1929 ==
- The first all-Fascist parliament opened in Italy.
- Died: Prince Henry of Prussia, 66, German admiral and brother of Kaiser Wilhelm II

== Sunday, April 21, 1929 ==
- A Maddux Air Lines passenger plane collided in midair with a U.S. Army plane near San Diego, California. A total of six people were killed.

== Monday, April 22, 1929 ==
- In a speech to an Associated Press luncheon in New York, President Herbert Hoover declared that crime was the nation's most serious problem, warning of "the possibility that respect for law as law is fading from the sensibilities of our people", and that "life and property are relatively more unsafe than in any other civilized country in the world."
- The Japanese steamship Tokyo Kuni Maru sank after striking rocks off Cape Erimo in southern Hokkaido; two steamers arrived in time to rescue 97 survivors but over 100 others were believed drowned.
- Born: Michael Atiyah, British mathematician, in Hampstead, London (d. 2019)
- Died: Henry Lerolle, 80, French painter

== Tuesday, April 23, 1929 ==
- A group of 35 communists were arrested in Romania by police on allegations of a plot against the government.

== Wednesday, April 24, 1929 ==
- Elections for the Folketing, the parliament of Denmark, were held. The Social Democrats led by Thorvald Stauning remained the largest party.
- Canada agreed to arbitration with the United States in the I'm Alone sinking. The case was finally resolved in 1935 with a compensation settlement for the crew.
- Died: Caroline Rémy de Guebhard, 73, French feminist

== Thursday, April 25, 1929 ==
- Tornadoes killed 40 people in Georgia and South Carolina.
- The United States House of Representatives passed President Hoover's farm relief bill, 367 to 34.

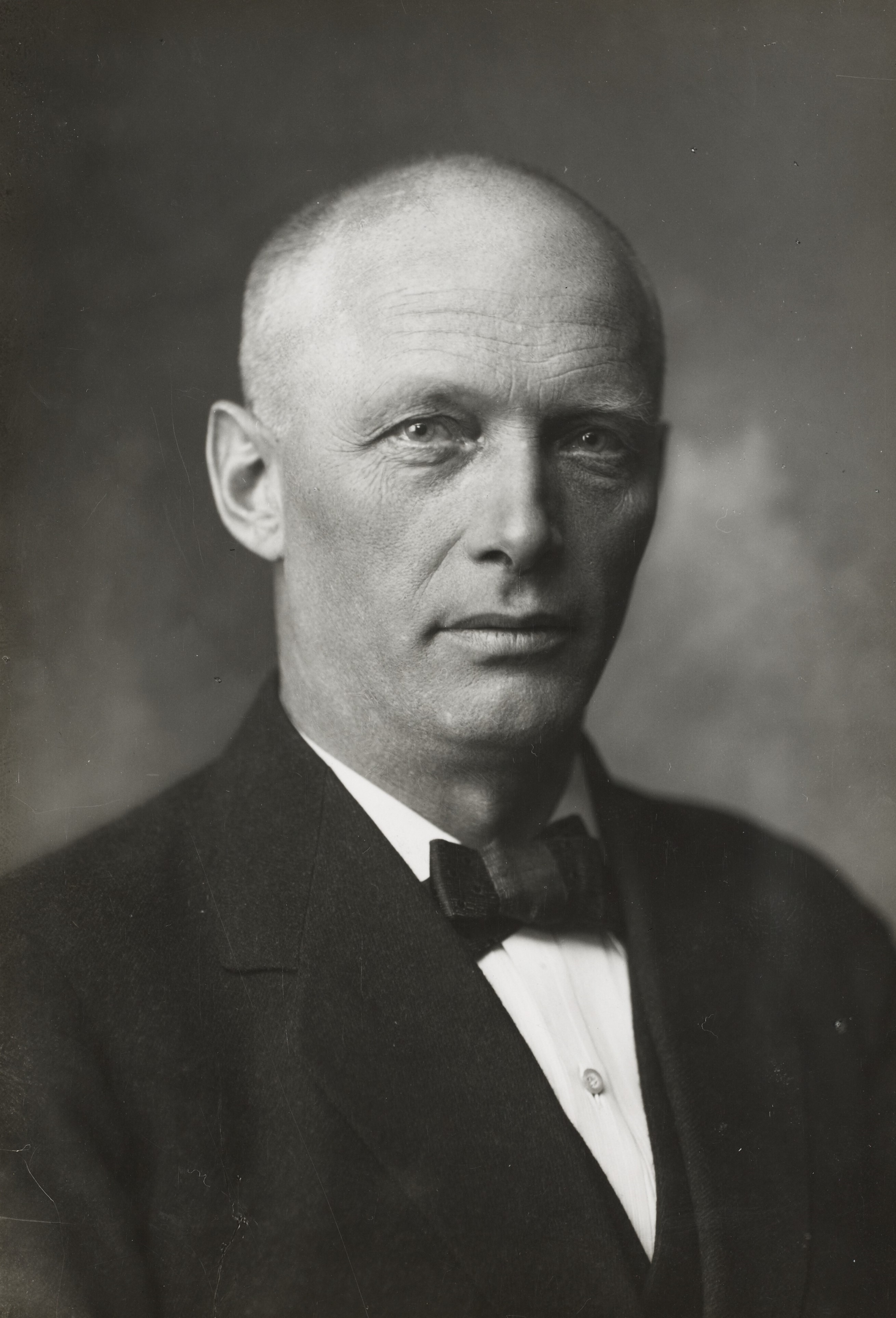
Madsen-Mygdal

- The cabinet of Danish Prime Minister Thomas Madsen-Mygdal resigned following defeat in the Folketing elections.
- Persia diplomatically recognized Iraq.

== Friday, April 26, 1929 ==
- The Royal Air Force completed the first non-stop flight from Britain to India. The flight was made in a Fairey Long-range Monoplane and took 50 hours 37 minutes.
- The musical film Innocents of Paris starring Maurice Chevalier was released.
- Born: Robert Sommer, environmental psychologist, in New York City (d. 2021)

== Saturday, April 27, 1929 ==
- Bolton Wanderers defeated Portsmouth 2–0 in the FA Cup Final at Wembley Stadium.

== Sunday, April 28, 1929 ==
- A crowd of 10,000 Belgian, British and French war veterans dedicated a monument in Steenstrate, Belgium on the fourteenth anniversary of the first poison gas attack in that Flanders village.
- The silent drama film Betrayal, starring Emil Jannings and Gary Cooper, premiered in New York City.

== Monday, April 29, 1929 ==
- King Victor Emmanuel III accepted the resignation of Giovanni Giuriati as Minister of Public Works and immediately gave the position to Benito Mussolini, who now held eight out of thirteen cabinet posts.
- At least 500 Mexican rebels surrendered in Sonora and more fled into the United States as the Cristero War wound down.
- Born: Mickey McDermott, baseball player, in Poughkeepsie, New York (d. 2003)

== Tuesday, April 30, 1929 ==
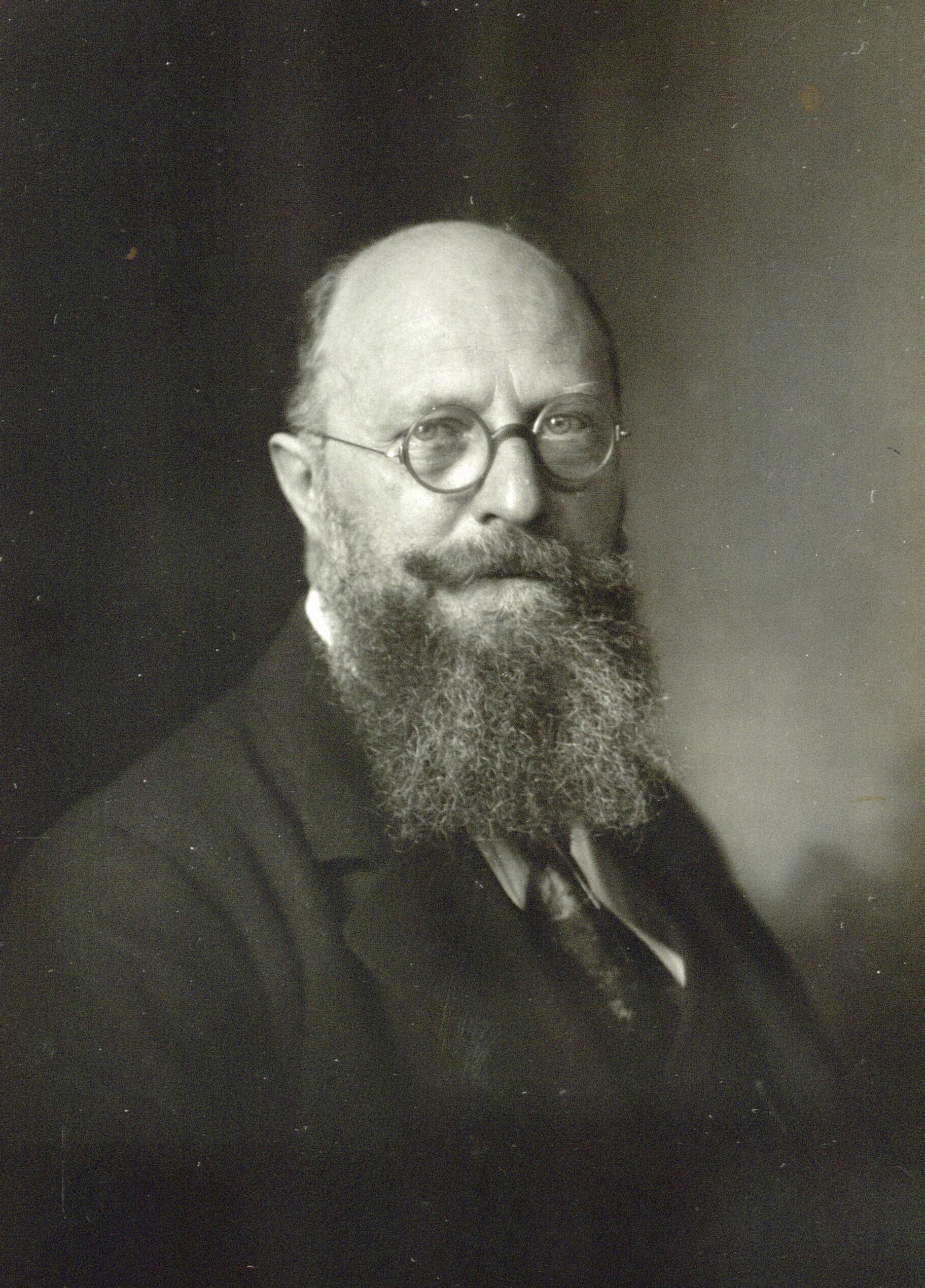
Stauning

- Thorvald Stauning became Prime Minister of Denmark for the second time.
- Born:
  - Will Holt, U.S. singer and songwriter, in Portland, Maine (d. 2015)
  - Fleming Mackell, Canadian hockey player, in Montreal (d. 2015)
