= USCGC Dexter (1925) =

History

United States
- Name: Dexter
- Namesake: Secretary of the Treasury Samuel Dexter (1761-1816)
- Builder: Defoe Boat and Motor Works, Bay City, Michigan
- Commissioned: 1925
- Decommissioned: 1936
- Fate: Transferred to United States Navy 1936

General characteristics
- Class & type: 100-foot patrol boat
- Displacement: 210 tons
- Length: 99 ft 8 in (30.38 m)
- Beam: 23 ft 0 in (7.01 m)
- Draft: 4 ft 6 in (1.37 m)
- Installed power: 300 bhp (0.22 MW)
- Propulsion: Two Grey Marine diesel engines; twin propellers
- Speed: 12 knots maximum
- Complement: 15 (1 warrant officer, 14 enlisted personnel)
- Armament: 1 x 3-inch (76.2-millimeter) 23-caliber gun

USCGC Dexter, was a steel-hulled patrol boat of the United States Coast Guard in commission from 1925 to 1936. She was the third ship of the United States Revenue Cutter Service and United States Coast Guard to bear the name.

Dexter was built by the Defoe Boat and Motor Works at Bay City, Michigan. She was commissioned into the Coast Guard in 1925.

Dexter was stationed at Boston, Massachusetts, from 1925 until 1927. She was then transferred to Pascagoula, Mississippi late in 1927. By 1935 she had been transferred to Buffalo, New York.

Dexter was decommissioned in 1936. She was then transferred to the United States Navy.

On June 19, 2010 Dexter (known as Buccaneer) was sunk in Lake Michigan as an artificial reef.

Dexter is also a ship of some historical significance. During her tenure as a revenue cutter she sank the Canadian rum running sloop I'm Alone in the Gulf of Mexico, in 1929. While I'm Alone had allegedly been sighted within U.S. territorial waters, the actual sinking occurred in international waters, 200 miles out in the Gulf of Mexico. One crew member from the sloop was killed during the sinking, he was a French national. This created quite an international incident involving Canada, Britain and France. The resulting lawsuit was settled in 1936.

After being stricken from the U.S. Coast Guard rolls in 1936, the Dexter was turned over to the U.S. Navy, in Buffalo New York, and renamed YP-63. She saw action during World War II patrolling in the Caribbean, based out of Trinidad, on the Atlantic Sea Frontier. She is officially cited in the "Chronology of the U.S. Navy in World War II". On June 16, 1942, YP-63 (ex-USCGC Dexter) and the coastal yacht Opal rescued 91 survivors from three successive merchant ships sunk by the German U boats: U-126, U-161 and U-502.

After the war she was acquired by various private interests. She saw service as a recreational fishing vessel off Boston, an oil drilling services vessel off Louisiana and finally ended up in Chicago, as a pirate themed party boat. It is ironic that this vessel, originally created to enforce prohibition, became the MV Buccaneer, dedicated to providing quantities of booze to her willing customers.

For three years Buccaneer was at a marina on the Little Calumet River being prepared for sinking in Lake Michigan as a dive attraction. She was finally sunk in Lake Michigan on June 18, 2010. She now rests as an artificial reef in 74 ft. of water about eight miles off the coast of Chicago.
