= December 1928 =

Month of 1928

<<	December 1928					>>
Su	Mo	Tu	We	Th	Fr	Sa
						1
2	3	4	5	6	7	8
9	10	11	12	13	14	15
16	17	18	19	20	21	22
23	24	25	26	27	28	29
30	31

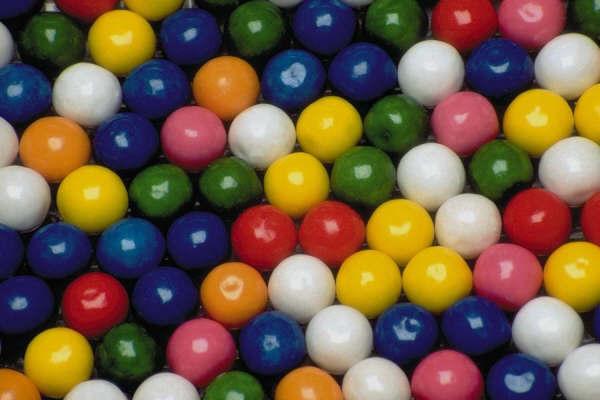
December 26, 1928: Novelty "bubble gum" goes on sale for first time

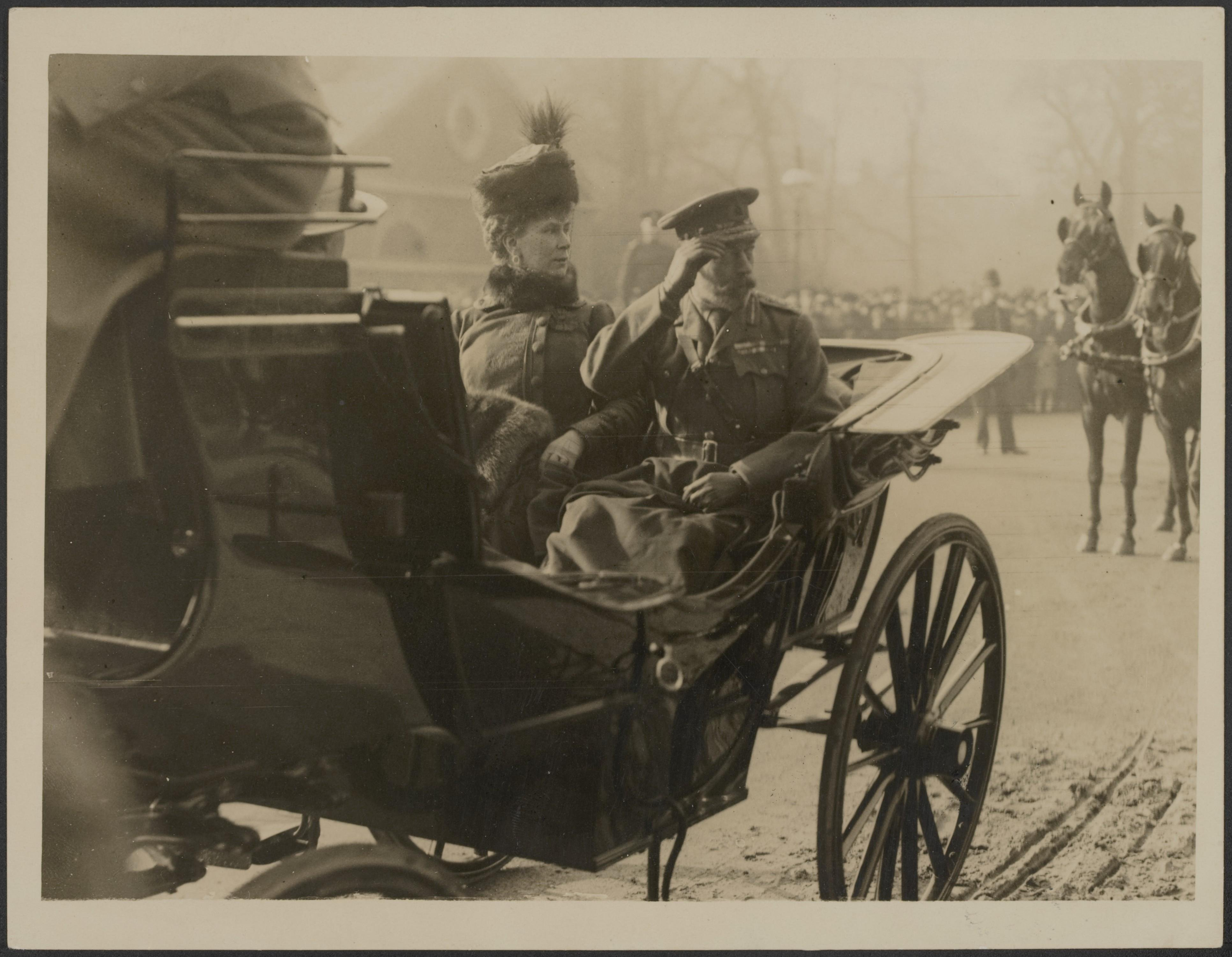
December 4, 1928: King George V seriously ill, Queen Mary chosen to lead six-person council during his disability

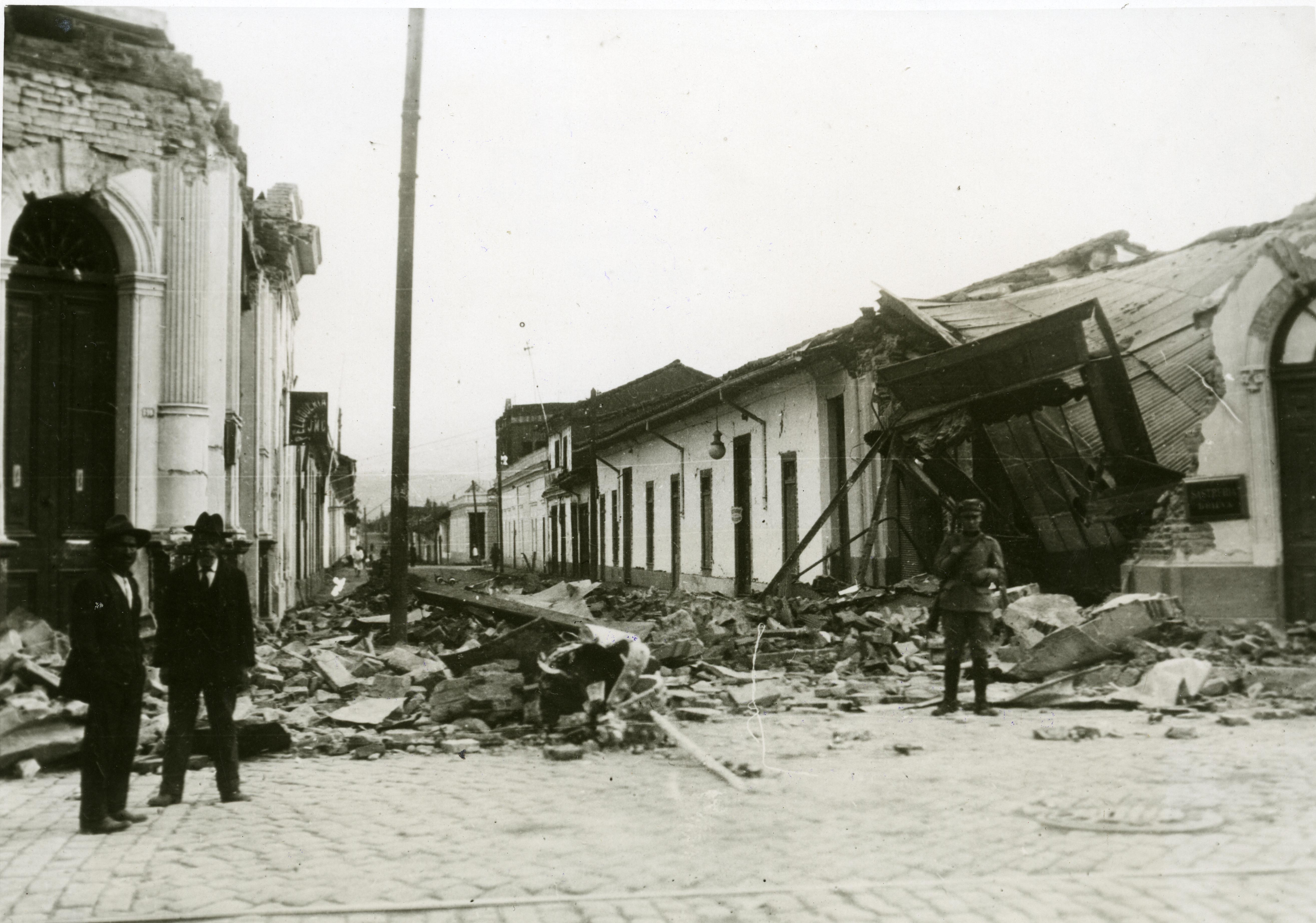
December 1, 1928: Earthquake in Chile kills 279 people

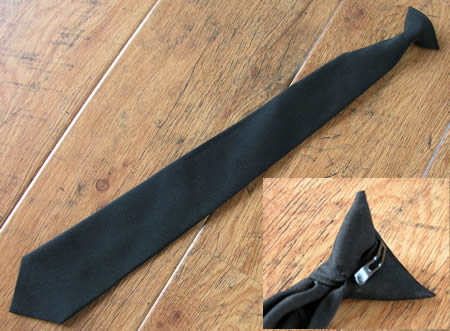
December 13, 1928: "Clip-On" tie introduced

The following events occurred in December 1928:

== Saturday, December 1, 1928 ==
- The Talca earthquake, a 7.9 magnitude tremor, struck Chile, killing 279 people.
- The Hamilton Tigers won the 16th Grey Cup of Canadian football with a 30–0 win over the Regina Roughriders.
- President-elect Herbert Hoover visited Ecuador.
- Estelle Manville, daughter of American industrialist Hiram Manville, married Count Folke Bernadotte of Sweden, the nephew of King Gustav V, in a lavish $750,000 ceremony in Pleasantville, New York.
- Died:
  - Arthur Gore, 60, British tennis player
  - José Eustasio Rivera, 40, Colombian writer

== Sunday, December 2, 1928 ==
- Prince Henry, Duke of Gloucester joined his brother Edward in abandoning an African trip to rush to the bedside of the ailing King.
- The Frank Lloyd-directed sound film Adoration starring Billie Dove was released.

== Monday, December 3, 1928 ==
- The physicians of George V issued an early morning bulletin stating that oxygen had been administered to the King during the night.
- The Firestone Hour, a classical music program, was first broadcast on the NBC Radio network.

== Tuesday, December 4, 1928 ==
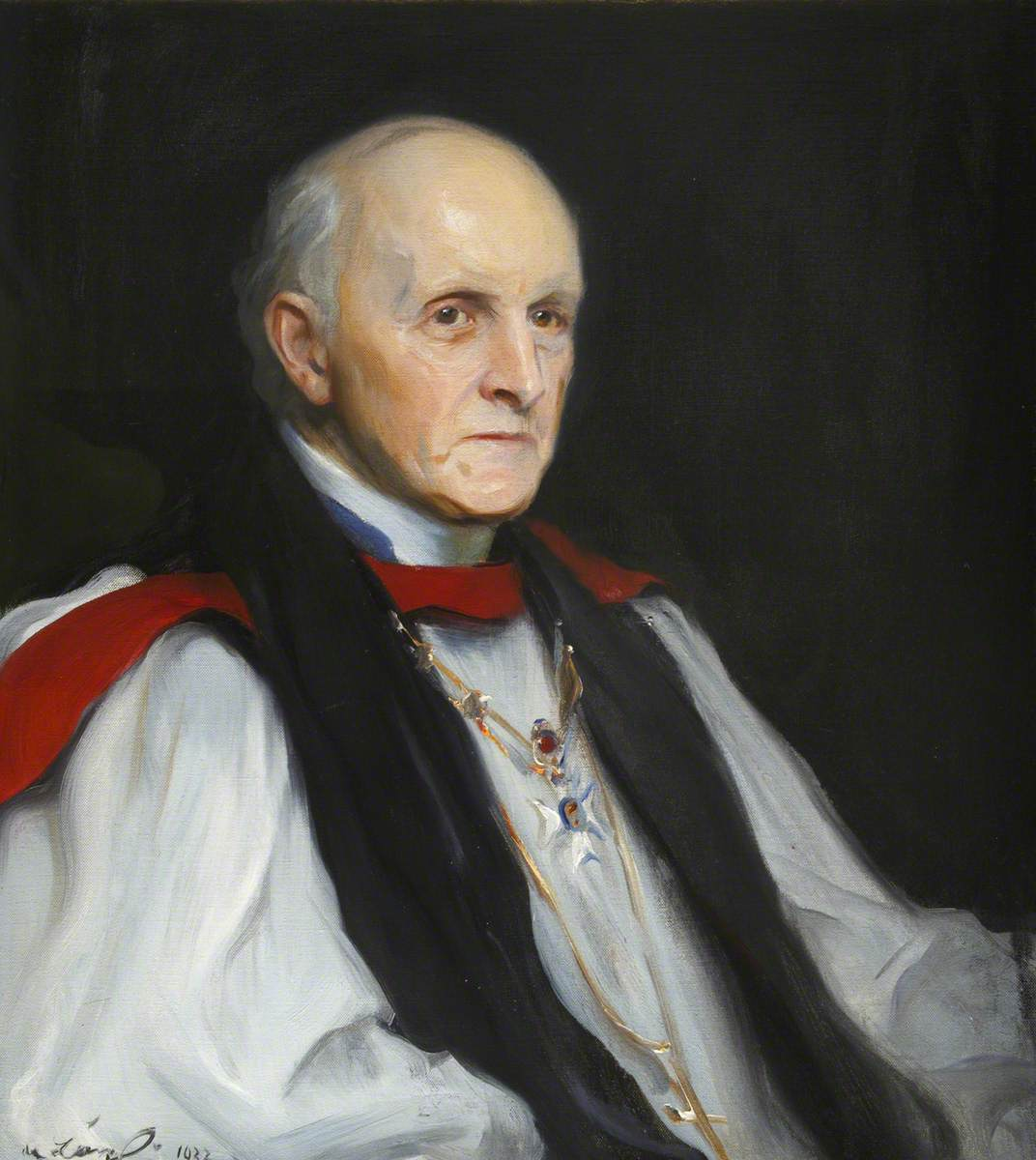
Archbishop Lang

- Prime Minister Stanley Baldwin announced in the House of Commons that a six-person council headed by Queen Mary had been appointed to handle George V's duties.
- U.S. President Calvin Coolidge delivered his sixth and final State of the Union message to Congress. As with all his previous messages except the first, it was a written rather than oral statement. "The country can regard the present with satisfaction and anticipate the future with optimism", the message read. "The country is in the midst of an era of prosperity more extensive and of peace more permanent than it has ever before experienced. But, having reached this position, we should not fail to comprehend that it can easily be lost."
- Cosmo Lang was installed as the new Archbishop of Canterbury.
- The musical comedy Whoopee! by Walter Donaldson and Gus Kahn premiered at the New Amsterdam Theatre on Broadway.

== Wednesday, December 5, 1928 ==
- US Presidential-electee Herbert Hoover visited Peru.
- England won the 1st Test cricket match against Australia by a record 675 runs.

== Thursday, December 6, 1928 ==
- The Banana massacre occurred at Colombia in Ciénaga when the army fired on striking workers for the United Fruit Company, killing at least 47 people.
- The government of New Zealand Prime Minister Gordon Coates fell on a motion of no confidence.
- Paraguayan and Bolivian forces clashed in the disputed Gran Chaco region.

== Friday, December 7, 1928 ==
- Fascist Italy passed a decree putting an aristocrat's estate into the hands of a special agricultural board. The aristocrat had failed to comply with a government demand that estate holders must cultivate their lands extensively to help the country increase its farming production.
- Born: Noam Chomsky, linguist, philosopher and activist, in Philadelphia

== Saturday, December 8, 1928 ==
- After several days of losses, the crashing New York Stock Exchange bottomed out with a mass selling spree. Between Wednesday and Saturday the Dow Jones Industrial Average lost 33 points and the six market leaders alone lost over $800 million of their value on paper. Big single-day losses on Saturday included Radio Corporation of America (72 points), Wright Aeronautical (26 points), Montgomery Ward (24 points) and Kolster Radio (17 points).
- The U.S. District Court for the Western District of New York ruled that making wine at home, or selling concentrated grapes with instructions for making wine from them at home, was permitted under Section 29 of the Volstead Act.

== Sunday, December 9, 1928 ==
- Italy passed a new law giving the Grand Council of Fascism the right to approve the succession to the throne, as well as the monarch's powers. King Victor Emmanuel III was opposed to the law, but did little except grumble.
- The dramatic play Journey's End by R. C. Sherriff was first performed at the Apollo Theatre in London.
- The partly talking romantic drama film The Barker, starring Milton Sills and Dorothy Mackaill, was released.
- Born:
  - Dick Van Patten, American actor, in Kew Gardens, New York (d. 2015)
  - Joe DeMaestri, U.S. baseball player, in San Francisco, California (d. 2016)

== Monday, December 10, 1928 ==
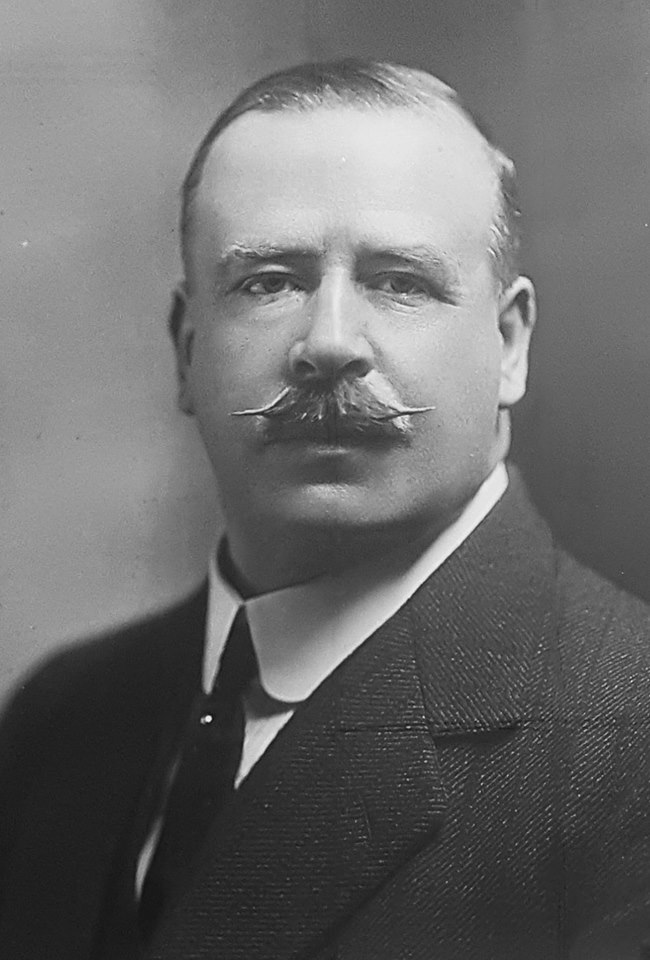
Prime Minister Ward

- The 1928 Nobel Prizes were awarded. The recipients were Owen Richardson of the United Kingdom for Physics, Adolf Windhaus of Germany (Chemistry), Charles Nicolle of France (Medicine) and Sigrid Undset of Norway (Literature). The Peace Prize was not awarded.
- Montreal General Hospital was badly damaged in a fire.
- Herbert Hoover visited Chile.
- Joseph Ward became the Prime Minister of New Zealand for the second time.
- The British ocean liner RMS Celtic ran aground on the Cow and Calf Rocks, off Cobh, County Cork, Ireland. Subsequent attempts to free the ship failed so it was abandoned as a total loss.
- Died: Charles Rennie Mackintosh, 60, Scottish architect

== Tuesday, December 11, 1928 ==
- Edward, Prince of Wales reached the bedside of ailing George V, whose condition remained grave.
- During a National League meeting, President John Heydler proposed that baseball have a designated hitter rule. John McGraw approved of the idea, but it had little support otherwise, as run scoring was already at high levels at the time.
- Died: Lewis Howard Latimer, 80, African-American inventor

== Wednesday, December 12, 1928 ==
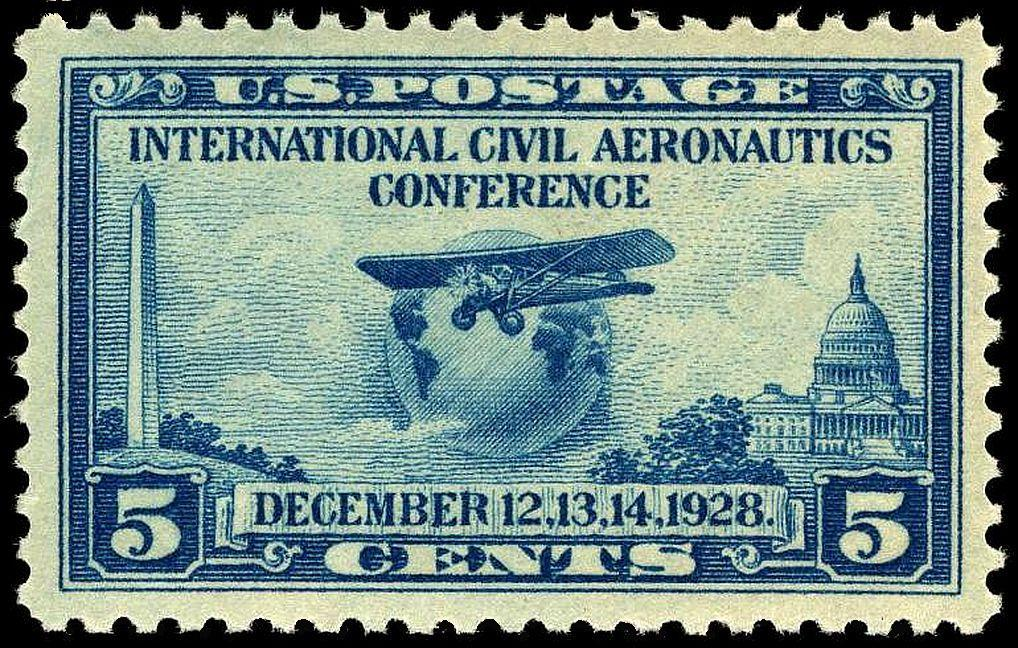
Stamp commemorating the International Civil Aeronautics Conference, December 12–14, 1928

- Two operations were performed on George V to drain his right lung.
- Elections were held for the Romanian Chamber of Deputies; an alliance led by the National Peasants' Party won by a landslide, dealing a crushing defeat to Vintilă Brătianu's National Liberal Party.
- President Calvin Coolidge welcomed representatives of 34 nations at the opening of the International Civil Aeronautics Conference in Washington, D.C. The three-day gathering commemorated the 25th anniversary of the first flight, and was the first significant event to recognize the achievement of the Wright brothers. Orville Wright was honored, and escorted Charles Lindbergh to the platform to receive the Harmon Trophy.

== Thursday, December 13, 1928 ==
- The clip-on tie was invented.
- Medical authorities gave George V a good chance for recovery, the two operations having appeared to have saved his life.
- George Gershwin's An American in Paris was first performed in Carnegie Hall.
- Herbert Hoover visited Argentina, arriving in Buenos Aires by train.

== Friday, December 14, 1928 ==
- The U.S. Senate passed the Boulder Dam Bill, 64 to 11.
- Bolivian soldiers seized Fort Boquerón from Paraguay in the disputed Gran Chaco region.
- Died: Theodore Roberts, 67, American actor

== Saturday, December 15, 1928 ==
- Bolivia called up its reserves and bombed Bahia Negra from the air, but none of the bombs dropped actually exploded.
- A closing session at the League of Nations turned into a shouting match between German Foreign Minister Gustav Stresemann and his Polish counterpart August Zaleski, over Poland's treatment of German minorities in Polish Upper Silesia.
- Rotary International was banned in Fascist Italy.
- Born: Friedensreich Hundertwasser, artist and architect, in Vienna, Austria (d. 2000)

== Sunday, December 16, 1928 ==
- Paraguay issued orders to mobilize its army.
- Herbert Hoover arrived in Uruguay, sailing into Montevideo at sunset.
- Born:
  - Philip K. Dick, writer and philosopher, in Chicago (d. 1982)
  - Friedrich Wilhelm Schnitzler, German landowner, politician (CDU), manager and business man, in Ohnastetten (d.2011)
- Died: Elinor Wylie, 43, American poet and novelist

== Monday, December 17, 1928 ==
- Aristide Briand of the council of the League of Nations said he would immediately convoke a special council session in Paris if either Bolivia or Paraguay formally declared war.
- Paraguay accepted an offer of mediation from the Pan-American Congress.
- Orville Wright was honored in Kitty Hawk, North Carolina, on the twenty-fifth anniversary of the Wright brothers' historic flight, as a granite boulder was unveiled to mark the spot of the flight and the cornerstone of a government memorial was laid. Secretary of War Dwight F. Davis, Governor Angus Wilton McLean, National Aeronautic Association President Hiram Bingham and aviator Amelia Earhart were all in attendance.
- Born: George Lindsey, actor, in Fairfield, Alabama (d. 2012)
- Died: Eglantyne Jebb, 52, British social reformer and founder of Save the Children

== Tuesday, December 18, 1928 ==
- Bolivia accepted mediation in the conflict with Paraguay.
- Born: Sputnik Monroe, professional wrestler, in Dodge City, Kansas (d. 2006)

== Wednesday, December 19, 1928 ==
- The Comintern, in an open letter to the Communist Party of Germany, called for the expulsion of Heinrich Brandler and forbade conciliation with the Right Opposition.
- Born: Eve Bunting, writer, in Maghera, Northern Ireland (d. 2023)

== Thursday, December 20, 1928 ==
- Sir Hubert Wilkins and Carl Ben Eielson mapped out 40 miles of previously uncharted territory in Antarctica from the air during a 10-hour flight. Casey Glacier, Stefansson Strait, Hearst Island, Mobiloil Inlet, Scripps Heights, Cape Northrop, Wilkins Coast and Eielson Peninsula were among the many topographical features discovered and named. The flyers also dropped a territorial claim on behalf of the British government.
- Born: Motilal Vora, Indian politician, Chief Minister of Madhya Pradesh (1985–1988; 1989) (d. 2020)

== Friday, December 21, 1928 ==
- U.S. President Calvin Coolidge signed the Boulder Dam Bill into law, pending ratification by the states involved.
- Herbert Hoover visited Rio de Janeiro, Brazil, the final stop of his Latin American goodwill tour.

== Saturday, December 22, 1928 ==
- Former U.S. Representative John W. Langley of Kentucky was granted a full presidential pardon by Calvin Coolidge for illegally allowing alcohol to be transported.
- Died: Michael F. Collins, 74, American newspaper publisher and politician

== Sunday, December 23, 1928 ==
- Herbert Hoover departed Rio de Janeiro, ending his goodwill tour of Latin America.
- In Chattanooga, Tennessee, 4 were killed when a plane bound for Atlanta crashed into a dwelling two minutes after takeoff. A fifth passenger survived.

== Monday, December 24, 1928 ==
- Fascist Italy passed a law for the draining of the Pontine Marshes.
- The Craig Theatre opened in New York City.
- The Byrd Theatre opened in Richmond, Virginia.
- The first broadcast Carols From Kings on BBC National Programme

== Tuesday, December 25, 1928 ==
- The Western talking film In Old Arizona, starring Warner Baxter, premiered at the Fox West Coast Criterion Theatre in Los Angeles. It was the first talkie to be filmed outdoors.
- Born:
  - Irish McCalla, actress and artist, in Pawnee City, Nebraska (d. 2002)
  - Dick Miller, character actor, in the Bronx (d. 2019)
- Died: Fred Thomson, 38, American silent film actor, died from tetanus

== Wednesday, December 26, 1928 ==
- Dubble Bubble Gum, the first brand of chewing gum that allowed for blowing bubbles cleanly, was first sold by the Fleer Chewing Gum Company of Philadelphia under the brand name "Dubble Bubble". The invention of Walter E. Diemer, an accountant for the Fleer candy company, bubble gum differed from previous candies in that it could not only expand with air, but was easy to remove from the skin once popped.

== Thursday, December 27, 1928 ==
- Saboteurs derailed a train on the Santa Fe Railway at Hesperia, California. Two were injured but there were no fatalities.
- Benito Mussolini notified all ministers and public officials not to call his office on January 1 with Happy New Year wishes, saying it wasted valuable time which could be better spent working.

== Friday, December 28, 1928 ==
- Anton Korošec resigned as Prime Minister of Yugoslavia.
- Born: Jack Choquette, race car driver, in Montclair, New Jersey (d. 2013)

== Saturday, December 29, 1928 ==
- A special commission appointed by Mussolini to study Italian elementary school textbooks announced that there was not a single geography or history book fit for Italian schools. The commission ordered a new state-approved textbook that would reappraise Italian history and its prominent figures from the years before the Fascist regime.
- Born: Bernard Cribbins, British actor and singer, in Oldham (d. 2022)

== Sunday, December 30, 1928 ==
- Scottish anatomist and anthropologist Sir Arthur Keith said that 45 to 50 was the age that humans were naturally meant to live to. "Civilization, acting as the world's hothouse, gradually extended this age to between 65 and 75", he explained. "Nowadays some even desire it to be prolonged over the century mark. I think it is one of the most foolish of things for man to want such a long life." Keith said it was "selfish" for older generations to "hang on too long" and block younger generations from getting their chance in life, and that it would be in the world's best interests to restrict human life to an age at which each human would produce at maximum ability.
- Balaídos Municipal Stadium opened in Vigo, Spain.
- Born: Bo Diddley, R&B musician, in McComb, Mississippi (d. 2008)
- Died: Lutz Wahl, 59, American Major General

== Monday, December 31, 1928 ==
- French Prime Minister Raymond Poincaré tried to resign, but his cabinet would not let him, rising one by one to tell him that doing so would cause national disaster.
- Born: Siné, political cartoonist, in Paris, France (d. 2016)
