= January 1929 =

Month of 1929

<<	January 1929					>>
Su	Mo	Tu	We	Th	Fr	Sa
		1	2	3	4	5
6	7	8	9	10	11	12
13	14	15	16	17	18	19
20	21	22	23	24	25	26
27	28	29	30	31

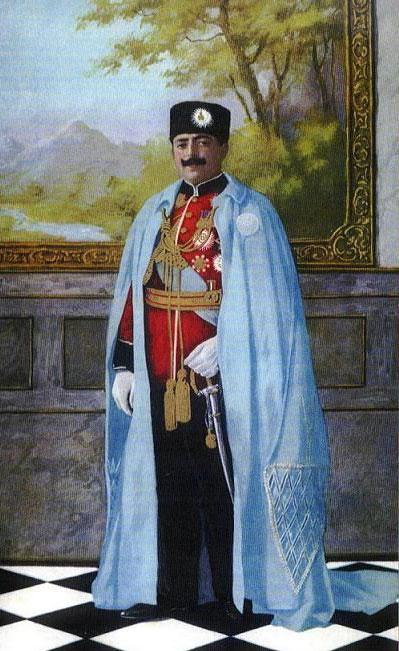
January 14, 1929: King Amanullah of Afghanistan forced to flee rebels.

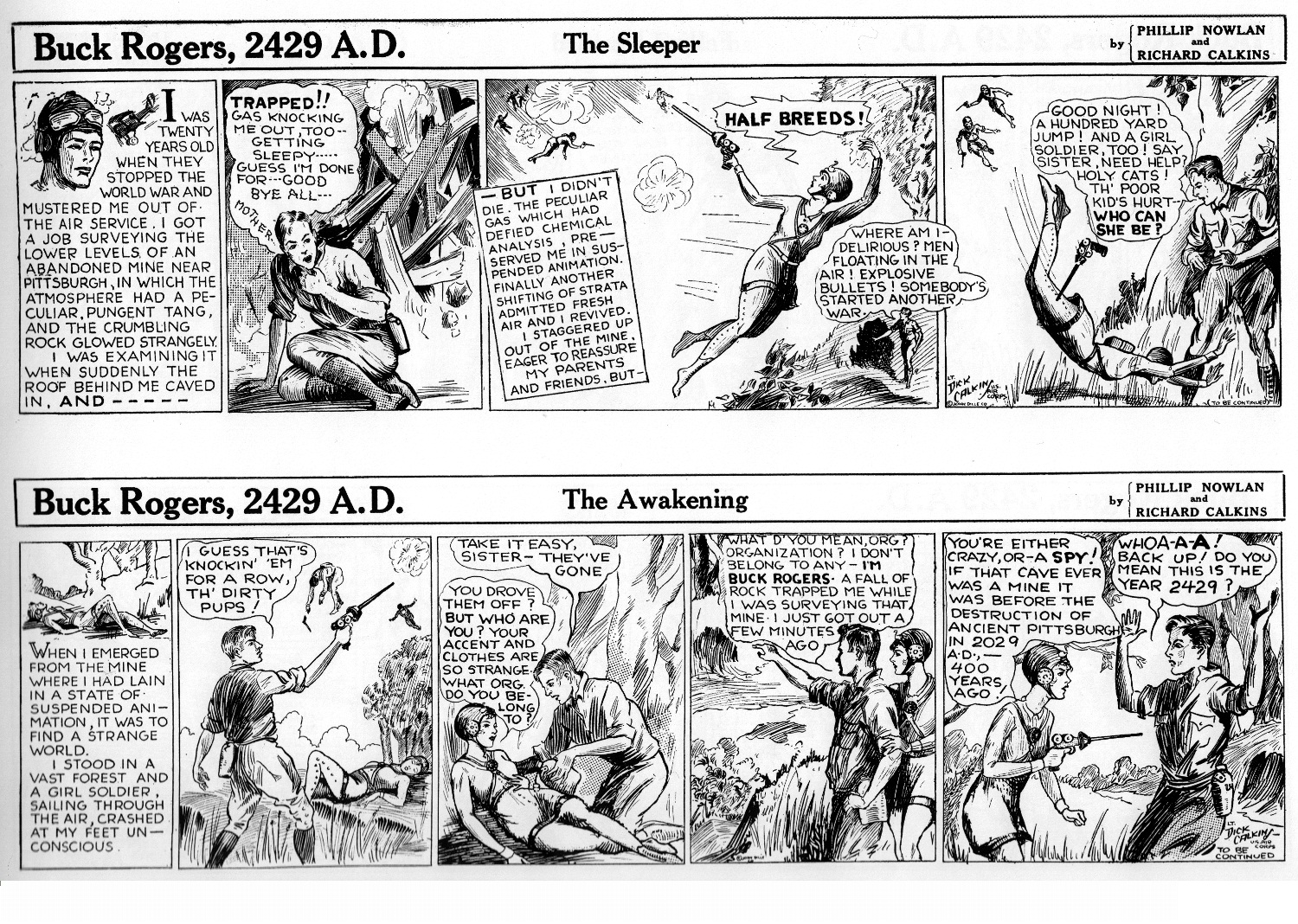
January 7, 1929: "Buck Rogers, 2429 A.D." comic strip envisions the world 500 years later

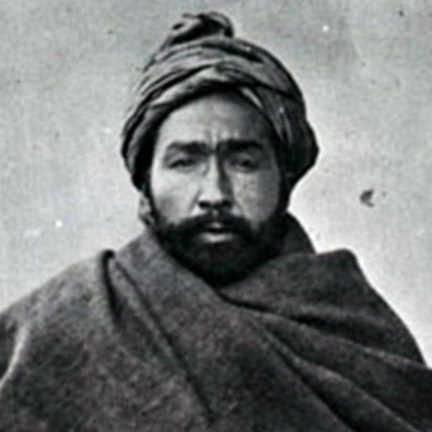
January 17, 1929: Rebel Islamic leader Habibullah Kalakani invades Kabul, proclaims himself as new King of Afghanistan

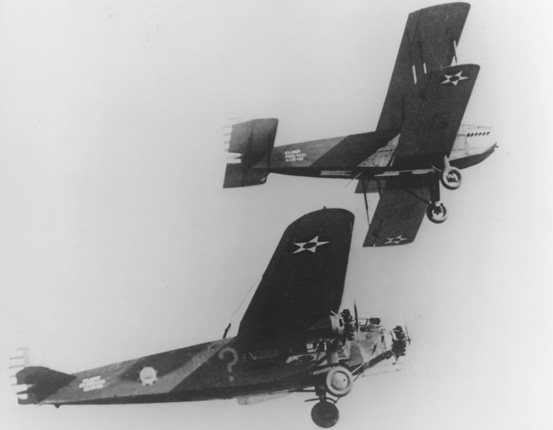
January 7, 1929: U.S. Army Air Force plane Question Mark sets new record by staying aloft almost a week with aerial refueling.

The following events occurred in January 1929:

== Tuesday, January 1, 1929 ==
- In the 15th Rose Bowl, the Georgia Tech Yellow Jackets defeated the California Golden Bears 8–7. The game featured one of the biggest blunders in college football history when Roy Riegels of the Golden Bears picked up a fumble and ran the wrong way, leading to a Yellow Jackets two-point safety that ultimately provided the margin of victory.
- German President Paul von Hindenburg and Chancellor Hermann Müller told a New Year's Day reception of diplomatic representatives that the German people wanted the occupation of the Rhineland to end. Hindenburg said that the German people were "very bitter because a great part of their country still lacks the liberty which we claim by divine and human right", while Müller said that strained international relations remaining over the war could only end once the "foreign yoke" of occupation had been removed.
- Born:
  - Joseph Lombardo, mafioso, in Italy (d. 2019)
  - Haruo Nakajima, Japanese actor, in Yamagata Prefecture (d. 2017)
  - Vikki Dougan, American actress and model
- Died: Mustafa Necati, Turkish statesman (b. 1894)

== Wednesday, January 2, 1929 ==
- Yugoslavian Prime Minister Anton Korošec informed King Alexander of his resignation, explaining that he could not accept the demands of the Peasant-Democratic coalition which was campaigning for Croatian autonomy.
- Died: Denny Lyons, 62, American baseball player

== Thursday, January 3, 1929 ==
- Bolivia and Paraguay averted war over the disputed Chaco region by signing an arbitration treaty.
- Born:
  - Sergio Leone, Italian filmmaker, in Rome (d. 1989)
  - Ernst Mahle, Brazilian composer and conductor, in Stuttgart, Germany (d. 2025)
  - Gordon Moore, U.S. computing entrepreneur and philanthropist; in San Francisco (d. 2023)

== Friday, January 4, 1929 ==
- A merger between the Victor Talking Machine Company and RCA was officially approved. One reason why RCA head David Sarnoff wanted Victor was for its production plant in Camden, New Jersey, which could manufacture equipment for the booming medium of sound film. The move helped establish Sarnoff's RKO Pictures as a major new film company.
- The Daily Mail announced that American industrialist and Secretary of the Treasury Andrew W. Mellon had purchased the Niccolini-Cowper Madonna by the Italian Renaissance artist Raphael for about $1 million, a new record at the time for the most ever paid for a single painting.

== Saturday, January 5, 1929 ==
- The monarchy of Yugoslavia issued a statement declaring that the current governmental crisis could not be resolved with a parliamentary regime.
- Pan-American delegates signed the General Act of Inter-American Arbitration in Washington, D.C.. The agreement was a sort of Kellogg-Briand Pact for the Western Hemisphere.
- Born: Wilbert Harrison, musician, in Charlotte, North Carolina (d. 1994)
- Died:
  - Marc McDermott, 47, Australian-American actor
  - Grand Duke Nicholas Nikolaevich, 72, Russian general

== Sunday, January 6, 1929 ==
- King Alexander of Yugoslavia suspended the 1921 constitution and introduced a dictatorship.
- Heinrich Himmler became Reichsführer-SS.
- Died: Tex Rickard, 59, American boxing promoter

== Monday, January 7, 1929 ==
- King Amānullāh Khān of Afghanistan banned European styles of dress and restored veils for women.
- Petar Živković became Prime Minister of Yugoslavia as King Alexander named a new cabinet of his own choosing.
- The U.S. aircraft Question Mark ("?") completed 150 hours, 40 minutes and 15 seconds of sustained flight, a new endurance record more than doubling the old mark. The plane relied on aerial refueling to stay in the air for six days over Southern California.
- Tarzan of the Apes, a newspaper comic strip adaptation of the Edgar Rice Burroughs character of Tarzan, was first published.
- The newspaper comic strip Buck Rogers in the 25th Century A.D. premiered.
- Born: Terry Moore, American actress, in Glendale, California
- Died: Henry Arthur Jones, 77, English dramatist

== Tuesday, January 8, 1929 ==
- King Alexander of Yugoslavia issued a series of royal decrees, putting all the nation's legal courts under direct control of the government and cutting off revenues to Yugoslavian political ministers.
- Born: Saeed Jaffrey, British actor, in Malerkotla, British India (d. 2015)
- Died:
  - Wallace Eddinger, 47, American stage actor
  - Pasqualino Lolordo, Chicago mobster, was murdered

== Wednesday, January 9, 1929 ==
- The right to public assembly was removed in Yugoslavia.
- Born: Brian Friel, Irish dramatist, in Killyclogher, Northern Ireland (d. 2015)

== Thursday, January 10, 1929 ==
- In Belgium, Hergé's character Tintin first appeared in the children's newspaper supplement Le Petit Vingtième, as the serialized adventure Tintin in the Land of the Soviets ran its first installment.
- The Elmer Rice play Street Scene opened at the Playhouse Theatre in New York City.

== Friday, January 11, 1929 ==
- The Soviet Union reduced its working day to seven hours.
- Babe Ruth's estranged wife Helen died in a house fire in Watertown, Massachusetts. She had been living for several years with a dentist and was thought by neighbours to have been his wife.
- Born: Don Mossi, American baseball player, in St. Helena, California (d. 2019)

== Saturday, January 12, 1929 ==
- The romantic adventure film The Rescue, starring Ronald Colman and Lili Damita, was released.
- Born: Alasdair MacIntyre, Scottish philosopher, in Glasgow (d. 2025)

== Sunday, January 13, 1929 ==
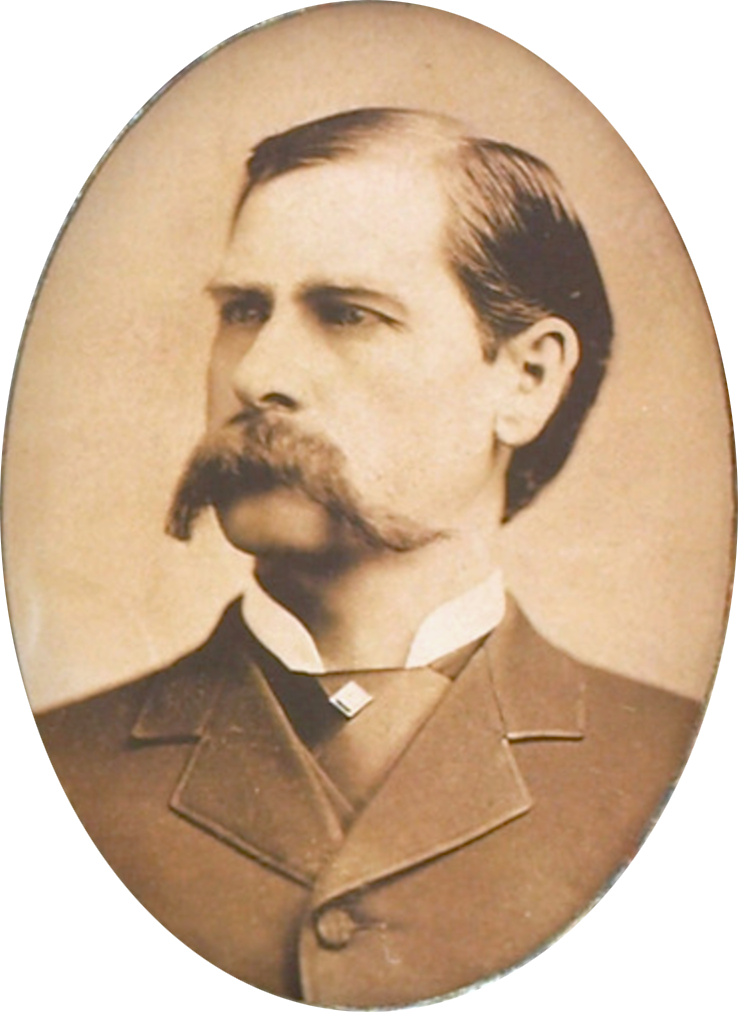
Wyatt Earp

- Yugoslavia banned foreign newspapers that criticized the new dictatorship.
- Died: Wyatt Earp, 80, American gambler, deputy sheriff and deputy town marshal

== Monday, January 14, 1929 ==
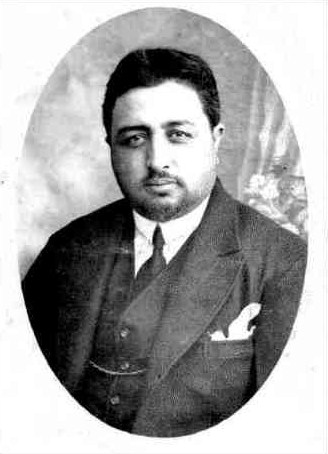
King of Afghanistan for 3 days

- Amānullāh Khān of Afghanistan, facing revolt, abdicated and left the throne to his brother Inayatullah Khan. King Inayatullah reigned for only three days before being overthrown by rebels.
- The U.S. Supreme Court decided Wisconsin v. Illinois, ruling that one U.S. state can legally compel another state to take action for the public good.

== Tuesday, January 15, 1929 ==
- The U.S. Senate ratified the Kellogg-Briand Pact.
- Born: Martin Luther King Jr., African-American civil rights leader; in Atlanta (d. 1968)
- Died: William Boyd Dawkins, 91, British geologist and archaeologist

== Wednesday, January 16, 1929 ==
- Nikolai Bukharin resigned as head of the Communist International after disagreements with Joseph Stalin.
- General of the Salvation Army Bramwell Booth was adjudicated as unfit to continue by a 55 to 8 vote of the organization's High Command.

== Thursday, January 17, 1929 ==
- Civil war in Afghanistan, rebels led by Habibullāh Kalakāni captured Kabul and proclaimed Kalakāni the new ruler.
- Fifty people were killed when a 6.7-magnitude earthquake struck Anzoátegui, Venezuela.
- The comic strip character Popeye first appeared in the daily King Features comic strip Thimble Theatre.
- Born:
  - Jacques Plante, Canadian ice hockey goaltender known for introducing the face mask in NHL games; in Notre-Dame-du-Mont-Carmel, Quebec (d. 1986);
  - Elaine Roth, American baseball player in the AAGPBL; in Michigan City, Indiana (d. 2007)
  - Tan Boon Teik former Attorney-General of Singapore, in Penang, Straits Settlements (d. 2012)

== Friday, January 18, 1929 ==
- British airplanes rescued Inayatullah Khan, ousted as King of Afghanistan after only three days, from Kabul and brought him to Kandahar where he rejoined his brother in exile.

== Saturday, January 19, 1929 ==
- The Hawes-Cooper Act was passed in the United States, making prison-made goods subject to the laws of the state importing them. The bill was an attempt to curtail the use of prison labor that could make goods more cheaply than free market labor.

== Sunday, January 20, 1929 ==
- Political parties with the word "Croat", "Croatia" or "Croatian" in their name, including the Croatian Popular Party, were ordered dissolved in Yugoslavia.
- Born: Arte Johnson, American comedian and actor; in Benton Harbor, Michigan (d. 2019)

== Monday, January 21, 1929 ==
- Oklahoma Governor Henry S. Johnston was suspended from office by the state senate after five articles of impeachment were brought against him. Lieutenant Governor William J. Holloway became acting governor.
- Italian police destroyed 2,000 fake American passports in the government's fight against emigrant bootlegging.

== Tuesday, January 22, 1929 ==
- Two thousand monarchists assembled in Berlin's Krieger-Vereinshaus to celebrate the upcoming 70th birthday of deposed Kaiser Wilhelm II and hail Crown Prince Wilhelm as the "heir to the imperial crown". The former crown prince did not appear, but his son Wilhelm of Prussia sat in the front row and frequently rose to bow.
- The D. W. Griffith-directed, partly talking film Lady of the Pavements was released.
- Born: Ron Richards, English record producer, manager and promoter, in London (d. 2009)
- Died: Adolph Brodsky, 77, Russian violinist

== Wednesday, January 23, 1929 ==
- A mistake during an aerial bombing practice in Peshawar inadvertently killed 14 members of the Poona Horse cavalry regiment in what is now called "friendly fire".
- The drama film The Bellamy Trial was released.
- Born:
  - John Polanyi, Hungarian-Canadian chemist and Nobel laureate, in Berlin
  - Patriarch Filaret, former Patriarch of the Ukrainian Orthodox Church – Kiev Patriarchate, in Donetsk, Ukrainian SSR (d. 2026)
- Died: Henry Killilea, 65, co-founder of baseball's American League

== Thursday, January 24, 1929 ==
- The Seven Dials Mystery by Agatha Christie was published.
- Died: Wilfred Baddeley, 57, English tennis player

== Friday, January 25, 1929 ==
- Fascist Italy announced an extensive new shipbuilding program to bring the country's naval strength back to parity with other powers, particularly France.
- Born: Benny Golson, jazz saxophonist, in Philadelphia (d. 2024)
- Died: Oscar Underwood, 66, American politician

== Saturday, January 26, 1929 ==
- A coal mine explosion in Shenyang, northeast China killed 100 Chinese and 3 Japanese.
- The talking drama film The Wolf of Wall Street opened at the Rialto Theatre in New York City. It was George Bancroft's first talking film role.
- The film Redskin, starring Richard Dix and filmed partly in Technicolor, premiered at the Criterion Theatre in New York City.
- Born: Gordon Solie, professional wrestling announcer, in Minneapolis, Minnesota (d. 2000)
- Died: Catherine Mary MacSorley, 80, Irish writer

== Sunday, January 27, 1929 ==
- During a reconnaissance flight over King Edward VII Land in Antarctica, the Richard E. Byrd expedition discovered the Rockefeller Mountains and Washington Ridge, as well as Mounts Franklin, Mount Fitzsimmons, Frazier and Jackling.
- Born: Mohamed Al-Fayed, Egyptian business magnate, in Alexandria (d. 2023)

== Monday, January 28, 1929 ==
- Outgoing U.S. President Calvin Coolidge gave his farewell budget address before members of the business organizations of the government. Coolidge warned that the nation's prosperity would only continue if rigid economical practice was maintained.
- Born: Claes Oldenburg, Swedish-born American sculptor; in Stockholm (d. 2022)

== Tuesday, January 29, 1929 ==
- The Erich Maria Remarque novel All Quiet on the Western Front was published.
- The Seeing Eye guide dog school was established in Nashville, Tennessee.
- Born: G. Ross Anderson, U.S. federal judge, in Anderson, South Carolina (d. 2020)

== Wednesday, January 30, 1929 ==
- The German silent melodrama film Pandora's Box, starring American actress Louise Brooks, opened in Berlin.
- Inter-Island Airways, the forerunner of Hawaiian Airlines, was incorporated.
- Died:
  - Franklin J. Drake, 82, U.S. Navy admiral;
  - La Goulue (stage name for Louise Weber), 62, French dancer and star can-can dancer at the Moulin Rouge

== Thursday, January 31, 1929 ==
- An order issued expelling Leon Trotsky from the Soviet Union and sending him into exile. Trotsky left the U.S.S.R. the following month.
- Born:
  - Rudolf Mössbauer, German physicist, in Munich, Germany (d. 2011)
  - Jean Simmons, English film and TV actress, Emmy Award and Golden Globe winner; in Lower Holloway, London, (d. 2010)
- Died: Frederick Lambton, 4th Earl of Durham, 73, British peer and politician
