= Kauko Armas Nieminen =

Finnish self-taught physicist

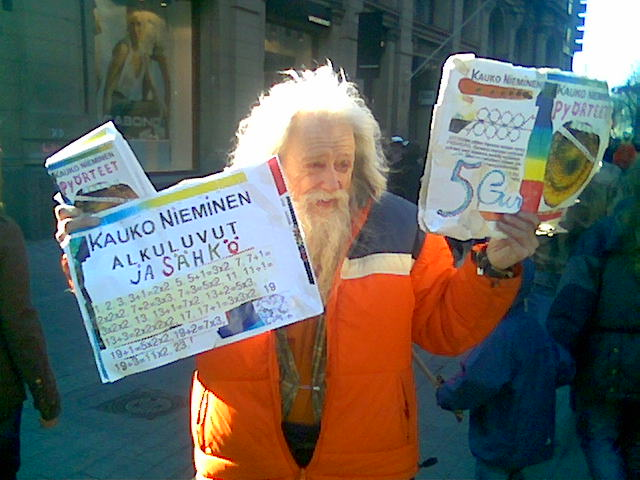
- Kauko Nieminen selling his works on the street
- Born: 15 February 1929; Kuopio
- Died: 2010
- Education: Bachelor of Laws
- Known for: pseudoscientific theory regarding ether vortices
- Parents: Paavali Nieminen (father); Aino Korhonen (mother)

Kauko Armas Nieminen (15 February 1929 – 2010) was a Finnish self-taught physicist.

Nieminen was born in Kuopio, Finland. Although he was most known for his work in physics, he had no academic training or degree in physics and was entirely self-taught. He had a bachelor's degree in law from the University of Helsinki.

Nieminen's research and theories in physics were unusual. The basis of his work was the theory of "ether vortices". In principle, the theory claims that the universe is full of ether, and as the ends of the ether come close to each other, vortices appear. The center of a vortex is an elementary particle. Nieminen claimed his theories could explain gravity, quantum phenomena, ball lightnings, and the creation of the world.

Nieminen was also very critical towards the established scientific community, though not towards students of science, and had been frequently invited to lecture to the same amidst mutual respect and good humor.

Nieminen had published several books. Nieminen did not use a commercial publisher or advertisement agency; instead, he published and distributed his books and advertisements himself.

Kauko Nieminen was a deputy city council member of Helsinki from 2001 to 2004. In the 2000 municipal elections, he was a candidate from the joint election list of the independent candidates in the Helsinki Metropolitan area.

== Publications ==
- Eetterin fysiikkaa (1980)
- ISBN 951-99532-4-8 Eetteripyörteet voimina (1984)
- ISBN 951-95474-6-0 Sähkö eetteripyörteitä (1987)
- ISBN 952-90-3110-6 Tajunta ja sähköpyörteitä (1991)
- ISBN 951-95474-8-7 Luomisen pyörteet (1993)
- ISBN 952-90-4757-6 Tajunnan pyörteet (1993)
- ISBN 952-90-5684-2 Kokonaisuuden eduksi (1994)
- ISBN 952-90-6991-X Aika ja aine (1995)
- ISBN 952-91-0836-2 Aika ja aine, osa 2 (1999)
- ISBN 952-91-2080-X Luoja ja alkuluvut (2000)
- ISBN 952-99004-0-6 Voima (2002)
- ISBN 952-99004-1-4 Eetteripyörre (2003)
- ISBN 952-99004-2-2 Jatko (2004)
- ISBN 952-99004-3-0 Pyörteet (2005)
- ISBN 952-99004-4-9 Alkuluvut ja sähkö (2006)
