= I'm Alone =

Canadian ship

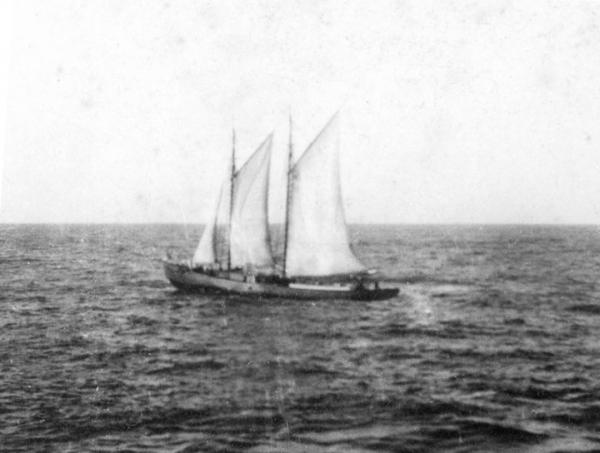
- I'm Alone on the day of her sinking
- Name: I'm Alone
- Port of registry: Lunenburg, Nova Scotia
- Yard number: 126
- Completed: 1923
- Fate: Sunk by the U.S. Coast Guard, 22 March 1929
- Type: Schooner
- Tonnage: 205 tons
- Propulsion: Sail and diesel engines
- Speed: 9 knots (maximum)
- Crew: 8

I'm Alone was a Canadian ship used as a rum runner during the era of Prohibition in the United States. She was best known for having been sunk by the United States Coast Guard in 1929 while trying to flee.

== History ==
The auxiliary schooner was built in Lunenburg Nova Scotia in 1923 (hull # 126), and for six years, she transported contraband alcohol. Another source says the ship was built in the United Kingdom. Her registry was in Lunenburg, Nova Scotia. I'm Alone was intercepted in the Gulf of Mexico off the coast of Louisiana by USCGC Wolcott on 22 March 1929, as the schooner was returning from Belize with liquor. The crew of I'm Alone disobeyed orders to stop and was shelled and sunk by USCGC Dexter. Seven of the ship's eight crew members were rescued. The eighth, a French Canadian boatswain, Leon Mainguy, died. The surviving crew members, including captain John "Jack" Randell, were arrested and jailed in New Orleans.

The sinking caused tensions in Canadian–American relations, with Envoy Vincent Massey criticizing the Americans' actions. The Canadian government sued for damages. Coast Guard intelligence personnel, led by Elizebeth Friedman, were able to demonstrate in international arbitration that the owners of I'm Alone were Americans, despite the ship's Canadian registry. As a result, the U.S. paid a fine much lower than the amount initially requested by Canada. Captain Randell and Amanda Mainguy, the widow of the crew member who died, both received restitution. The widow of dead sailor received $16,000 whilst Captain Randall received $7,000. The owners of the I'm Alone received no restitution.

The incident was described in song by Canadian poet/folk musician Wade Hemsworth, "The Sinking of the I'm Alone".
