= Dambila =

Island in East Nusa Tenggara, Indonesia

Dambila Island

Geography
- Location: Flores Sea
- Coordinates: 8°28′2″S 122°26′26″E
- Area: 6.25 km^{2} (2.41 sq mi)

Administration
- Indonesia
- Province: East Nusa Tenggara
- Regency: Sikka
- District: East Alok

Dambila Island (Indonesian: Pulau Dambila) is a small island located in the Flores Sea, off the northern coast of Flores. It is administered as part of East Alok district in Sikka Regency. It has an area of 6.25 square kilometres (2.41 sq mi), and is administered as part of the village of Parumaan. A majority of the island's population is of Bajo origin.
