= Besar Island, Flores =

Island in East Nusa Tenggara, Indonesia

Besar Island
- Interactive map of Besar Island

Geography
- Location: Flores Sea
- Coordinates: 8°27′45″S 122°22′39″E
- Area: 51.84 km^{2} (20.02 sq mi)
- Highest elevation: 931 m (3054 ft)

Administration
- Indonesia
- Province: East Nusa Tenggara
- Regency: Sikka
- District: East Alok

Demographics
- Population: 2,965 (2022 est.)

Besar Island (Indonesian: Pulau Besar) is an island in the Flores Sea, located near the larger island of Flores. It is part of the East Alok district of Sikka Regency, and comprises two villages of Koja Doi and Kojagete. It is over 50 square kilometers in size with around 3,000 inhabitants.

== Geography ==
The island has an area of 51.84 square kilometres (20.02 sq mi), not including the inhabited 4.5-hectare Koja Doi islet connected to it by a 680 metres (2,230 ft) stone causeway. It is the largest out of 18 registered islands in Sikka Regency. Its highest point is at 931 meters above sea level, the highest point compared to other islands in the Maumere Bay.

Generally, the island is accessed by speedboat from Maumere, a half-hour trip.

== History ==
The island was known to the Bajo people, who named it "Tukukaba" (meaning "Bat") after the bat populations on the island. Koja Doi (Bajo for "little acorn") used to be a disconnected islet, until locals with the help of the local Indonesian Army unit of Sikka constructed a stone causeway connecting Koja Doi and Besar. The bridge was repaired and improved in 1983.

Part of Besar Island was designated as a protected forest in 1983, with further expansions in 1987, 1999, 2014, and 2016. During the 1992 Flores earthquake and tsunami, the island's (and Koja Doi's) inhabitants did not suffer heavy casualties especially compared to the nearby Babi Island, due to the high elevation of Besar's peak where they evacuated. Many houses were destroyed by the tsunami, however, including the local village office of Koja Doi. Some of the ruins were deliberately preserved to this day, with the village office being rebuilt across the causeway on Besar.

A 190 kWp solar power station was opened on the island in 2019 near Koja Doi. A smaller 8.5 kWp station was established in 2022 near Kampung Loang, on the island's north side.

== Economy and demographics ==
The island's inhabitants are primarily fishermen and farmers, with maize, upland rice, cashew nuts, and teak being cultivated. There is some tourism to the island, centered at the Koja Doi islet.

Statistics Indonesia estimated the total population of the two villages of Koja Doi and Kojagete comprising the island (including the Koja Doi islet) at 2,965 people, with 1,477 in Koja Doi and 1,488 in Kojagete. There are two publicly funded elementary schools and one middle school in Besar. An auxiliary puskesmas was established on the island in 2022, and was upgraded to a full puskesmas on 11 October 2025. Prior to its establishment, no other healthcare facilities on the island, with inhabitants travelling to the nearby Pemana Islands for medical services.

== Ecology ==
There are populations of Javan rusa deer and green sea turtles on the island, which used to be hunted by local villagers, but are now protected. The waters immediately around Koja Doi is surrounded by coral reefs, and there are mangrove forests around the island.
