= Jan Djong =

Indonesian political activist and civil servant (1917–1966)

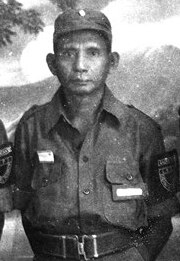
- Djong in 1950

Member of Sikka DPRD-GR
- In office 9 December 1961 – August 1962

Personal details
- Born: Johanes Djong; 1917 Sikka, Dutch East Indies
- Died: 1 March 1966 (aged 48) Maumere, East Nusa Tenggara, Indonesia

Johanes Djong (1917 – 1 March 1966), better known as Jan Djong, was an Indonesian political activist and civil servant. He was active in Sikka Regency, in East Nusa Tenggara during the 1950s and 1960s until his murder in 1966 as part of mass killings across the country. Djong was among the first political leaders in Sikka after Indonesia's independence, leading protests against its incumbent aristocracy. Within the local government, Djong was a member of Sikka's legislature and later served as district head (camat) of Kewapante in Sikka.

== Early life ==
Johanes Djong was born in 1917 at the village of Hewokloang, some distance southeast from Sikka's main town of Maumere. His father descended from the Raja of Kanga'e, a territory which had briefly been split off from the Kingdom of Sikka but later reannexed. Djong's older brother was a village head, and Djong began his education at Catholic schools. Around 1930, his brother introduced him to a Dutch priest who enrolled Djong at a newly founded missionary school in Ngada, at the time likely the best school in Flores.

== Career ==
After completing his education in Ngada, Djong moved back to Sikka and worked as a clerk at the Dutch colonial office in Maumere. Following the Japanese invasion of the Dutch East Indies, the Japanese occupation forces appointed Djong as kapitan (executive officer) of Iwang Gete, a traditional district around Djong's home village. At the end of the war, the Dutch returned to Flores and reasserted colonial authority, with Djong being dismissed from government posts due to working with the Japanese forces. The Raja of Sikka Don Thomas was returned to his office by the Dutch, and Djong was arrested in May 1948 for leading a protest against his removal which resulted in him being imprisoned for six months.

Indonesia attained full sovereignty over Flores from the Dutch in 1949, but central authority was initially weak in distant regions such as Sikka. Djong was soon released, and he began to agitate rural farmers against Don Thomas' authority. In some villages in Sikka, Djong's activities resulted in the torching of the homes of Raja officials, turning the villages into no-go zones for local officials. By 1951–1952, Djong was in contact with Vincentius Bata da Costa, a Makassar-educated student who advised Djong to establish a formal political organization for the rural parts of Sikka. The organization soon gained enough influence to force Don Thomas to agree to the establishment of an elected advisory body – with representatives drawn from the territories of smaller polities annexed into Sikka.

In June 1953, Djong organized the first ever political demonstration in Maumere, which opposed Don Thomas' direct control over a newly built school in Maumere. Don Thomas relented, and Djong would be appointed chairman of the school's board. The office of Raja would be abolished in September 1953, with Don Thomas being appointed as district head of the new Sikka Regency until his death the following year. Djong was later sentenced to three years' prison in 1957 over looting and violence related to protests he led. He was released early in 1959 by a presidential pardon, thanks to the lobbying of local political leader Laurentius Say. In that year, Djong campaigned for V.B. da Costa to become Sikka's regent, with da Costa winning the most votes from the legislature but the Minister of Home Affairs ultimately selected the more experienced Paulus Samador da Cunha. On 9 December 1961, Djong was sworn into Sikka's Regional House of Representatives, and in August 1962 he was appointed district head (camat) of Kewapante by da Cunha.

At Kewapante, Djong established good relations with the local air force base, but gradually came into conflict with local Catholic Party leaders over the recruitment of members. This conflict gradually escalated from 1963 to 1965, ultimately leading to a demonstration between Djong's supporters and Catholic Party supporters during a central government ministerial visit in 1965. Djong was immediately removed from his office the following day (as a district head, Djong was expected to be apolitical).

== Arrest and death ==
Immediately after the 30 September movement in Jakarta, local military commanders in Sikka began to investigate local Communist Party of Indonesia (PKI) leaders, but did not significantly repress them (the local party leader was sentenced to one month in prison). A new commander was appointed and by January 1966 he began arresting PKI leaders alongside some Indonesian National Party members. Djong was arrested in late January or early February 1966, and he was tortured in prison and paraded wearing just his underpants in Maumere. Close to his death, Djong requested a Catholic priest for a confession and to give him his last rites, but this request was refused with one jailer reportedly urinating on Djong's face. He succumbed to his wounds on 1 March 1966, at the age of 48, and his body was buried just outside the prison grounds. In total, between 800 and 1,500 people were estimated to have been murdered across Sikka alone during the killings.

In 2012, two skeletons were discovered by sand miners, one of which was thought to be Djong's. The bodies were quickly reburied by local officials who feared further controversy, and Djong's family did not pursue the matter. A detailed account of Jan Djong's career and the circumstances surrounding it and his death was published in 2019 by Dutch anthropologist Gerry van Klinken. In 2023, van Klinken compared Djong's environment of entrenched feudal power structures to modern Indonesia's autonomous local governments.
