= Paulus Samador da Cunha =

Indonesian politician (1924–1970)

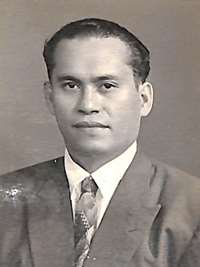
- Da Cunha, c. 1957

Member of the Constitutional Assembly
- In office 15 November 1956 – 5 July 1959
- Constituency: East Nusa Tenggara

Regent of Sikka
- In office 1 March 1960 – 6 September 1967
- Preceded by: D.P.C. Ximenes da Silva
- Succeeded by: Laurentius Say

Personal details
- Born: 13 January 1924 Sikka, Dutch East Indies
- Died: 19 September 1970 (aged 46) Kupang, East Nusa Tenggara, Indonesia
- Party: Catholic

Paulus Samador da Cunha (13 January 1924 – 19 September 1970) was an Indonesian politician and civil servant. He served as a member of the Constitutional Assembly of Indonesia between 1956 and 1959, and as the first regent of Sikka from 1960 to 1967. A member of the Catholic Party, da Cunha's tenure in Sikka saw the construction of a new sports stadium, agricultural expansion, and anti-communist mass killings in 1966.

== Early life ==
Paulus Samador da Cunha was born on 13 January 1924 in Sikka village (the old capital of the Kingdom of Sikka) in present-day Sikka Regency, on the island of Flores. He was educated at a Catholic seminary in Todabelu (present-day Ngada Regency), graduating in 1941. He later studied government administration at a law high school in Makassar, graduating in 1953. While there, he became a good friend to Laurentius Say, a fellow Sikkan and a distant relative.

== Career ==
After completing his studies at the seminary, da Cunha found employment as a civil servant, initially at the municipal government office in Nagekeo, still in Flores. After the Japanese occupation, he moved to the provisional local government in Ngada, and within the State of East Indonesia he became secretary at the regional legislature for Flores. On 15 November 1956, he was appointed to the Constitutional Assembly of Indonesia as a Catholic Party representative. This appointment resulted in da Cunha frequently travelling to Jakarta from Flores, which significantly improved his prestige in Flores.

=== In Sikka ===
Returning to Sikka, da Cunha ran to become its new regent, with Say as his political ally. Their primary rival was Vincentius Bata da Costa, who was backed by local political activist Jan Djong. Da Costa won a vote in Sikka's legislature by a one-vote margin, but the Ministry of Home Affairs ultimately appointed da Cunha on account of his experience. He was sworn in as regent on 1 March 1960.

Early in his tenure, Sikka ordered the construction of a sports stadium in Maumere – at that time the largest stadium in East Nusa Tenggara. It was constructed in expectation of a Flores-wide sports festival, and was inaugurated on 20 April 1961, one day before the event's start. Da Cunha also promoted the opening of new agricultural land across the regency to increase local food production.

Not long after his election, Da Cunha's political alliance with Say began to fracture over access to financial proceeds of a municipally-owned copra company. Say enlisted the support of Djong (now a member of Sikka's legislature) to press da Cunha on official appointments. By 1963, Djong had been reassigned as a district head directly under da Cunha, and Say had been dispatched to Manila by the central government, solidifying da Cunha's political influence in Sikka. In July 1963, da Cunha was appointed chairman of the Catholic Party's branch in Sikka and the party soon extensively began to recruit members throughout the regency. This led to another conflict with Djong, which lasted until his removal by the Ministry of Home Affairs in June 1965. Anti-communist mass killings occurred in Sikka late in his term, with between 800 and 1,500 people (including Djong) killed.

Da Cunha was replaced by Say on 6 September 1967 and was reassigned to the provincial government's office in Kupang.

== Death ==
Da Cunha died on 19 September 1970 at the provincial capital of Kupang, while he still held his position at the provincial government. The Maumere stadium constructed during his tenure was renamed the Stadion Gelora Samador (Samador Sports Arena Stadium) after him.
