= Pulau Besar =

Pulau Besar (meaning Big Island in Malay language) may refer to:

- Pulau Besar (Johor), an island in the South China Sea off the east coast of Johor, Malaysia
- Besar Island, Malacca, an island in the Strait of Malacca off the coast of Malacca, Malaysia
- Besar Island, Flores, an island in the Flores Sea off Maumere, Indonesia
