= Laurentius Say =

Indonesian politician

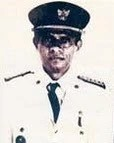
- Say in 1967

Member of the House of Representatives
- In office 1 October 1977 – 1 October 1982
- Constituency: East Nusa Tenggara

Regent of Sikka
- In office 6 September 1967 – 19 September 1977
- Preceded by: Paulus Samador da Cunha
- Succeeded by: Daniel Woda Palle

Personal details
- Born: 2 February 1924 Sikka, Dutch East Indies
- Died: 25 July 2007 (aged 83)
- Party: Golkar

Laurentius Say (2 February 1924 – 25 July 2007) was an Indonesian politician. He served as a member of the House of Representatives from 1977 to 1982, and was previously regent of Sikka Regency in East Nusa Tenggara between 1967 and 1977. Having studied in Java and being a Republican fighter during the Indonesian National Revolution, Say previously worked and led a government-owned copra cooperative operating in Flores before his appointment as regent.

== Early life ==
Laurentius Say was born on 2 February 1924 at the village of Uma Uta-Bola, southeast of the town of Maumere in Sikka. His father was a well-off coconut planter, and Say initially studied at an elementary school in Ende. After graduating, Say was sent to Malang in Java for further studies. During the Indonesian National Revolution, Say would join the fledgling Indonesian Army and fought in the conflict, going to Makassar to study agriculture after its conclusion. He briefly took an economics course in the United Kingdom to study the economics of copra.

== Career ==
Upon his return to Indonesia, Say worked at the Copra Foundation, a government-formed regulatory body for copra farmers especially in Eastern Indonesia. By 1956, he had been appointed the body's head in Ende in Flores. The foundation was reorganized in 1958 into a network of smaller cooperatives, and Say established local units across Flores while moving his office to Maumere.

=== In Sikka ===
Prior to his return to Sikka, Say had befriended Constitutional Assembly of Indonesia member Paulus Samador da Cunha, of whom he was a distant relative and had studied together in Makassar. In 1959, Sikka's legislative assembly held an election to select a new regent (bupati), with Say backing da Cunha's candidacy. Their primary opponent was law practitioner Vincentius Bata da Costa, backed by influential local politician Jan Djong. Although da Costa won the assembly vote, the Ministry of Home Affairs in Jakarta opted to appoint the more experienced da Cunha as regent.

Say's leadership of the copra cooperative gave him significant political influence in Sikka, namely through patronage of businessmen, and magnified by the fact that copra was practically Sikka's only significant trade good. This led to some political conflict with da Cunha, which largely ended in 1963 when Say was summoned to Jakarta by Frans Seda, who sent him to Manila. In 1967, Say had returned to Sikka, where an assembly vote was being held to replace da Cunha. Say won 5 votes out of 17 cast, placing second, but like da Cunha before him he was appointed by the Home Affairs minister to serve as regent and was sworn in on 6 September 1967. His first term was to end in 1972, but it was extended to 1973.

During the 1971 Indonesian legislative election, Say, like other regional leaders, received an explicit instruction from the Suharto government in Jakarta to campaign and push for Golkar's victory by any means necessary. Say, likely due to his close personal connection with Catholic Party leaders such as Ben Mang Reng Say (his brother) and Frans Seda, opted against doing so and allowed all parties to campaign normally, and ordered the disposal of pre-voted ballots. The Catholic Party won the election in Sikka – the only region of Flores where it did so. Say was later reportedly scolded by Ali Murtopo, but Murtopo relented after a phone call with Seda. Despite expectations from local Golkar functionaries, with one claiming he would "run around town naked" if Say survived two terms, Say managed to secure a second term.

His tenure as regent ended in September 1977, when he was elected as a Golkar member of the House of Representatives representing East Nusa Tenggara.

== Later life ==
After his DPR term, Say returned to Sikka where he largely stayed for the rest of his life. He continued to work with Seda, in one occasion persuading Seda to drop his ownership of a company which was granted monopoly rights on tourism in Maumere Bay. Say remained active during major events at Maumere, including Pope John Paul II's visit in 1989 and relief efforts following the 1992 earthquake and tsunami. He died on 25 July 2007, and was buried in Maumere.

Maumere's seaport was renamed after him in 2010. Say's son Fransiskus Stephanus Say became active in Sikka's local politics.
