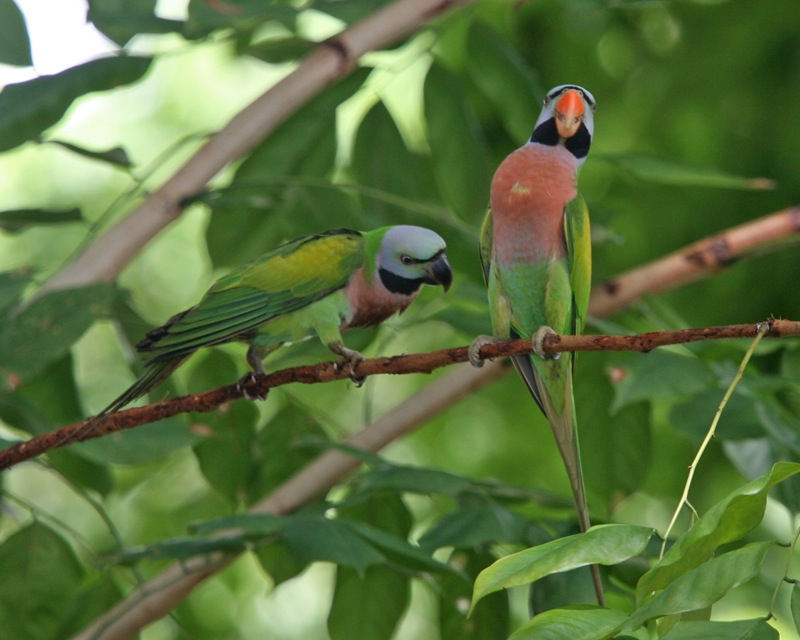
- Female (left) and male (right)

Conservation status
- Near Threatened (IUCN 3.1)
- CITES Appendix II

Scientific classification
- Kingdom: Animalia
- Phylum: Chordata
- Class: Aves
- Order: Psittaciformes
- Family: Psittaculidae
- Genus: Psittacula
- Species: P. alexandri

Binomial name
- Psittacula alexandri (Linnaeus, 1758)
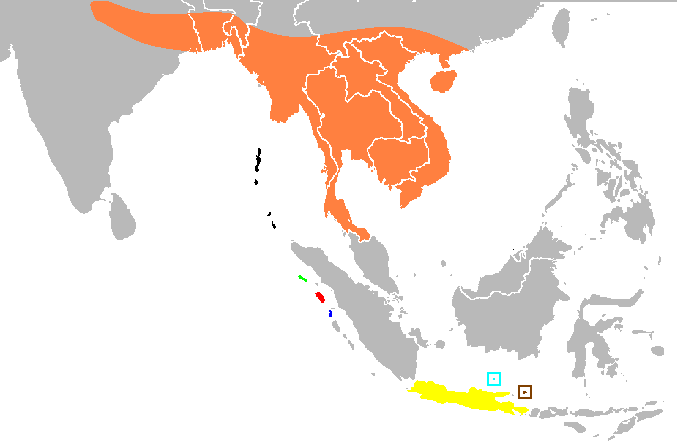
- Psittacula alexandri distribution by subspecies

Synonyms
- Psittacus alexandri Linnaeus, 1758

= Red-breasted parakeet =

Species of bird

The red-breasted parakeet (Psittacula alexandri) is a parrot native to Southeast Asia. It is among the more widespread species of the genus and is the species which has the most geographical variations. It is easily identified by the large red patch on its breast. An alternative name is the moustached parakeet depending on subspecies. Most of the subspecies are confined to minuscule islands or a cluster of islands in Indonesia. One subspecies occurs in the Andaman Islands, and one subspecies occurs in continental Southeast Asia and partly extending to northeastern parts of South Asia along the foothills of the Himalayas. Some of the island races may be threatened by the wild bird trade. The nominate race, which occurs in Java, is close to extinction.

Feral populations of this species have now established themselves in cities like Mumbai and Singapore. Small numbers occur in other cities such as Chennai and Bangalore in India.

== Taxonomy ==
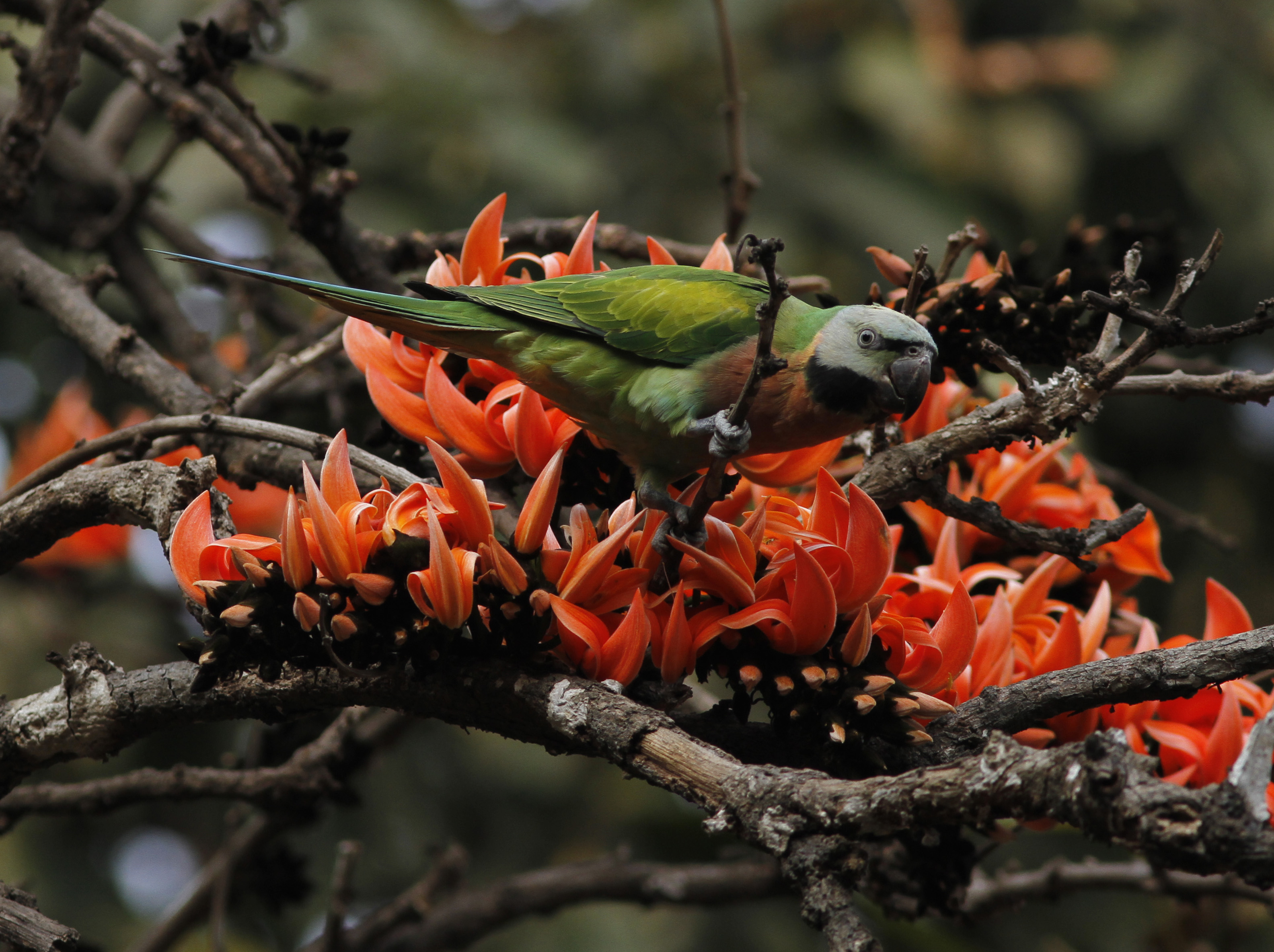
Female, Bangladesh

The red-breasted parakeet was formally described in 1758 by the Swedish naturalist Carl Linnaeus in the tenth edition of his Systema Naturae. He placed it with all the other parrots in the genus Psittacus and coined the binomial name Psittacus alexandri. The type locality is the island of Java. The red-breasted parakeet is now placed in the genus Psittacula that was introduced in 1800 by the French naturalist Georges Cuvier. The genus name is a diminutive of the Latin word psittacus for a "parrot". The specific epithet alexandri is from Alexander the Great whose soldiers introduced parakeets to Greece.

Eight subspecies are recognised:

- P. a. fasciata (Müller, PLS, 1776) – north India to south China and Indochina
- P. a. abbotti (Oberholser, 1919) – Andaman Islands
- P. a. cala (Oberholser, 1912) – Simeulue (west of north Sumatra)
- P. a. major (Richmond, 1902) – Lasia and Babi Islands (west of north Sumatra)
- P. a. perionca (Oberholser, 1912) – Nias (west of north Sumatra)
- P. a. alexandri (Linnaeus, 1758) – Java, Bali and south Borneo
- P. a. dammermani Chasen & Kloss, 1932 – Karimunjawa Islands (north of central Java)
- P. a. kangeanensis Hoogerwerf, 1962 – Kangean Islands (north of Bali)
