= Kangae =

- District
- Interactive map of Kangae
- Coordinates: 8°40′20″S 122°15′20″E
- Country: Indonesia
- Province: East Nusa Tenggara
- Regency: Sikka

Area
  - Total: 38.43 km^{2} (14.84 sq mi)

Population (2024 est.)
  - Total: 19,451
  - Density: 506.1/km^{2} (1,311/sq mi)

Kangae is a district of Sikka Regency, in the East Nusa Tenggara province of Indonesia. Located to the east of the town of Maumere, the district has a population of nearly 20,000 people. Between 1902 and 1923, it was the site of a small polity (Kingdom of Kangae) which split off from the larger Kingdom of Sikka before it was reannexed.

== Geography ==
The district is located on the north shore of Flores stretching inland, bordering the regency seat of Maumere to its west. It has a land area of 38.43 square kilometres (14.84 sq mi), and is further subdivided into nine villages – which in turn included 56 rukun warga and 161 rukun tetangga.

== History ==
The area was historically inhabited by Bajau Muslim fishermen who swore fealty to the (predominantly Catholic) Kingdom of Sikka. However, in 1900 the Kangae ruler, Nai, took up arms against Sikka, and by late 1902 Dutch colonial authorities had recognized him as raja of Kangae. The Dutch recognition also saw territories under Kangae influence expand to cover much of the eastern parts of the modern-day regency. This polity lasted only briefly and experienced unrest due to the implementation of head taxes during the 1910s. Nai was pensioned in 1923, and Kangae was reannexed into Sikka.

During the Pacific War, Japanese forces occupying Sikka established defensive positions in dugout caverns overlooking the shore. The present-day district was part of Kewapante District until 2007, when it was split off into its own administrative unit.

== Demographics ==
As of 2024, Statistics Indonesia estimated the population of Kangae at 19,451, which included 9,193 males and 10,258 females. There are 17 primary schools, four middle schools, and one high school in the district.
