= List of districts of East Nusa Tenggara =

The province of East Nusa Tenggara (Provinsi Nusa Tenggara Timur) in Indonesia is divided into twenty-one regencies (Indonesian: Kabupaten) plus the independent city (Indonesian: Kota) of Kupang. These in turn are divided administratively into districts, known as Kecamantan.

The districts of East Nusa Tenggara, with the regency each falls into, are as follows:

| District (Kecamantan) | Regency (Kabupaten) |
|---|---|
| Adonara Barat, Flores Timur | Flores Timur (East Flores) |
| Adonara Timur, Flores Timur | Flores Timur (East Flores) |
| Aesesa, Nagekeo | Nagekeo |
| Aimere, Ngada | Ngada |
| Alak, Kupang | Kupang |
| Alok Barat, Sikka | Sikka |
| Alok Timur, Sikka | Sikka |
| Alok, Sikka | Sikka |
| Alor Barat Daya, Alor | Alor |
| Alor Barat Laut, Alor | Alor |
| Alor Selatan, Alor | Alor |
| Alor Tengah Utara, Alor | Alor |
| Alor Timur Laut, Alor | Alor |
| Alor Timur, Alor | Alor |
| Amabi Oefeto Timur, Kupang | Kupang |
| Amanatun Selatan, Timor Tengah Selatan | Timor Tengah Selatan (South Central Timor) |
| Amanatun Tengah, Timor Tengah Selatan | Timor Tengah Selatan (South Central Timor) |
| Amanatun Timur, Timor Tengah Selatan | Timor Tengah Selatan (South Central Timor) |
| Amanatun Utara, Timor Tengah Selatan | Timor Tengah Selatan (South Central Timor) |
| Amanuban Barat, Timor Tengah Selatan | Timor Tengah Selatan (South Central Timor) |
| Amanuban Selatan, Timor Tengah Selatan | Timor Tengah Selatan (South Central Timor) |
| Amarasi Barat, Kupang | Kupang |
| Amarasi Selatan, Kupang | Kupang |
| Amarasi Timur, Kupang | Kupang |
| Amarasi, Kupang | Kupang |
| Amfoang Barat Daya, Kupang | Kupang |
| Amfoang Barat Laut, Kupang | Kupang |
| Amfoang Selatan, Kupang | Kupang |
| Amfoang Utara, Kupang | Kupang |
| Atadei, Lembata | Lembata |
| Atambua, Belu | Belu |
| Bajawa, Ngada | Ngada |
| Batu Putih, Timor Tengah Selatan | Timor Tengah Selatan (South Central Timor) |
| Biboki Anleu, Timor Tengah Utara | Timor Tengah Utara (North Central Timor) |
| Biboki Selatan, Timor Tengah Utara | Timor Tengah Utara (North Central Timor) |
| Biboki Utara, Timor Tengah Utara | Timor Tengah Utara (North Central Timor) |
| Boawae, Nagekeo | Nagekeo |
| Boking, Timor Tengah Selatan | Timor Tengah Selatan (South Central Timor) |
| Bola, Sikka | Sikka |
| Busalangga, Rote Ndao | Rote Ndao |
| Buyasari, Lembata | Lembata |
| Cibal, Manggarai | Manggarai |
| Detukeli, Ende | Ende |
| Detusoko, Ende | Ende |
| Elar, Manggarai | Manggarai |
| Ende Selatan, Ende | Ende |
| Ende Tengah, Ende | Ende |
| Ende Timur, Ende | Ende |
| Ende Utara, Ende | Ende |
| Ende, Ende | Ende |
| Fatuleu, Kupang | Kupang |
| Fatumnasi, Timor Tengah Selatan | Timor Tengah Selatan (South Central Timor) |
| Haharu, Sumba Timur | Sumba Timur (East Sumba) |
| Hawu Mehara, Sabu Raijua | Sabu Raijua Regency |
| Ile Ape, Lembata | Lembata |
| Ile Boleng, Flores Timur | Flores Timur (East Flores) |
| Ile Mandiri, Flores Timur | Flores Timur (East Flores) |
| Insana Utara, Timor Tengah Utara | Timor Tengah Utara (North Central Timor) |
| Insana, Timor Tengah Utara | Timor Tengah Utara (North Central Timor) |
| Jere Buu, Ngada | Ngada |
| Kadi Bangedo, Sumba Barat | Sumba Barat (West Sumba) |
| Kahaungu Eti, Sumba Timur | Sumba Timur (East Sumba) |
| Kakuluk Mesak, Belu | Belu |
| Kalbano, Timor Tengah Selatan | Timor Tengah Selatan (South Central Timor) |
| Karera, Sumba Timur | Sumba Timur (East Sumba) |
| Katikutana, Sumba Tengah | Sumba Tengah (Central Sumba) |
| Kelapa Lima, Kupang | Kupang |
| Kelimutu, Ende | Ende |
| Kelubagolit, Flores Timur | Flores Timur (East Flores) |
| Keo Tengah, Nagekeo | Nagekeo |
| Kewapante, Sikka | Sikka |
| Kie, Timor Tengah Selatan | Timor Tengah Selatan (South Central Timor) |
| Kobalima, Belu | Belu |
| Kodi Bangedo, Sumba Barat Daya | Sumba Barat Daya (Southwest Sumba) |
| Kodi Utara, Sumba Barat Daya | Sumba Barat Daya (Southwest Sumba) |
| Kodi, Sumba Barat | Sumba Barat (West Sumba) |
| Kodi, Sumba Barat Daya | Sumba Barat Daya (Southwest Sumba) |
| Komodo, Manggarai Barat | Manggarai Barat (West Manggarai) |
| Kot'olin, Timor Tengah Selatan | Timor Tengah Selatan (South Central Timor) |
| Kota Kefamenanu, Timor Tengah Utara | Timor Tengah Utara (North Central Timor) |
| Kota Komba, Manggarai | Manggarai |
| Kota Soe, Timor Tengah Selatan | Timor Tengah Selatan (South Central Timor) |
| Kota Waikabuak, Sumba Barat | Sumba Barat (West Sumba) |
| Kota Waingapu, Sumba Timur | Sumba Timur (East Sumba) |
| Kotabaru, Ende | Ende |
| Kualin, Timor Tengah Selatan | Timor Tengah Selatan (South Central Timor) |
| Kuan Fatu, Timor Tengah Selatan | Timor Tengah Selatan (South Central Timor) |
| Kupang Barat, Kupang | Kupang |
| Kupang Tengah, Kupang | Kupang |
| Kupang Timur, Kupang | Kupang |
| Kuwus, Manggarai Barat | Manggarai Barat (West Manggarai) |
| Lamakmen, Belu | Belu |
| Lambaleda, Manggarai | Manggarai |
| Lamboya, Sumba Barat | Sumba Barat (West Sumba) |
| Langke Rembong, Manggarai | Manggarai |
| Larantuka, Flores Timur | Flores Timur (East Flores) |
| Laura, Sumba Barat | Sumba Barat (West Sumba) |
| Laura, Sumba Barat Daya | Sumba Barat Daya (Southwest Sumba) |
| Lebatukan, Lembata | Lembata |
| Lela, Sikka | Sikka |
| Lembor, Manggarai Barat | Manggarai Barat (West Manggarai) |
| Lewa, Sumba Timur | Sumba Timur (East Sumba) |
| Lio Timur, Ende | Ende |
| Lobalain, Rote Ndao | Rote Ndao |
| Loli, Sumba Barat | Sumba Barat (West Sumba) |
| Macang Pacar, Manggarai Barat | Manggarai Barat (West Manggarai) |
| Magekoba/Maurole, Ende | Ende |
| Malaka Barat, Belu | Belu |
| Malaka Tengah, Belu | Belu |
| Malaka Timur, Belu | Belu |
| Mamboro, Sumba Tengah | Sumba Tengah (Central Sumba) |
| Matawai Lapau, Sumba Timur | Sumba Timur (East Sumba) |
| Maukaro, Ende | Ende |
| Maulafa, Kupang | Kupang |
| Maumere, Sikka | Sikka |
| Mauponggo, Nagekeo | Nagekeo |
| Mbay, Nagekeo | Nagekeo |
| Mborong, Manggarai | Manggarai |
| Mego, Sikka | Sikka |
| Miomafo Barat, Timor Tengah Utara | Timor Tengah Utara (North Central Timor) |
| Miomafo Timur, Timor Tengah Utara | Timor Tengah Utara (North Central Timor) |
| Mollo Selatan, Timor Tengah Selatan | Timor Tengah Selatan (South Central Timor) |
| Mollo Utara, Timor Tengah Selatan | Timor Tengah Selatan (South Central Timor) |
| Nagawutung, Lembata | Lembata |
| Namodale, Rote Ndao | Rote Ndao |
| Nanga Panda, Ende | Ende |
| Nangaroro, Nagekeo | Nagekeo |
| Ndona Timur, Ende | Ende |
| Ndona, Ende | Ende |
| Nekemese, Kupang | Kupang |
| Ngada Bawa, Ngada | Ngada |
| Nggaha Oriangu, Sumba Timur | Sumba Timur (East Sumba) |
| Nitta, Sikka | Sikka |
| Noemuti, Timor Tengah Utara | Timor Tengah Utara (North Central Timor) |
| Nubatukan, Lembata | Lembata |
| Nunkolo, Timor Tengah Selatan | Timor Tengah Selatan (South Central Timor) |
| Oebobo, Kupang | Kupang |
| Oenino, Timor Tengah Selatan | Timor Tengah Selatan (South Central Timor) |
| Omesuri, Lembata | Lembata |
| Paberiwai, Sumba Timur | Sumba Timur (East Sumba) |
| Paga, Sikka | Sikka |
| Pahunga Lodu, Sumba Timur | Sumba Timur (East Sumba) |
| Palue, Sikka | Sikka |
| Pandawai, Sumba Timur | Sumba Timur (East Sumba) |
| Pantai Baru, Rote Ndao | Rote Ndao |
| Pantar Barat, Alor | Alor |
| Pantar, Alor | Alor |
| Pinu Pahar, Sumba Timur | Sumba Timur (East Sumba) |
| Polen, Timor Tengah Selatan | Timor Tengah Selatan (South Central Timor) |
| Ponco Ranaka, Manggarai | Manggarai |
| Pulau Ende, Ende | Ende |
| Raihat, Belu | Belu |
| Raijua, Sabu Raijua | Sabu Raijua Regency |
| Reo, Manggarai | Manggarai |
| Rindi, Sumba Timur | Sumba Timur (East Sumba) |
| Rinhat, Belu | Belu |
| Riung Barat, Ngada | Ngada |
| Riung, Ngada | Ngada |
| Rote Barat Daya, Rote Ndao | Rote Ndao |
| Rote Barat Laut, Rote Ndao | Rote Ndao |
| Rote Barat, Rote Ndao | Rote Ndao |
| Rote Selatan, Rote Ndao | Rote Ndao |
| Rote Tengah, Rote Ndao | Rote Ndao |
| Rote Timur, Rote Ndao | Rote Ndao |
| Ruteng, Manggarai | Manggarai |
| Sabu Barat, Sabu Raijua | Sabu Raijua Regency |
| Sabu Liae, Sabu Raijua | Sabu Raijua Regency |
| Sabu Tengah, Sabu Raijua | Sabu Raijua Regency |
| Sabu Timur, Sabu Raijua | Sabu Raijua Regency |
| Sambi Rambas, Manggarai | Manggarai |
| Sanonggoang, Manggarai Barat | Manggarai Barat (West Manggarai) |
| Sasita Mean, Belu | Belu |
| Satarmese, Manggarai | Manggarai |
| Semau, Kupang | Kupang |
| Soa, Ngada | Ngada |
| Solor Barat, Flores Timur | Flores Timur (East Flores) |
| Solor Timur, Flores Timur | Flores Timur (East Flores) |
| Sulamu, Kupang | Kupang |
| Tabundung, Sumba Timur | Sumba Timur (East Sumba) |
| Takari, Kupang | Kupang |
| Talibura, Sikka | Sikka |
| Tana Righu, Sumba Barat | Sumba Barat (West Sumba) |
| Tanjung Bunga, Flores Timur | Flores Timur (East Flores) |
| Tasefeto Barat, Belu | Belu |
| Tasifeto Timur, Belu | Belu |
| Teluk Mutiara, Alor | Alor |
| Tionas, Timor Tengah Selatan | Timor Tengah Selatan (South Central Timor) |
| Titihena, Flores Timur | Flores Timur (East Flores) |
| Umalulu, Sumba Timur | Sumba Timur (East Sumba) |
| Umbu Ratu Nggay Barat, Sumba Tengah | Sumba Tengah (Central Sumba) |
| Umbu Ratu Nggay, Sumba Tengah | Sumba Tengah (Central Sumba) |
| Wae Rii, Manggarai | Manggarai |
| Waigete, Sikka | Sikka |
| Wanokaka, Sumba Barat | Sumba Barat (West Sumba) |
| Wewaria, Ende | Ende |
| Wewena Barat, Sumba Barat | Sumba Barat (West Sumba) |
| Wewena Selatan, Sumba Barat | Sumba Barat (West Sumba) |
| Wewena Timur, Sumba Barat | Sumba Barat (West Sumba) |
| Wewena Utara, Sumba Barat | Sumba Barat (West Sumba) |
| Wewewa Barat, Sumba Barat Daya | Sumba Barat Daya (Southwest Sumba) |
| Wewewa Selatan, Sumba Barat Daya | Sumba Barat Daya (Southwest Sumba) |
| Wewewa Timur, Sumba Barat Daya | Sumba Barat Daya (Southwest Sumba) |
| Wewewa Utara, Sumba Barat Daya | Sumba Barat Daya (Southwest Sumba) |
| Witihama, Flores Timur | Flores Timur (East Flores) |
| Wogomang Ulewa, Ngada | Ngada |
| Wolo Waru, Ende | Ende |
| Wolojita, Ende | Ende |
| Wolowae, Nagekeo | Nagekeo |
| Wotan Ulu Mado, Flores Timur | Flores Timur (East Flores) |
| Wulandoni, Lembata | Lembata |
| Wulanggitang, Flores Timur | Flores Timur (East Flores) |
| Wulla Waijelu, Sumba Timur | Sumba Timur (East Sumba) |

== Villages ==
Administrative villages (desa) listed for each district:

| Regency | District | Languages in district | Administrative villages |
|---|---|---|---|
| Alor | Alor Barat Daya | | Halerman, Kafelulang, Kuifana, Manatang, Margeta, Moramam, Morba, Moru, Orgen, Pailelang, Pintumas (Pintu Mas), Probur, Probur Utara, Tribur, Wakapsir, Wakapsir Timur, Wolwal, Wolwal Barat, Wolwal Selatan, Wolwal Tengah |
| Alor | Alor Barat Laut | | Adang, Aimoli, Alaang, Alila, Alila Selatan, Alor Besar, Alor Kecil, Ampera, Bampalola, Dulolong, Dulolong Barat, Hulnani, Lefokisu, Lewalu, O'a Mate (O A Mate), Otvai, Pulau Buaya, Ternate, Ternate Selatan |
| Alor | Alor Selatan | | Kelaisi Barat, Kelaisi Tengah (Kalaisi Tengah), Kelaisi Timur, Kiraman, Kuneman, Lella, Maikang, Malaipea, Manmas, Padang Alang, Sidabui, Silaipui, Subo, Tamanapui |
| Alor | Alor Tengah Utara | | Alimebung (Alim Mebung), Dapitau, Fuisama, Fungafeng, Kafakbeka, Lakwati, Lembur Barat, Lembur Tengah, Likwatang (Likuwatang), Manetwati, Nur Benlelang (Nurbenlelang), Petleng, Tominuku, Welai Selatan |
| Alor | Alor Timur | | Belemana, Elok, Kolana Selatan, Kolana Utara, Maritaing, Maukuru, Mausamang, Padang Panjang, Tanglapui, Tanglapui Timur |
| Alor | Alor Timur Laut | | Air Mancur, Kamot, Kenarimbala, Lippang, Nailang, Pido, Taramana, Waisika |
| Alor | Kabola | | Alila Timur, Kabola, Kopidil, Lawahing, Pante Deere (Pante Deera) |
| Alor | Lembur | | Lembur Timur, Luba, Talwai, Tasi, Tulleng, Waimi |
| Alor | Mataru | | Kamaifui, Lakatuli, Mataru Barat, Mataru Selatan, Mataru Timur, Mataru Utara, Taman Mataru |
| Alor | Pantar | | Bana, Bandar, Baolang, Bouweli, Bukit Mas, Helangdohi (Helandohi), Kabir, Madar, Munaseli, Pandai, Wailawar |
| Alor | Pantar Barat | | Baraler, Baranusa, Blang Merang, Illu, Kalondama, Leer, Piringsina |
| Alor | Pantar Baru Laut (Pantar Barat Laut) | | Allumang, Beangonong, Kalondama Barat, Kalondama Tengah, Kayang, Lamma, Marisa |
| Alor | Pantar Tengah | | Aramaba, Bagang, Delaki, Eka Jaya, Mauta, Muriabang, Tamakh (Tamak), Toang, Tubbe (Tube), Tude |
| Alor | Pantar Timur | | Batu, Bungabali (Bunga Bali), Kaera, Kaleb, Lalafang, Lekom, Mawar, Merdeka, Nule, Ombay, Treweng/Tereweng |
| Alor | Pulau Pura | | Maru, Pura, Pura Barat, Pura Selatan, Pura Timur, Pura Utara |
| Alor | Pureman | | Kailesa, Langkuru, Langkuru Utara, Purnama |
| Alor | Teluk Mutiara | | Adang Buom, Air Kenari, Binongko, Fanating, Kalabahi Barat, Kalabahi Kota, Kalabahi Tengah, Kalabahi Timur, Lendola, Motongbang, Mutiara, Nusa Kenari, Teluk Kenari, Welai Barat, Welai Timur, Wetabua |
| Belu | Atambua Barat | | Bardao (Berdao), Beirafu, Tulamalae, Umanen |
| Belu | Atambua Selatan | | Fatukbot, Lidak, Manuaman, Rinbesi |
| Belu | Kakuluk Mesak | | Dualaus (Dua Laus), Fatuketi, Jenilu, Kabuna, Kenebibi, Leosama |
| Belu | Kota Atambua (Atambua Kota) | | Fatubenao, Kota Atambua (Atambua kota), Manumutin, Tenukiik |
| Belu | Lamaknen | | Dirun, Duarato, Fulur, Kewar, Lamaksenulu, Leowalu, Mahuitas, Makir, Maudemu |
| Belu | Lamaknen Selatan | | Debululik, Ekin, Henes, Lakmaras, Loonuna, Lutha Rato (Lutarato), Nualain, Sisi Fatuberal |
| Belu | Lasiolat | | Baudaok, Dualasi, Dualasi Rai Ulun (Raiulun), Fatulotu, Lakan Mau (Lakanmau), Lasiolat, Maneikun |
| Belu | Nanaet Duabesi | | Dubesi, Fohoeka, Nanaenoe, Nanaet |
| Belu | Raihat | | Aitoun, Asumanu, Maumutin, Raifatus, Tohe, Tohe Leten (Toheleten) |
| Belu | Raimanuk | | Dua Koran (Duakoran), Faturika, Leuntolu, Mandeu, Mandeu Raimanus (Raimanus), Rafae, Renrua, Tasain, Teun |
| Belu | Tasifeto Barat | | Bakustulama, Derokfaturene (Derok Faturene), Lawalutolus, Lookeu, Naekasa, Naitimu, Rinbesihat, Tukuneno |
| Belu | Tasifeto Timur | | Bauho, Dafala, Fatuba'a, Halimodok, Manleten, Sadi, Sarabau (Sabarau / Saraban), Silawan, Takirin, Tialai, Tulakadi, Umaklaran |
| Ende | Detukeli | | Detukeli, Detumbewa, Jeo Du'a, Kanganara, Kebesani, Maurole Selatan, Nggesa, Nggesabiri, Nida, Unggu, Watunggere, Watunggere Marilonga, Wolomuku |
| Ende | Detusoko | | Detusoko, Detusoko Barat, Dile, Golulada, Ndito, Niowula, Nuaone, Randoria, Ranga, Rateroru, Roa, Saga, Sipijena, Turunalu, Wolofeo, Wologai, Wologai Tengah, Wolomage, Wolomasi, Wolotolo, Wolotolo Tengah |
| Ende | Ende | | Embu Ngena, Emburia, Embutheru, Ja Moke Asa, Jejaraja, Mbotutenda, Nakuramba, Ndetundora I, Ndetundora II, Ndetundora III, Nemboramba, Nuaja, Peozakaramba, Raburia, Randorama, Randotonda, Ranoramba, Riaraja, Rukuramba (Ruku Ramba), Tendambonggi, Tinabani, Tomberabu 1, Tomberabu II, Tonggopapa (Tonggopajoa), Uzuramba, Uzuramba Barat, Wajakea Jaya, Wawonato, Wologai, Wologai Dua, Wolokaro, Worhopapa |
| Ende | Ende Selatan | | Mbongawani, Paupanda, Rukun Lima (Rukunlima), Tanjung, Tetandara |
| Ende | Ende Tengah | | Kelimutu, Onekore, Paupire, Potulando |
| Ende | Ende Timur | | Kedebodu, Mautapaga, Ndungga, Rewarangga, Rewarangga Selatan, Tiwutewa |
| Ende | Ende Utara | | Borokanda, Embundoa, Gheoghoma, Kota Raja, Kota Ratu, Mbomba, Raterua (Rateru), Roworena, Roworena Barat, Watusipi |
| Ende | Kelimutu | | Detuena, Koanara, Nduaria, Nuamuri, Nuamuri Barat, Pemo, Waturaka, Woloara, Wolokelo |
| Ende | Kota Baru | | Hangalande, Kotabaru, Liselande, Loboniki, Ndondo, Neotonda, Niopanda, Nuanaga, Pise, Rangalaka, Tou, Tou Barat, Tou Timur |
| Ende | Lepembusu Kelisoke | | Detuara, Kuru, Kurusare (Kuru Sare), Lisekuru (Lise Kuru), Mukureku, Mukureku Sa'ate (Mukureku Sa Ate), Ndenggarongge (Ndengga Rongge), Ndikosapu, Nggumbelaka, Rutujeja (Rutu Jeja), Tanalangi, Taniwoda, Tiwusora, Wologai Timur |
| Ende | Lio Timur | | Bu Tanalagu, Detupera, Fatamari, Hubatuwa/Hobatua, Liabeke, Mbewawora, Nua Lima, Ranggatalo, Tanaroga, Watuneso, Woloaro/Woloara, Wololelea (Wololela A), Wolosambi |
| Ende | Maukaro | | Boafeo, Kamumbheka/Kamubheka, Kebirangga, Kebirangga Selatan, Kebirangga Tengah, Kobaleba, Kolikapa (Kolipaka), Magekapa, Mundinggasa, Nabe, Natanangge |
| Ende | Maurole | | Aewora, Detuwulu (Detuwala), Keliwumbu, Maurole, Mausambi, Ngalukoja, Niranusa, Otogedu, Ranakolo, Ranakolo Selatan (Ranokolo Selatan), Uludala, Watukamba, Woloau |
| Ende | Nangapanda | | Anaraja, Bheramari, Embuzozo, Jegharangga (Jegharonggo), Jemburea, Kekandere, Kerirea, Malawaru, Mbobhenga, Ndeturea, Ndorurea, Ndorurea I, Nggorea, Ondorea, Ondorea Barat, Penggajawa, Raporendu, Rapowawo, Romarea, Sanggarhorho, Tanazozo, Tenda Ondo, Tendambepa, Tendarea, Timbaria, Titwerea, Uzuzozo, Watumite, Zozozea |
| Ende | Ndona | | Kekasewa, Kelikiku, Lokoboko, Manulondo (Manulando), Nanganesa, Ngalupolo, Ngauroga/Ngaluroga, Nila, Onelako, Puutuga, Reka, Wolokota, Wolotolo Timur (Wolotopo Timur), Wolotopo |
| Ende | Ndona Timur | | Demulaka, Kurulimbu, Kurulimbu Selatan, Ngguwa, Roga, Sokoria, Sokoria Selatan |
| Ende | Ndori | | Aebara, Kelisamba, Lungaria, Maubasa, Maubasa Barat, Maubasa Timur, Mole, Ratemangga, Serandori, Wonda |
| Ende | Pulau Ende | | Aejeti, Kazo Kapo, Ndoriwoi, Paderape, Puutara, Redorory (Redodori), Rendoraterua (Rendo Raterua), Renga Menge, Rorurangga (Rendo Ranga) |
| Ende | Wewaria | | Ae Ndoko, Aelipo, Aemuri, Detubela, Ekoae, Ekolea, Fataatu, Fataatu Timur, Kalitembu (Kelitembu), Mautenda, Mautenda Barat, Mbotulaka, Mukusaki, Nuangenda, Numba, Ratewati, Ratewati Selatan, Tanali, Waka, Welamosa, Wewaria, Wolooja |
| Ende | Wolojita | | Nggela, Nuamulu, Pora, Tenda, Wiwipemo, Wolojita |
| Ende | Wolowaru | | Bokasape, Bokasape Timur, Jopu, Likanaka, Lise Pu'u, Lisedetu, Liselowobora (Lise Lowobora), Mbuliloo (Mbuli Loo), Mbuliwaralau, Mbuliwaralau Utara, Nakambara, Niramesi (Niromesi), Nualise, Rindiwawo, Tana Lo'o, Wolokoli, Wolosoko |
| Flores Timur | Adonara | | Adonara, Kolilanang, Kolimasang, Kolipetung, Lamahoda, Nisa Nulan (Nisanulan), Sagu, Tikatukan (Tikatukang) |
| Flores Timur | Adonara Barat | | Bukit Seburi I, Bukit Seburi II, Bungalima (Bugalima), Danibao, Duanur (Duwanur), Homa, Hurung, Ile Pati (Ilepati), Kimakamak (Kima Kamak), Nimun Danibao (Nimun Dani Bao), Pajinian, Riangpadu, Tonuwotan, Waitukan (Wai Tukan), Waiwadan, Watobaya (Wato Baya), Wolokibang, Wureh |
| Flores Timur | Adonara Tengah | | Baya, Bidara, Hoko Horowura, Horowura, Kenotan, Kokotobo, Lewobele, Lewopao, Lite, Nubalema, Nubalema Dua, Oesayang (Oe Sayang), Wewit |
| Flores Timur | Adonara Timur | | Belota, Bilal, Dawataa, Gelong, Ipi Ebang (Ipiebang), Karinglamalouk, Kiwangona (Kiwang Ona), Kwaelaga Lamawato, Lamahala Jaya, Lamalata, Lamatwelu (Lamatewelu), Lelen Bala, Lewobunga, Narasaosina, Puhu, Saosina, Tapobali, Teromh, Tuawolo, Waiburak, Waiwerang Kota |
| Flores Timur | Demon Pagong | | Bama, Blepanawa, Kawalelo, Lamika, Lewokluok, Lewomuda, Watotika Ile |
| Flores Timur | Ile Boleng | | Bayuntaa, Bedalewun, Boleng, Bungalawan, Dokeng, Duablolong, Harubala, Helanlangowuyo, Lamabayung, Lamawolo, Lebanuba, Lewat, Lewokeleng (Lewo Keleng), Lewopao, Neleblolong, Nelelamadike (Nelelamadiken), Nelelamawangi (Nele Lamawangi), Nelelamawangi Dua, Nelereren (Nelerereng), Nobo, Riawale/Rianwale |
| Flores Timur | Ile Bura | | Birawan, Dulipali, Lewoawang, Nobokonga, Nurri, Riang Rita, Riangbura |
| Flores Timur | Ile Mandiri | | Halakodanuan, Lewohala, Lewoloba, Mudakaputu (Mudakeputu), Riangkemie (Riang Kemie), Tiwatobi, Wailolong, Watotutu |
| Flores Timur | Kelubagolit | | Adolaba (Adobala), Hinga, Horinara, Keluwain, Lamapaha, Lambunga (Lamabunga), Mangaaleng, Muda, Nisakarang, Pepakelu (Pepak Kelu), Rodentena (Redontena), Sukutokan |
| Flores Timur | Larantuka | | Amagarapati, Balela, Ekasapta, Lamawalang, Larantuka, Lewolere, Lohayong, Lokea, Mokantarak, Pantai Besar, Pohon Bao, Pohon Sirih, Postoh, Pukentobi Wangin Bao (Puken Tobi Wangi Bao), Sarotari, Sarotari Tengah, Sarotari Timur, Waibalun, Waihali, Weri |
| Flores Timur | Lewolema | | Baluk Herin (Balukhering), Bantala, Ile Padung, Lewobelen, Paingnapang (Painapang), Riangkotek, Sinar Hading |
| Flores Timur | Solor Barat | | Balaweling I, Balaweling II, Daniwato (Dani Wato), Kalelu, Karawatung, Lamaole, Lamawalang (Lamawohong), Lewonama, Lewotanah Ole, Nusadani, Ongalereng, Pamakayo, Ritaebang, Tanah Lein, Titehena |
| Flores Timur | Solor Selatan | | Bubuatagamu (Bubu Atagamu), Kalike / Kelike, Kalike / Kelike Aimatan, Kenere, Lemanu, Lewograran, Sulengwaseng |
| Flores Timur | Solor Timur | | Kwuta (Kawuta), Labelen, Lamawai, Lebao, Lewogeka, Lewohedo, Liwo, Lohayong I, Lohayong II, Menanga, Motonwutun, Tanah Werang, Watanhura, Watanhura II, Watobuku, Watohari, Wulublolong |
| Flores Timur | Tanjung Bunga | | Aransina, Bahinga, Bandona, Gekengderan, Kolaka, Lamanabi, Lamatutu, Latonliwo (Laton Liwo), Latonliwo Dua, Lewobunga, Nusa Nipa (Nusanipa), Patisira Walang (Patisirawalang), Ratulodong (Ratu Lodong), Sinamalaka, Sinarhadigala (Sina Hadigala), Waibao |
| Flores Timur | Titehena | | Adabang, Bokang Wolomatang, Duli Jaya, Dun Tana Lewoingu, Ile Gerong, Kobasoma, Konga, Leraboleng, Lewoingu, Lewolaga, Serinuho, Tenawahang, Tuakepa, Watowara |
| Flores Timur | Witihama | | Balaweling, Balaweling Noten, Baobage, Lamabelawa (Lamablawa), Lamaleka, Lewopulo, Oringbele, Pledo, Riangduli, Sandosi, Tobitika, Tuagoetobi (Tuwagoetobi), Waiwuring, Watololong, Watoone, Weranggere |
| Flores Timur | Wotan Ulumando | | Bliko, Demondei, Kawela, Klukengnuking, Nayubaya, Oyangbarang, Pandai, Samsoge, Tana Tukan, Tobilota, Wailebe, Wotanulumado |
| Flores Timur | Wulanggitang | | Boru, Boru Kedang, Hewa, Hokeng Jaya, Klatanlo, Nawokote, Nileknoheng, Ojandetun, Pantai Oa, Pululera, Waiula |
| Kupang | Alak | | Alak, Batu Plat (Batuplat), Fatufeto, Mantasi, Manulai II, Manutapen, Naioni, Namosain, Nunbaun Delha, Nunbaun Sabu, Nunhila, Penkase Oeleta |
| Kupang | Amabi Oefeto | | Fatukanutu (Fatuknutu), Fatuteta, Kairane, Kuanheun (Kuanheum), Niunbaun, Oeleto (Oefeto), Raknamo |
| Kupang | Amabi Oefeto Timur | | Enolanan, Muke, Nunmafo, Oemofa, Oemolo, Oenaunu, Oeniko, Oenuntono (Oenunutono), Pathau, Seki |
| Kupang | Amarasi | | Apren, Kotabes, Nonbes, Oenoni, Oenoni II (Oenoni dua), Oesena, Ponain, Tesbatan, Tesbatan II |
| Kupang | Amarasi Barat | | Erbaun, Merbaun, Nekbaun, Niukbaun, Soba, Teunbaun, Toobaun, Tunbaun |
| Kupang | Amarasi Selatan | | Buraen, Nekmese, Retraen, Sahraen, Sonraen |
| Kupang | Amarasi Timur | | Enoraen, Oebesi, Pakubaun, Rabeka |
| Kupang | Amfoang Barat Daya | | Bioba Baru (Barutaen), Letkole, Manubelon, Nefoneut |
| Kupang | Amfoang Barat Laut | | Faumes, Honuk, Oelfatu, Saukibe, Soliu, Timau |
| Kupang | Amfoang Selatan | | Fatumetan, Fatusuki, Leloboko, Lelogama, Oelbanu, Oh'aem (Ohaem), Oh'aem II (Ohaem Dua) |
| Kupang | Amfoang Tengah | | Binafun, Bitobe, Bonmuti, Fatumonas |
| Kupang | Amfoang Timur | | Kifu, Netemnanu (Natemnanu / Natummanu), Netemnanu Selatan, Netemnanu Utara, Nunuanah |
| Kupang | Amfoang Utara | | Afoan, Bakuin, Fatunaus, Kolabe, Lilmus, Naikliu |
| Kupang | Fatuleu | | Camplong I, Camplong II, Ekateta, Kiuoni, Kuimasi, Naunnu (Naunu), Oebola, Oebola Dalam, Sillu, Tolnaku (Tulnaku) |
| Kupang | Fatuleu Barat | | Kalali, Naitae, Nuataus, Poto, Tuakau |
| Kupang | Fatuleu Tengah | | Nonbaun, Nunsaen, Oelbiteno, Passi |
| Kupang | Kelapa Lima | | Kelapa Lima, Lasiana, Oesapa, Oesapa Barat, Oesapa Selatan |
| Kupang | Kota Lama | | Airmata (Air Mata), Bonipoi, Fatubesi, Lai Lai Bisi Kopan, Merdeka, Nefonaek, Oeba, Pasir Panjang, Solor, Tode Kisar |
| Kupang | Kota Raja | | Airnona (Air Nona), Bakunase, Bakunase Dua, Fontein, Kuanino, Naikoten I (Satu), Naikoten II (Dua), Nunleu |
| Kupang | Kupang Barat | | Batakte, Bolok, Kuanheun, Lifuleo, Manulai I, Nitneo, Oematnunu (Oematanunu), Oenaek, Oenesu, Sumlili, Tablolong, Tesabela |
| Kupang | Kupang Tengah | | Mata Air, Noelbaki, Oebelo, Oelnasi, Oelpuah, Penfui Timur, Tanah Merah, Tarus |
| Kupang | Kupang Timur | | Babau, Manusak, Merdeka, Naibonat, Nunkurus, Oefafi, Oelatimo, Oesao, Oesao (Kelurahan Oesao), Pukdale, Tanah Putih, Tuapukan, Tuatuka |
| Kupang | Maulafa | | Bello, Fatukoa, Kolhua, Maulafa, Naikolan, Naimata, Oepura, Penfui, Sikumana |
| Kupang | Nekamese | | Bismark (Bismarak), Bone, Oben, Oelomin, Oemasi, Oenif, Oepaha, Taloitan (Taloetan), Tasikona, Tunfeu, Usapi Sonbai (Usapisonbai) |
| Kupang | Oebobo | | Fatululi, Kayu Putih, Liliba, Oebobo, Oebufu, Oetete, Tuak Daun Merah |
| Kupang | Semau | | Batuinan, Bokonusan, Hansisi, Huilelot, Letbaun, Otan, Uiasa, Uitao |
| Kupang | Semau Selatan | | Akle, Naiken (Naikean), Onansila (Oenansila), Uiboa, Uitiuh Ana, Uitiuh Tuan |
| Kupang | Sulamu | | Bipolo, Oeteta, Pantai Beringin, Pantulan, Pariti, Pitai, Sulamu |
| Kupang | Taebenu | | Baumata, Baumata Barat, Baumata Timur, Baumata Utara, Bokong, Kuaklalo, Oeletsala, Oeltuah (Oeltua) |
| Kupang | Takari | | Benu, Fatukona, Hueknutu, Kauniki, Noelmina, Oelnaineno, Oesusu, Takari, Tanini, Tuapanaf |
| Lembata | Atadei | | Atakera (Atakore), Dori Pewut, Dulir, Ile Kerbau, Ile Kimok, Katakeja, Lebaata, Lerek, Lewogroma, Lusilame, Nogo Doni, Nuba Atalojo, Nubaboli, Nubahaeraka, Tubukrajan (Tubuk Rajan) |
| Lembata | Buyasuri | | Atu Wa'lupang, Atulaleng, Bareng, Bean, Benihading I, Benihading II, Buriwutung, Kalikur, Kalikur WL, Kaohua, Leuburi, Leuwohung, Loyobohor, Mampir, Panama, Roho, Rumang, Tobotani, Tubung Walang, Umaleu |
| Lembata | Ile Ape | | Amakaka, Beutaran, Bungamuda, Dulitukan, Kolipadan, Kolontobo, Lamawara, Laranwutun, Muruona, Napasabok, Palilolon, Petuntawa, Riangbao, Tagawiti, Tanjung Batu, Waowala, Watodiri |
| Lembata | Ile Ape Timur | | Aulesa, Bao Lali Duli, Jontona, Lamaau, Lamagute, Lamatokan, Lamawolo, Todanara, Waimatan |
| Lembata | Lebatukan | | Atakowa, Banitobo, Baopama (Baopana), Belorebong (Balurebong), Dikesare, Hadakewa, Lamadale, Lamalela, Lamatuka, Lerahinga, Lewoeleng, Lodotodokowa, Merdeka, Seranggorang, Tapobarang (Tapobaran), Tapolangu, Waienga |
| Lembata | Naga Wutung | | Atawai, Babokerong, Baobolak, Belobaja, Boli Bean, Duawutun, Idalolong, Ileboli, Labalimut, Liwulagang, Lolong, Lusiduawutun, Pasir Putih, Penikenek, Ria Bao, Tewaowutung, Warawatung, Wuakoreng |
| Lembata | Nubatukan | | Bakalerek, Baolangu, Belobatang, Bour, Lewoleba, Lewoleba Barat, Lewoleba Selatan, Lewoleba Tengah, Lewoleba Timur, Lewoleba Utara, Lite Ulu Mado, Nubamado, Pada, Paubokol, Selandoro, Udak Melomata, Waijarang, Watokobu |
| Lembata | Omesuri | | Aramengi, Balauring, Dolulolong, Hingalamamengi, Hoelea I, Hoelea II, Lebewala, Leubatang, Leudanung, Leuwayang, Mahal I, Mahal II, Meluwiting, Meluwiting I, Nilanapo, Normal, Normal I, Peusawa, Roma, Wailolong, Walang Sawah, Wowong |
| Lembata | Wulandoni | | Alap Atadei, Ataili, Atakera, Belobao, Imu Lolong (Imulolong), Lamalera A, Lamalera B, Lelata, Leworaja, Pantai Harapan, Posiwatu, Puor, Puor B, Tapobali, Wulandoni |
| Malaka | Botin Leobele | | Babotin, Babotin Maemina, Babotin Selatan, Kereana, Takarai |
| Malaka | Io Kufeu | | Bani-Bani, Biau, Fatoin, Ikan Tuanbeis, Kufeu, Tunabesi, Tunmat |
| Malaka | Kobalima | | Babulu, Babulu Selatan, Lakekun, Lakekun Barat, Lakekun Utara, Litamali, Rainawe, Sisi |
| Malaka | Kobalima Timur | | Alas, Alas Selatan, Alas Utara, Kotabiru |
| Malaka | Laenmanen | | Bisesmus, Boni Bais, Kapitan Meo, Meotroi, Nauke Kusa, Oenaek, Tesa, Tniumanu, Uabau |
| Malaka | Malaka Barat | | Besikama, Fafoe, Lasaen, Loofoun, Maktihan, Motaain, Motaulun, Naas, Oan Mane, Rabasa, Rabasa Haerain, Rabasahain, Raimataus, Sikun, Umalor, Umatoos |
| Malaka | Malaka Tengah | | Bakiruk, Barada, Barene, Bereliku, Fahiluka, Harekakae, Kakaniuk, Kamanasa, Kateri, Kletek, Lawalu, Naimana, Railor Tahak, Suai, Umakatahan, Umanen Lawalu, Wehali |
| Malaka | Malaka Timur | | Dirma, Kusa, Numponi, Raiulun, Sanleo, Wemeda |
| Malaka | Rinhat | | Alala, Biudukfoho, Boen, Lotas, Muke, Nabutaek, Naet, Naiusu, Nanebot, Nanin, Niti, Oekmurak, Raisamane, Saenama, Tafuli, Tafuli I, Weain, Webetun, Wekeke, Wekmidar |
| Malaka | Sasitamean | | As Manulea, Beaneno, Builaran, Fatuaruin, Manulea, Manumutin Silole, Naibone, Naisau, Umutnana |
| Malaka | Weliman | | Angkaes, Bonetasea, Forekmodok, Haitimuk, Haliklaran, Kleseleon, Lakulo, Laleten, Lamudur, Leunklot, Taaba, Umalawain, Wederok, Wesey |
| Malaka | Wewiku | | Alkani, Badarai, Biris, Halibasar, Lamea, Lorotolus, Rabasa Biris, Seserai, Webriamata, Weoe, Weseben, Weulun |
| Manggarai | Cibal | | Barang, Bea Mese, Gapong, Golo, Golo Ncuang, Kentol, Ladur, Lando, Langkas, Nenu, Pagal, Perak, Pinggang, Rado, Riung, Welu, Wudi |
| Manggarai | Cibal Barat | | Bangka Ara, Bere, Compang Cibal, Golo Lanak, Golo Woi, Latung, Lenda, Timbu, Wae Codi, Wae Renca |
| Manggarai | Langke Rembong | | Bangka Leda, Bangka Nekang, Carep, Compang Carep, Compang Tuke, Golo Dukal, Karot, Laci Carep, Lawir, Mbaumuku (Mbau Muku), Pau, Pitak, Poco Mal, Rowang, Satar Tacik, Tadong, Tenda, Wali, Waso, Watu |
| Manggarai | Lelak | | Bangka Dese, Bangka Lelak, Bangka Tonggur, Gelong, Ketang, Lentang, Nati, Ndiwar, Pong Umpu (Pong Ompu), Urang |
| Manggarai | Rahong Utara | | Bangka Ajang, Bangka Ruang, Benteng Tubi, Buar, Compang Dari, Dimpong, Golo Langkok, Liang Bua, Manong, Pong Lengor, Tengku Lese, Wae Mantang |
| Manggarai | Reok | | Bajak, Baru, Mata Air, Reo, Robek, Ruis, Salama, Wangkung, Watu Baur, Watu Tango |
| Manggarai | Reok Barat | | Kajong (Wae Kajong), Lante, Lemarang, Loce, Nggalak, Para Lando, Rura, Sambi, Toe, Torong Koe |
| Manggarai | Ruteng | | Bangka Lao, Bea Kakor (Beokakor), Belang Turi, Benteng Kuwu, Beo Rahong, Bulan, Compang Dalo, Compang Namut, Cumbi, Golo Worok, Kakor, Meler, Poco Likang (Poco Liking), Pong Lale, Pong Lao, Pong Leko, Pong Murung, Rai, Wae Belang |
| Manggarai | Satar Mese | | Gara, Golo Lambo, Golo Muntas, Iteng, Jaong, Koak, Langgo, Legu, Lolang, Lungar, Mocok, Ngkaer, Paka, Papang, Ponggeok, Pongkor, Satar Loung, Tado, Tal, Ulu Belang, Umung, Wae Ajang, Wewo |
| Manggarai | Satar Mese Barat | | Bea Kondo, Borik, Cambir Leca, Ceka Luju, Golo Ropong, Hilihintir, Nuca Molas, Satar Lenda, Satar Luju, Satar Ruwuk, Terong, Wongka |
| Manggarai | Satar Mese Utara | | Cireng, Gulung, Kole, Lia, Ling, Mata Wae, Nao, Popo, Renda, Ruang, Todo |
| Manggarai | Wae Rii | | Bangka Jong (Bangkajong), Bangka Kenda, Benteng Poco, Compang Ndehes, Golo Cador, Golo Mendo, Golo Watu/Wutu, Golo Wua (Golo Wuas), Lalong, Longko, Ndehes, Poco, Ranaka/Renaka, Ranggi, Satar Ngkeling, Wae Mulu, Wae Rii |
| Manggarai Barat | Boleng | | Batu Tiga, Beo Sepang, Golo Ketak, Golo Lujang, Golo Nobo, Golo Sepang, Mbuit, Pontianak, Pota Wangka, Sepang, Tanjung Boleng |
| Manggarai Barat | Komodo | | Batu Cermin, Compang Longgo, Golo Bilas, Golo Mori, Golo Pongkor, Gorontalo, Komodo, Labuan Bajo, Macang Tanggar, Nggorang, Pantar, Papa Garang, Pasir Panjang, Pasir Putih, Seraya Marannu, Tiwu Nampar, Wae Kelambu, Warloka, Watu Nggelek |
| Manggarai Barat | Kuwus | | Bangka Lewat, Benteng Suru, Coal, Compang Suka, Golo Pua, Golo Ru'u, Lawi, Lewur, Nantal, Pangga, Sama, Suka Kiong |
| Manggarai Barat | Kuwus Barat | | Compang Kules, Golo Lewe, Golo Riwu, Golo Wedong, Kolang, Ranggu, Sompang Kolang, Tengku, Tueng, Wajur |
| Manggarai Barat | Lembor | | Daleng, Golo Ndeweng, LIang Sola, Ngancar, Poco Dedeng, Poco Rutang, Pondo, Pong Majok, Ponto Ara, Siru, Tangge, Wae Bangka, Wae Kanta, Wae Mowol, Wae Wako |
| Manggarai Barat | Lembor Selatan | | Benteng Dewa, Benteng Tado, Kakor, Lalong, Lendong, Modo, Munting, Nanga Bere, Nanga Lili, Repi, Surunumbeng, Wae Mose, Watu Rambung, Watu Tiri, Watu Waja |
| Manggarai Barat | Macang Pacar | | Bari, Lewat, Mbakung, Nanga Kantor, Nanga Kantor Barat, Nggilat, Raba, Rego, Rokap, Sarae Naru, Watu Manggar, Watubaru, Wontong |
| Manggarai Barat | Mbeliling | | Compang Liang Ndara, Cunca Lolos, Cunca Wulang, Golo Damu, Golo Desat, Golo Ndoal, Golo Sembea, Golo Tantong, Kempo, Liang Ndara, Tandong Belang, Tiwi Riwung, Wae Jare, Watu Galang, Watu Wangka |
| Manggarai Barat | Ndoso | | Golo Bore, Golo Keli, Golo Poleng, Golo Ru'a, Kasong, Lumut, Momol, Ndoso, Pateng Lesuh, Pong Narang, Raka, Tehong, Tentang, Wae Buka, Waning |
| Manggarai Barat | Pacar | | Benteng Ndope, Compang, Golo Lajang, Golo Lajang Barat, Kombo, Kombo Selatan, Kombo Tengah, Loha, Manong, Pacar, Pong Kolong, Romang, Waka |
| Manggarai Barat | Sano Nggoang | | Golo Kempo, Golo Kondeng, Golo Leleng, Golo Manting, Golo Mbu, Golo Ndaring, Golo Sengang, Matawae, Nampar Macing, Poco Golo Kempo, Pulau Nuncung, Sano Nggoang, Wae Lolos, Wae Sano, Watu Panggal |
| Manggarai Barat | Welak | | Dunta, Galang, Golo Ndari, Golo Ronggot, Gurung, Lale, Orong, Pengka, Pong Welak, Racang Welak, Rehak, Robo, Semang, Sewar, Watu Umpu, Wewa |
| Manggarai Timur | Borong | | Balus Permai, Bangka Kantar, Benteng Raja, Benteng Riwu, Compang Ndejing, Compang Tenda, Golo Kantar, Golo Lalong, Golo Leda, Gurung Liwut, Kota Ndora, Nanga Labang, Ngampang Mas, Poco Rii, Rana Loba, Rana Masak, Satar Peot, Waling |
| Manggarai Timur | Elar | | Biting, Compang Soba, Compang Teo, Golo Lebo, Golo Lijun, Golo Munde, Haju Ngendong, Kaju Wangi, Legur Lai, Lengko Namut, Rana Gapang, Rana Kulan, Sisir, Tiwu Kondo, Wae Lokom |
| Manggarai Timur | Elar Selatan | | Benteng Pau, Gising, Golo Linus, Golo Wuas, Langga Sai, Lempang Paji, Mosi Ngaran, Nanga Meje, Nanga Puun, Paan Waru, Sangan Kalo, Sipi, Teno Mese, Wae Rasan |
| Manggarai Timur | Kota Komba | | Bamo, Golo Meni (Golomeni), Golo Ndele, Golo Nderu, Golo Tolang, Gunung (Gunung Mute), Gunung Baru, Komba, Lembur, Mbengan, Mokel, Mokel Morid, Paan Leleng, Pari, Pong Ruan, Rana Kolong, Rana Mbata, Rana Mbeling, Rongga Koe, Ruan, Tanah Rata, Watu Nggene |
| Manggarai Timur | Lamba Leda | | Compang Deru, Compang Mekar, Compang Necak, Golo Lembur, Golo Mangung, Golo Munga, Golo Munga Barat, Golo Nimbung, Golo Paleng, Golo Rentung, Golo Wontong, Goreng Meni, Goreng Meni Utara, Haju Wangi, Keli, Lencur, Liang Deruk, Nampar Tabang, Satar Kampas, Satar Padut, Satar Punda, Satar Punda Barat, Tengku Lawar (Tengkulawar), Tengku Leda |
| Manggarai Timur | Poco Ranaka | | Bangka Kuleng, Bangka Leleng, Bangka Pau, Bea Waek, Compang Laho, Compang Weluk, Compang Wesang, Deno, Golo Lobos, Golo Ndari, Golo Nderu, Golo Rengket, Golo Wune, Gurung Turi, Lenang, Lento, Leong, Mandosawu (Mando Sawu), Melo, Nggalak Leleng, Poco Lia, Pocong, Satar Tesem, Watu Lanur |
| Manggarai Timur | Poco Ranaka Timur | | Arus, Bangka Arus, Benteng Rampas, Benteng Wunis, Colol, Compang Raci, Compang Wunis, Golo Lero, Ngkiong Dora, Rende Nao, Rengkam, Tango Molas, Ulu Wae, Urung Dora, Wangkar Weli, Watu Arus, Wejang Mali, Wejang Mawe |
| Manggarai Timur | Rana Mese | | Bangka Kempo, Bangka Masa, Bea Ngencung, Compang Kantar, Compang Kempo, Compang Loni, Compang Teber, Golo Loni, Golo Meleng, Golo Ros, Golo Rutuk, Lalang, Lidi, Rondo Woing, Sano Lokom/Lokon, Satar Lahing, Satar Lenda, Sita, Torok Golo, Wae Nggori, Watu Mori |
| Manggarai Timur | Sambi Rampas | | Buti, Compang Congkar, Compang Lawi, Golo Ngawan, Golo Pari, Golo Wangkung, Golo Wangkung Barat, Golo Wangkung Utara, Kembang Mekar, Lada Mese, Nampar Sepang, Nanga Baras, Nanga Baur (Nanga Mbaur), Nanga Mbaling, Pota, Rana Mese, Satar Nawang, Ulung Baras, Wea, Wela Lada |
| Nagekeo | Aesesa | | Aerama (Aeramo), Danga, Dhawe, Labolewa, Lape, Marapokot, Mbay I, Mbay II, Nangadhero, Ngegedhawe, Nggolombay (Nggolo Mbay), Nggolonio, Olaia, Tadakisa (Tedakisa), Tedamude, Tonggurambang (Tonggu Rambang), Towak, Waekokak |
| Nagekeo | Aesesa Selatan | | Langedhawe, Rendubutowe (Rendu Butowe), Rendut Tutubhada, Renduteno (Rendutenoe), Renduwawo, Tengatiba, Wajomara |
| Nagekeo | Boawae | | Alorawe, Dhereisa, Focolodorawe, Gerodhere, Kelewae, Kelimado, Legederu (Leguderu), Mulakoli, Nageoga, Nagerawe, Nagesapadhi, Natanage, Natanage Timur, Olakile, Raja, Raja Selatan, Raja Timur, Ratongamobo, Rega, Rigi, Rowa, Solo, Wea Au, Wolopogo, Wolowea, Wolowea Barat, Wolowea Timur |
| Nagekeo | Keo Tengah | | Keli, Kotodirumali (Kotadirumali), Kotowuji Barat (Kotawuji Barat), Kotowuji Timur (Kotawuji Timur), Ladolima, Ladolima Timur, Ladolima Utara (Ladolima Barat), Lewangera, Mbaenuamuri, Ngera, Paumali, Pautola, Udiworowatu, Wajo, Wajo Timur, Witurombaua |
| Nagekeo | Mauponggo | | Aewoe, Bela, Jawapogo, Keliwatulewa, Kotagana, Lajawajo, Lodaolo, Lokalaba, Maukeli, Mauponggo (Mau Ponggo), Salalejo (Selalejo), Sawu, Selalejo Timur, Ua, Ululoga, Woewolo, Woloede, Wolokisa, Wololelu, Wolotelu, Wuliwalo |
| Nagekeo | Nangaroro | | Bidoa, Degalea, Kodaute, Kotakeo, Kotakeo Dua, Kotakeo Satu, Nangaroro, Nataute, Pagomogo, Podenura, Riti, Tonggo, Ulupulu, Ulupulu I, Utetoto, Woedoa, Woewutu, Wokodekororo, Wokowoe |
| Nagekeo | Wolowae | | Anakoli, Natatoto, Tendakinde (Tenda Kinde), Tendatoto, Totomala |
| Ngada | Aimere | | Aimere, Aimere Timur, Binawali, F O A (Foa), Heawea, Keligejo, Kila, Legelapu, Lekogoko / Lekogoku, Waesae |
| Ngada | Bajawa | | Bajawa, Beiwali, Beja, Bela, Bomari, Borani, Bowali, Faobata, Jawameze, Kisanata, Langagedha, Lebijaga, Naru (Natu), Ngedukelu, Ngoranale, Pape, Susu, Tanalodu, Trikora, Ubedolumolo, Ubedolumolo Satu, Wawowae |
| Ngada | Bajawa Utara | | Genamere, Inegena, Inelika, Nabelena, Tura Muri, Uluwae, Uluwae I, Uluwae II, Waewea, Watukapu, Wololika |
| Ngada | Golewa | | Dadawea, Ekoroka (Eko Roka), Malanuza, Malanuza Satu (Malanuza I), Mataloko, Radabata, Ratogesa, Sangadeto, Sarasedu, Sarasedu Satu (Sarasedu I), Todabelu, Ulu Belu (Ulubelu), Wae La (Wae Ia), Were, Were I, Were IV |
| Ngada | Golewa Barat | | Bewapawe (Bea Pawe), Dizi gedha, Mangulewa, Rakalaba, Rakateda Dua (Rakateda II), Rakateda Satu (Rakateda I), Sobo, Sobo Satu (Sobo I), Turekisa, Watunay |
| Ngada | Golewa Selatan | | Bawarani, Boba, Boba Satu (Boba I), Kezewea, Nirmala, Radamasa, Sadha, Takatunga, Watu Sipi (Watusipi), Were Dua (Were II), Were Tiga (Were III), Wogowela (Wagowela) |
| Ngada | Inerie | | Inerie, Kelitei / Kelitey, Legeriwu (Legariwu), Manubhara, Paupaga, Sebowuli, Tiwurana, Waebela, Warupele Dua (Warupele II), Warupele Satu (Warupele I) |
| Ngada | Jerebuu | | Batajawa, Dariwali, Dariwali I (Manubhara), Naruwolo, Naruwolo I, Naruwolo II, Nenowea, Nio Lewa, Tiworiwu, Tiworiwu I, Tiworiwu II, Watumanu |
| Ngada | Riung | | Benteng Tengah, Latung, Lengkosambi, Lengkosambi Barat, Lengkosambi Timur, Lengkosambi Utara, Nangamese, Rawangkalo, Sambinasi, Sambinasi Barat, Tadho, Taen Terong Dua, Taen Terong Satu, Taenterong (Taen Terong), Wangka, Wangka Selatan |
| Ngada | Riung Barat | | Benteng Tawa, Benteng Tawa I, Lanamai, Lanamai I, Ngara, Ria, Ria I, Wolomese Dua, Wolomeze, Wolomeze I |
| Ngada | Soa | | Bogoboa, Libunio, Loa, Mangeruda (Mengeruda), Masu Kedhi, Masumeli (Masu), Meli Waru, Ngabheo, Piga, Piga Satu (Piga I), Seso, Tarawaja, Tarawali, Waepana |
| Ngada | Wolomeze (Riung Selatan) | | Denatana, Denatana Timur, Mainai, Nginamanu, Nginamanu Barat, Nginamanu Selatan, Turaloa, Wue |
| Rote Ndao | Landu Leko | | Bolatena, Daeurendale, Daiama, Lifuleo, Pukuafu, Sotimori, Tena Lai |
| Rote Ndao | Lobalain | | Baadale, Bebalain, Helebeik, Holoama, Kolobolon, Kuli, Kuli Aisele, Lekunik, Loleoen, Metina, Mokdale, Namodale, Oeleka, Oelunggu, Oematamboli, Sanggaoen, Suelain, Tuanatuk |
| Rote Ndao | Ndao Nuse | | Anarae, Mbali Lendeiki, Mbiu Lombo, Ndaonuse, Nuse |
| Rote Ndao | Pantai Baru | | Batulilok, Edalode, Fatelilo, Keoen, Lekona, Lenupetu, Nusakdale, Oebau, Oeledo, Oenggae, Ofalangga, Olafulihaa, Sonimanu, Tesa Bela (Tesabela), Tungganamo (Tunganamo) |
| Rote Ndao | Rote Barat | | Bo'a (Boa), Mbueain, Nemberala, Oelolok (Oelolot), Oenggaut, Oenitas, Sedeoen |
| Rote Ndao | Rote Barat Daya | | Batutua, Dalek Esa, Dolasi, Fuafuni, Lalukoen, Landu, Lekik, Lentera, Mbokak, Meoain, Oebafok (Oebaffok), Oebatu, Oebou, Oehandi, Oelasin, Oeseli, Oetefu (Oeteffu), Sakubatun, Sanggandolu |
| Rote Ndao | Rote Barat Laut | | Balaoli, Boni, Busalangga, Busalangga Barat, Busalangga Timur, Daudolu, Holulai, Hundihuk, Ingguinak, Lidor, Modosinal, Mundek, Netenaen, Oebela, Oebole, Oelua, Oetutulu, Saindule, Tasilo, Temas, Tolama, Tualima |
| Rote Ndao | Rote Selatan | | Daleholu, Dodaek, Inaoe, Lenguselu, Nggelodae, Pilasue, Tebole |
| Rote Ndao | Rote Tengah | | Lidabesi, Lidamanu, Limakoli, Maubesi, Nggodimeda, Onatali (Onotali), Siomeda, Suebela |
| Rote Ndao | Rote Timur | | Batefalu, Faifua, Hundihopo (Hundi Hopo), Lakamola, Londalusi, Matanae, Matasio, Mukekuku, Papela, Pengodua, Serubeba |
| Sabu Raijua | Hawu Mehara | | Daieko, Gurimonearu, Ledeae, Lederaga, Lobohede, Molie (Mole), Pedarro (Pedaro), Raemadia (Ramedue), Tanajawa, Wadumaddi (Wadumedi / Wadumeddi) |
| Sabu Raijua | Raijua | | Ballu, Bolua, Kolorae, Ledeke, Ledeunu |
| Sabu Raijua | Sabu Barat | | Delo, Depe, Djadu, Ledeana, Ledekepaka, Mebba, Menia, Naawawi, Raedewa, Raekore, Raeloro, Raemadia, Raemude, Raenalulu, Raenyale, Roboaba, Teriwu, Titinalede |
| Sabu Raijua | Sabu Liae | | Dainao, Deme, Eikare, Eilogo, Halla Paji (Halapadji), Kotahawu, Ledeke, Ledetalo (Lede Talo), Loborui (Loboroi), Mehona, Raerobo, Waduwalla (Waduwala) |
| Sabu Raijua | Sabu Tengah | | Bebae, Eilode, Eimadake (Eimmadake), Eimau, Jiwuwu, Loboaju, Matei, Tada |
| Sabu Raijua | Sabu Timur | | Bodae, Bolou, Eiada, Huwaga, Keduru, Keliha, Kuji Ratu (Kujiratu), Limagu (Limaggu), Lobodei, Loborai |
| Sikka | Alok | | Gunung Sari, Kabor, Kota Uneng, Madawat, Nangalimang, Pemana, Samparong |
| Sikka | Alok Barat | | Hewuli, Wailiti, Wolomarang, Wuring |
| Sikka | Alok Timur | | Beru, Koja Doi (Kojadoi), Kojagete, Kota Baru, Lepo Lima (Lepolima), Nangameting, Perumaan (Parumaan), Waioti, Wairotang, Watugong |
| Sikka | Bola | | Bola, Hokor, Ipir, Umauta, Wolokoli, Wolonwalu |
| Sikka | Doreng | | Kloangpopot, Nenbura, Waihawa, Watumerak, Wogalirit, Wolomotong, Wolonterang |
| Sikka | Hewokloang | | Baomekot, Heopuat, Hewokloang, Kajowair, Munerana, Rubit, Wolomapa |
| Sikka | Kangae | | Balatatatin (Blatatatin), Habi, Kokowahor, Langir, Mekendetung, Tana Duen (Tanaduen), Teka Iku (Tekaiku), Watuliwung, Watumilok |
| Sikka | Kewapante | | Geliting, Iantena (Ian Tena), Kopong, Namangkewa, Seusina, Umagera, Waiara, Wairkoja |
| Sikka | Koting | | Koting A, Koting B, Koting C, Koting D, Paubekor, Ribang |
| Sikka | Lela | | Baopaat, Du, Hepang, Iligai, Kolidetung, Korowuwu, Lela, Sikka, Watutedang |
| Sikka | Magepanda | | Done, Kolisia, Kolisia B, Magepanda, Reroroja |
| Sikka | Mapitara | | Egon Gahar, Hale, Hebing, Natakoli |
| Sikka | Mego | | Bhera, Dobo, Dobo Nuapuu (Dobo Nua Puu), Gera, Korobhera, Kowi, Liakutu, Napugera (Napu Gera), Parabubu, Wolodhesa |
| Sikka | Nelle (Maumerei) | | Manubura, Nella Lorang (Nelle Lorang), Nelle Barat, Nelle Urung, Nelle Wutung |
| Sikka | Nita | | Bloro, Ladogahar, Lusitada, Mahebora, Nirangkliung, Nita, Nitakloang, Riit, Takaplager, Tebuk, Tilang, Wuliwutik |
| Sikka | Paga | | Lenandareta, Masabewa (Masebewa), Mauloo, Mbengu, Paga, Wolorega, Wolowiro, Wolowona |
| Sikka | Palue | | Kesokoja, Ladolaka, Lidi, Maluriwu, Nitunglea, Reruwairere, Rokirole, Tuanggeo |
| Sikka | Talibura | | Bangkoor (Baang Koor), Darat Gunung, Darat Pantai, Hikong, Kringa, Lewomada, Nangahale, Nebe, Ojang, Talibura, Timutawa, Wailamung |
| Sikka | Tana Wawo | | Bu Selatan, Bu Utara, Bu Watuweti, Detubinga, Loke, Poma, Renggarasi, Tuwa |
| Sikka | Waiblama | | Ilinmedo, Natarmage, Pruda, Tanarawa, Tua Bao, Werang |
| Sikka | Waigete | | Aibura, Egon, Hoder, Nangatobong, Pogon, Runut, Wairbleler, Wairterang, Watudiran |
| Sumba Barat | Kota Waikabubak | | Kalembu Kuni, Kampung Baru, Kampung Sawah, Kodaka, Komerda, Lapale, Maliti, Modu Waimaringu, Pada Eweta, Puu Mawo, Soba Rade, Tebara, Wailiang |
| Sumba Barat | Laboya Barat (Lamboya Barat) | | Gaura, Harona Kalla (Harona Kala), Patiala Dete, Wee Tana |
| Sumba Barat | Lamboya | | Bodo Hula, Kabu Karudi, Laboya Dete, Lamboya Bawah (Laboya Bawa), Pala Moko, Patiala Bawa, Rajak (Rajaka), Ringu Rara, Sodan (Sodana), Wailibo (Welibo), Watu Karere |
| Sumba Barat | Loli | | Bali Ledo, Bera Dolu, Dedekadu (Dede Kadu), Dira Tana, Doka Kaka, Loda Pare, Manola, Sobawawi (Soba Wawi), Tana Rara, Tema Tana, Ubu Pede, Ubu Raya, Wee Dabo, Wee Karou |
| Sumba Barat | Tana Righu | | Bondo Tera, Elu Loda, Kalebu Ana Kaka, Karaka Nduku (Kareka Nduku), Kareka Nduku Selatan, Kareka Nduku Utara, Lingu Lango, Loko Ri (Ry), Lolo Tana, Lolo Wano, Malata, Manu Kuku, Manu Mada (Manu Mada Pemekaran), Ngadu Pada, Tarona, Wano Kasa (Wanokaza), Wee Patola, Zala Kadu |
| Sumba Barat | Wanokaka | | Ana Wolu, Bali Loku, Hoba Wawi, Hupu Mada, Katiku Loku, Mamodu, Pahola, Pari Rara, Praibakul (Prai Bakul), Rewa Rara, Rua, Tara Manu, Waihura (Wai Hura), Wei Mangoma |
| Sumba Barat Daya | Kodi | | Ana Engge, Ana Kaka, Ate Dalo, Bondo Kodi, Hamonggo Lele, Homba Rande, Homba Rica, Kadoki Horo, Kapaka Madeta, Kawango Hari, Koki, Mali lha (Mali Iha), Ole Ate, Onggol, Pero Batang, Pero Konda, Tanjung Karoso, Watu Wona, Wura Homba |
| Sumba Barat Daya | Kodi Balaghar | | Kahale, Loko Tali, Panenggo Ede, Waiha, Waikarara, Wailangira, Wainyapu, Waipakolo |
| Sumba Barat Daya | Kodi Bangedo | | Ana Goka (Ana Gogka), Ana Lewe, Bondo Balla, Delu Depa, Dinjo, Karang Indah, Lete Loko, Maliti Bondo Ate, Manu Toghi, Mata Kapore, Mere Kehe, Rada Loko, Rada Malando, Tana Mete, Umbu Ngedo, Waikadada, Waikaninyo, Waimakaha (Waimahaka), Waimaringi, Waipaddi, Walla Ndimu |
| Sumba Barat Daya | Kodi Utara | | Bila Cenge, Bukambero, Hameli Ate, Hoha Wungo, Homba Karipit, Homba Pare, Kadaghu Tana, Kadu Eta, Kalena Rongo, Kendu Wela (Kandu Wela), Kori, Limbu Kembe, Magho Linyo, Mangganipi, Moro Manduyo, Nangga Mutu, Noha, Waiholo, Wailabubur, Waitaru, Wee Wella |
| Sumba Barat Daya | Kota Tambolaka | | Kadi Pada, Kalembu Kaha, Kalena Wano, Langga Lero, Rada Mata, Waitabula, Watu Kawula, Wee Londa, Wee Pangali, Wee Rena |
| Sumba Barat Daya | Loura | | Bondo Boghila, Karuni, Lete Konda, Lete Konda Selatan, Loko Kalada, Payola Umbu, Pogo Tena, Rama Dana, Totok, Wee Kambala, Wee Mananda |
| Sumba Barat Daya | Wewewa Barat | | Kabali Dana, Kalaki Kambe, Kalembu Kanaika, Kalembu Weri, Kalimbu Tillu (Kalimbu Tilu), Laga Lete, Lolo Ole, Lua Koba, Marokota, Menne Ate, Pero, Raba Ege, Reda Pada, Sangu Ate, Tawo Rara, Waimangura, Wali Ate, Watu Labara, Wee Kombaka, Wee Kura |
| Sumba Barat Daya | Wewewa Selatan | | Bondo Bela, Bondo Ukka, Buru Deilo, Buru Kaghu, Delo, Denduka, Mandungo, Milla Ate, Rita Baru, Tena Teke, Umbu Wangu, Wee Baghe, Wee Wulla, Weri Lolo |
| Sumba Barat Daya | Wewewa Tengah | | Bolora, Bondo Delo, Eka Pata, Gollu Sapi, Kadi Roma, Kalingara, Kanelu, Kiku Booko, Lete Wungana, Limbu Watu, Lombu, Mata Lombu, Mata Wee Karoro, Mereda Wuni, Omba Rade, Tanggaba, Tarra Mata, Wee Kokora, Wee Patando, Wee Rame |
| Sumba Barat Daya | Wewewa Timur | | Dangga Mangu, Dede Pada, Dikira, Kadi Wano, Kadi Wone, Kalembu Ndara Mane, Lele Maya, Lete Kamouna (Lete Komouna), Mainda Ole, Maliti Dari, Mareda Kalada, Mata Pyawu, Mata Wee Lima, Mawo Dana, Nyura Lele, Pada Eweta, Tema Tana, Wee Lima, Wee Limbu |
| Sumba Barat Daya | Wewewa Utara | | Bodo Ponda, Djela Manu, Mali Mada, Mata Loko (Mataloko), Mawo Maliti, Odi Paurata, Pandua Tana, Puu Potto, Reda Wano, Wano Talla, Wee Namba, Wee Paboba |
| Sumba Tengah | Katiku Tana | | Anakalang, Dewa Jara, Kabela Wuntu, Makata Keri, Mata Redi, Mata Woga, Umbu Riri |
| Sumba Tengah | Katiku Tana Selatan (Katikutana Selatan) | | Dameka, Elu, Konda Maloba, Malinjak, Manurara, Oka Wacu, Tana Modu, Wailawa, Waimanu |
| Sumba Tengah | Mamboro | | Bondo Sulla, Cendana, Cendana Barat, Manu Wolu, Ole Ate, Ole Dewa, Susu Wendewa, Watu Asa, Wee Luri, Wendewa Barat, Wendewa Selatan, Wendewa Timur, Wendewa Utara |
| Sumba Tengah | Umbu Ratu Nggay | | Bolu Bokat Utara (Bulu Bokat Utara), Bolubokat Barat, Bulu Bokat (Bolu Bokat), Lenang, Lenang Selatan, Mara Desa, Maradesa Selatan, Maradesa Timur, Mbilur Pangadu, Ngadu Bolu, Ngadu Olu, Padira Tana, Praikoruku Jangga (Prai Karoku Jangga), Soru, Tana Mbanas, Tana Mbanas Barat, Tana Mbanas Selatan, Weluk Praimemang (Weluk Prai Memang) |
| Sumba Tengah | Umbu Ratu Nggay Barat | | Anajiaka, Anapalu, Daha Elu, Dewa Tana, Holur Kambata, Maderi, Mata Waikajawi, Pondok, Praimadeta, Sambali Loku, Umbu Jodu, Umbu Kawolu, Umbu Langang, Umbu Mamijuk, Umbu Pabal, Umbu Pabal Selatan, Wairasa, Wangga Waiyengu |
| Sumba Timur | Haharu | | Kadahang, Kalamba, Mbatapuhu (Mbata Puhu), Napu, Praibakul, Rambangaru, Wunga |
| Sumba Timur | Kahaunguweti (Kahaungu Eti) | | Kamanggih, Kambatabundung (Kambata Bundung), Kataka, Kota Kawau (Kotak Kawau), Laimbonga (Lai Mbonga), Matawai Katingga, Matawai Maringgu (Matawai Maringu), Mauramba (Mau Ramba), Meurumba (Meorumba) |
| Sumba Timur | Kambata Mapambuhang | | Laimeta (Lai Meta), Lukuwingir (Luku Wingir / Wikir), Mahubokul (Mahu Bokul), Maidang, Marada Mundi, Waibidi (Waimbidi) |
| Sumba Timur | Kambera | | Kambaniru, Kiri Tana (Kiritana), Lambanapu, Malumbi, Mau Hau (Mauhau), Mauliru, Prailiu, Wangga |
| Sumba Timur | Kanatang | | Hambapraing (Hamba Praing), Kuta, Mondu, Ndapayami, Temu |
| Sumba Timur | Karera | | Ananjaki, Janggamangu (Jangga Mangu), Nangga, Nggongi, Praimadita, Praisalura, Tandula Jangga |
| Sumba Timur | Katala Hamu Lingu | | Kompa Pari (Kombapari), Lailara (Lai Lara), Mandahu, Matawai Amahu, Praibakul (Prai Bakul) |
| Sumba Timur | Kota Waingapu | | Hambala, Kamalaputi, Kambajawa, Lukukamaru, Matawai, Mbatakapidu (Mbata Kapidu), Pambotandjara (Pambola Njara / Pambotanjara) |
| Sumba Timur | Lewa | | Bidi Hunga, Kambata Wundut, Kambuhapang (Kambu Hapang), Kondamara, Lewa Paku (Lewapaku), Matawai Pawali, Rakawatu, Tana Rara (Tanarara) |
| Sumba Timur | Lewa Tidahu | | BidiPraing, Kangeli, Laihau (Laihawu), Mondulambi (Mondu Lambi), Umamanu, Watumbelar |
| Sumba Timur | Mahu | | Haray (Harai), Lahiru (La Hiru), Lulundilu (Lujundilu), Patamawai, Praikalala, Wairara |
| Sumba Timur | Matawai Lappau (La Pawu) | | Karipi, Katiku Luku, Katiku Wai, Katikutana (Katiku Tana), Prai Bokul/Bakul, Wangga Meti |
| Sumba Timur | Ngadu Ngala | | Hambawutang (Hambautang / Hamba Wutang), Kabanda, Kakaha, Praiwitu (Prai Witu), Prauraming |
| Sumba Timur | Nggaha Ori Angu (Nggaha Oriangu) | | Kahiri, Makamenggit, Ngadulanggi (Ngadulangi), Praikarang (Prai Karang), Praipaha (Prai Paha), Pulu Panjang, Tanatuku, Tandula Jangga |
| Sumba Timur | Paberiwai | | Kananggar, Karera Jangga, Laitaku, Mahangwatu (Mehang Mata), Pabera Tanera/Manera, Praimbana (Prai Mbana), Winumuru |
| Sumba Timur | Pahunga Lodu | | Kaliuda, Kuruwaki, Lambakara, Mburukulu, Palanggai, Pamburu, Tamma, Tana Manang (Tanamanang) |
| Sumba Timur | Pandawai | | Kadumbul, Kambatatana (Kambata Tana), Kawangu, Laindeha, Maubokul, Palaka Hembi (Palakahembi), Watumbaka |
| Sumba Timur | Pinu Pahar (Pinupahar / Pirapahar) | | Lailunggi, Mahaniwa, Ramuk, Tawui, Wahang, Wangga Mbewa |
| Sumba Timur | Rindi | | Haikatapu (Heikatapu), Hanggaroru, Kabaru, Kayuri, Lailanjang (Lai Lanjang), Rindi, Tamburi, Tanaraing |
| Sumba Timur | Tabundung | | Bangga Watu, Billa, Karita, Kuki Talu, Pindu Horomi (Hurani), Praing Kareha, Tapil, Tarimbang, Waikanabu, Wudi Pandak |
| Sumba Timur | Umalulu | | Lairuru, Lumbukore, Matawai Atu, Mutunggeding, Ngaru Kanoru, Patawang, Umalulu, Wanga, Watuhadang (Watu Hadang), Watupuda (Watukuda / Watu Puda) |
| Sumba Timur | Wulla Waijelu (Wula Waijelu) | | Hadakamali, Lainjanji, Laipandak, Latena (La Tena), Lumbu Manggit, Paranda, Wulla (Wula) |
| Timor Tengah Selatan | Amanatun Selatan | | Anin, Fae, Fatulunu, Fenun, Kokoi, Kualeu, Lanu, Netutnana, Nifuleo, Nunleu, Oinlasi, Sunu, To'i (Toi) |
| Timor Tengah Selatan | Amanatun Utara | | Fatu Oni (Fatuoni), Fotilo (Fatilo), Lilo, Muna, Nasi, Snok, Sono, Tauanas, Tumu |
| Timor Tengah Selatan | Amanuban Barat | | Haumeni Baki (Haumenibaki), Mnelalete, Nifukani, Nule (Nulle), Nusa, Pusu, Tublopo (Meometan), Tubuhue |
| Timor Tengah Selatan | Amanuban Selatan | | Batnun, Bena, Eno Neten (Enoneten), Kiubaat, Linamnutu, Mio, Noemuke, Oebelo, Oekiu, Pollo |
| Timor Tengah Selatan | Amanuban Tengah | | Baki, Bone, Maunum Niki Niki, Nakfunu, Niki Niki, Nobi Nobi, Noebesa, Oe'ekam (Oeekam), Sopo, Taebesa, Tumu |
| Timor Tengah Selatan | Amanuban Timur | | Billa, Mauleum, Mnelaanen, Nifukiu, Oe'Ekam (Oe Ekam), Oelet, Pisan, Sini, Teluk (Telukh), Tliu |
| Timor Tengah Selatan | Batu Putih | | Benlutu, Boentuka, Hane, Oebobo, Oehela, Tuakole, Tupan (Tuppan) |
| Timor Tengah Selatan | Boking | | Baus, Boking, Fatu Manufui, Leonani (Leonmeni), Meusin, Nano, Sabun |
| Timor Tengah Selatan | Fatukopa | | Besnam, Ello, Fatukopa, Kiki, Nifulinah, Nunfutu, Taebone |
| Timor Tengah Selatan | Fatumnasi | | Fatumnasi, Kuanoel, Mutis, Nenas, Nuapin |
| Timor Tengah Selatan | Fautmolo | | Besle'u, Bileon, Kaeneno, Nunukhniti (Nunuhakniti), Oeleon, Sillu, Tunis |
| Timor Tengah Selatan | Kie (Ki'e) | | Belle, Boti, Eno Napi (Enonapi), Falas (Fallas), Fatukusi, Fatuulan, Naile'u, Napi, Nekmese, Oenai, Oinlasi, Pilli (Pili), Tesiayofanu (Tesi Ayofanu) |
| Timor Tengah Selatan | Kok Baun | | Benahe (Benehe), Koloto, Lotas, Niti, Obaki, Sabnala (Sapnala) |
| Timor Tengah Selatan | Kolbano | | Babuin, Haunobenak, Kolbano, Noesiu, Nununamat, Oeleu, Oetuke, Ofu, Pana, Pene Selatan, Se'i (Sei), Spaha |
| Timor Tengah Selatan | Kot Olin | | Binenok, Fatuat, Hoibeti, Kot'olin (Kot Olin), Nualunat, Nunbena, O'obibi (O Obibi), Ponite (Panite) |
| Timor Tengah Selatan | Kota Soe | | Cendana, Kampung Baru, Karang Sirih (Karang Siri), Kobekamusa, Kota Baru, Kuatae, Noemeto, Nonohonis, Nunumeu, Oe Kefan (Oekefan), Oebesa, So E (Soe), Taubneno |
| Timor Tengah Selatan | Kualin | | Kiufatu, Kualin, Nunusunu, Oemaman, Oni, Toineke, Tuafanu, Tuapakas |
| Timor Tengah Selatan | Kuanfatu | | Basmuti, Kakan, Kelle, Kelle Tunan, Kuanfatu, Kusi, Kusi Utara, Lasi, Noebeba, Oebo, Oehan, Olais, Taupi |
| Timor Tengah Selatan | Kuatnana | | Enoneontes, Lakat, Naukae, O'of (Oof), Oe Oe, Supul, Tetaf, Tubmonas |
| Timor Tengah Selatan | Mollo Barat | | Besana, Fatukoko, Koa, Oel Uban (Oeuban), Salbait |
| Timor Tengah Selatan | Mollo Selatan | | Bikekneno, Biloto, Bisene, Kesetnana, Noinbila, Oinlasi, Tuasene |
| Timor Tengah Selatan | Mollo Tengah | | Binaus, Kualeu, Nekemunifeto (Neke Manifeto), Oel'ekam, Oelbubuk, Pika |
| Timor Tengah Selatan | Mollo Utara | | Ajaobaki, Bijaepunu, Bosen, Eonbesi (Eon Besi), Fatukoto, Halmei (Halme), Iusmolo, Kokfe'u, Lelobatan, Leloboko, Nefokoko, Netpala, O'besi (Obesi), Sebot, Taiftob, To'fen, To'manat, Tunua |
| Timor Tengah Selatan | Noebana | | Fatumnasi, Mella, Mnelapetu, Noebana, Suni |
| Timor Tengah Selatan | Noebeba | | Eno Nabuasa, Fatutnana, Naip, Oe'ekam (Oe Ekam / Oelekam), Oebaki, Oepliki, Teas |
| Timor Tengah Selatan | Nunbena | | Feto Mone, Lill ana (Liliana), Noebesi, Nunbena, Taneotob, Tunbes |
| Timor Tengah Selatan | Nunkolo | | Fat, Haineno (Hoineno), Haumeni, Nenoat, Nunkolo, Op, Putun, Saenam, Sahan |
| Timor Tengah Selatan | Oenino | | Abi, Hoi, Neke, Niki Niki Un, Noenoni (Noe Noni), Oenino, Pene Utara |
| Timor Tengah Selatan | Polen | | Balu, Bijeli, Fatumnutu, Konbaki, Laob, Loli, Mnesatbubuk (Mnesatbubak), Oelnunuh, Puna, Sainoni, Usapimnasi |
| Timor Tengah Selatan | Santian | | Manufui, Naifatu, Nenotes, Poli, Santian |
| Timor Tengah Selatan | Tobu | | Bestobe, Bonleu, Huetalan, Pubasu, Saubalan, Tobu, Tune, Tutem |
| Timor Tengah Selatan | Toianas | | Bokong, Lobus, Milli, Noeolin, Oeleu, Sanbet (Sambet), Skinu, Toianas, Tuataum |
| Timor Tengah Utara | Biboki Anleu | | Kotafoun, Maukabatan, Motadik, Nifutasi, Nonotbatan (Nonatbatan), Oemanu, Ponu, Sifaniha, Tuamese |
| Timor Tengah Utara | Biboki Feotleu | | Birunatun, Kuluan, Makun, Manumean, Naku |
| Timor Tengah Utara | Biboki Moenleu | | Kaubele, Luniup, Matabesi, Oepuah, Oepuah Selatan, Oepuah Utara, Tunbes |
| Timor Tengah Utara | Biboki Selatan | | Oenaem, Pantae, Sainiup, Supun, Tautpah, Tokbesi, Tunbaen, Up Faon (Upfaon) |
| Timor Tengah Utara | Biboki Tan Pah | | Oekopa, Oerinbesi, T'Eba Timur (Teba Timur), Teba |
| Timor Tengah Utara | Biboki Utara | | Biloe, Boronubaen, Boronubaen Timur, Hautaes, Hauteas Barat, Lokomea, Sapaen, Taunbaen, Taunbaen Timur, Tualena |
| Timor Tengah Utara | Bikomi Nilulat | | Haumeni Ana, Inbate, Nainaban, Nilulat, Sunkaen, Tubu |
| Timor Tengah Utara | Bikomi Selatan | | Kiusili, Maurisu, Maurisu Selatan, Maurisu Tengah, Maurisu Utara, Naiola, Naiola Timur, Oelami, Oetalus, Tublopo |
| Timor Tengah Utara | Bikomi Tengah | | Buk, Kuenak, Nimasi, Oelbonak, Oenenu, Oenenu Selatan, Oenenu Utara, Oenino, Sono |
| Timor Tengah Utara | Bikomi Utara | | Baas, Banain A, Banain B, Banain C, Faenake (Faennake), Haumeni, Napan, Sainoni, Tes |
| Timor Tengah Utara | Insana | | Ainiut, Bitauni, Botof, Fatoin, Fatu'ana, Keun, Loeram, Manunain A, Manunain B, Nansean, Nansean Timur, Nunmafo, Oenbit, Sekon, Susulaku, Susulaku B, Tapenpah |
| Timor Tengah Utara | Insana Barat | | Atmen, Atmen (Kelurahan Atmen), Bannae, Lapeom, Letneo, Letneo Selatan, Nifunenas, Oabikase, Subun, Subun Bestobe, Subun Tualele, Usapinonot |
| Timor Tengah Utara | Insana Fafinesu | | Banuan/Baunuan, Fafinesu, Fafinesu A, Fafinesu B, Fafinesu C, Oenain |
| Timor Tengah Utara | Insana Tengah | | Lanaus, Letmafo, Letmafo Timur, Maubesi, Oehalo, Sone, Tainsala |
| Timor Tengah Utara | Insana Utara | | Fatumtasa, Humusu C, Humusu Oekolo (Humusu A), Humusu Sainiup (Humusu B), Oesoko |
| Timor Tengah Utara | Kota Kefamenanu | | Aplasi, Bansone, Benpasi, Kefamenanu Selatan, Kefamenanu Tengah, Kefamenanu Utara, Maubeli, Sasi, Tubuhue |
| Timor Tengah Utara | Miomaffo Tengah (Miomafo Tengah) | | Akomi, Bijaepasu, Neonasi, Nian, Tuabatan, Tuabatan Barat |
| Timor Tengah Utara | Miomafo Barat | | Eban, Fatuneno, Fatunisuan, Fatutasu, Haulasi, Lemon, Manusasi, Neotoko, Noepesu, Sa'tab, Saenam, Sallu, Suanae |
| Timor Tengah Utara | Miomafo Timur | | Amol, Bitefa, Bokon, Fatusene, Femnasi, Jak, Keanbaun (Kaenbaun), Oesena, Taekas, Tunoe, Tuntun |
| Timor Tengah Utara | Musi | | Ainan, Batnes, Bisafe, Oelneke, Oeolo, Oetulu |
| Timor Tengah Utara | Mutis | | Naekake A, Naekake B, Noelelo, Tasinifu |
| Timor Tengah Utara | Naibenu | | Bakitolas, Benus, Manamas, Sunsea |
| Timor Tengah Utara | Noemuti | | Banfanu, Bijeli, Fatumuti, Kiuola, Nibaaf, Nifuboke, Noebaun, Noemuti, Oenak, Oeperigi, Popnam, Seo |
| Timor Tengah Utara | Noemuti Timur | | Haekto, Kuaken, Manikin, Naob |
