= Don Paulus Centis Ximenes da Silva =

Indonesian raja (1902–1972)

Acting Regent of Sikka
- In office 1958 – 1 March 1960
- Preceded by: Position created Himself (as Raja)
- Succeeded by: Paulus Samador da Cunha

Raja of Sikka
- In office 18 May 1954 – 1958
- Preceded by: Don Thomas Ximenes da Silva
- Succeeded by: Position abolished Himself (as acting regent)

Personal details
- Born: 26 June 1902 Sikka, Dutch East Indies
- Died: 16 August 1972 (aged 70) Sikka, East Nusa Tenggara, Indonesia

Don Paulus Centis Ximenes da Silva (26 June 1902 – 16 August 1972) was the last raja of Sikka in East Nusa Tenggara, and its first regent between 1958 and 1960 following Sikka's reorganization into Sikka Regency.

== Early life ==
Da Silva was born on 26 June 1902, in the middle of a cholera outbreak at the Kingdom of Sikka. His father was Mbako Ximenez da Silva, the thirteenth ruler of Sikka from the da Silva family. After completing elementary school at the village of Sikka (south of Maumere), he studied at a colonial school until 1918. That year, he moved to Manado to continue his education at a high school. He became a schoolteacher in Sikka upon his return from Manado in 1922.

After five years as a schoolteacher, da Silva travelled to Batavia to study malarial medicine, and he worked as a health practitioner in Sikka for seven years. He was appointed as district chief of Lekeba'i (part of Sikka) in either 1935 or 1936 under Sikka's then-raja Don Thomas Ximenes da Silva (his older brother).

== Raja and regent ==
By 1948, Don Thomas had been appointed as regional head of the entire island of Flores, and this required him to relocate to Ende. Hence, da Silva was appointed to run the local government in Sikka in his stead. Don Thomas would die in Ende on 18 May 1954. Thomas' succession was questionable, as he had a son: Don Josephus Daniel da Silva, but Ximenes da Silva would end up succeeding his brother as raja. Anthropologist Daniel Lewis theorized that this was due to Ximenes being older, and thus Indonesian authorities expected him to be less likely to complicate the transition from monarchy to a normal regency for very long. Daniel da Silva would dispute this succession until his death in 1993.

During his time as Sikka's raja, da Silva made efforts to stop the annual flooding of Maumere. By 1958, the Indonesian government reorganized the area from a network of autonomous regions into regular administrative divisions, with Sikka being reorganized as a regency under the provincial government in Kupang. Da Silva was appointed the acting head (regent/bupati) of Sikka, until he was replaced by Paulus Samador da Cunha on 1 March 1960.

== Later life ==
He died on 16 August 1972 while organizing celebrations of Indonesia's 27th independence anniversary, and he was buried in Maumere.
