= Babi Island (Flores) =

Island in Indonesia

Babi

Geography
- Location: South East Asia
- Coordinates: 8.4241°S 122.5103°E
- Highest elevation: 351 m (1152 ft)

Administration
- Indonesia

Babi Island (Indonesian: Pulau Babi, literally Pig Island) is an island located off the coast of Flores, East Nusa Tenggara.

== Layout ==
Babi is a roughly circular island less than 2.4 kilometres (1.5 mi) in diameter located 5 kilometres (3.1 mi) to the north of Flores. Its maximum height above sea level is 351 metres (1,152 ft). Its north end is bordered by a wide coral reef and faces the Flores Sea. Further south there is a small tidal flat where two villages were built, the majority-Christian Pagaraman to the east and majority-Muslim Kampungbaru to the west. At the southern end of the island, the barrier reef tapers. It is administratively part of Sikka Regency, East Nusa Tenggara.

== History ==
On 12 December 1992, an earthquake occurred near Flores at 05:29 UTC. Within three minutes, at least one tsunami approached Babi Island from the direction of the earthquake's epicenter to the north, while a second may have hit the southwest side of the island after refracting around the southern side. The tsunami waves reached a height of 7.2 metres (24 ft); this was "unexpectedly large". Between 263 and 700 of the island's 1,093 inhabitants were killed and both villages were completely destroyed.

== Diving ==
Babi is home to many diving sites. One, called The Crack, was formed during the 1992 earthquake. Located in a reef 20 metres (66 ft) below the water, the 70-centimetre (28 in) crack reaches a length of 30 metres (98 ft). Numerous forms of aquatic life, including eagle rays, hammerhead sharks, and spider crabs can be found there. This spot also becomes one of the favorite place for travelers spend their time on snorkeling and diving.

== Bibliography ==
- Bryant, Edward (2001). Tsunami: The Underrated Hazard. New York: Cambridge University Press. ISBN 978-0-521-77244-0.
- Choi, Byung Ho; Kim, Dong Chule; Pelinovsky, Efim; Woo, Seung Buhm (2007). "Three-dimensional simulation of a tsunami run-up around conical island" (PDF). Coastal Engineering. 52 (8). Elsevier: 618–629. doi:10.1016/j.coastaleng.2007.02.001. Archived from the original (PDF) on 20 March 2012.
- Dudley, Walter C.; Lee, Min (1998). Tsunami!. Honolulu: University of Hawaii Press. ISBN 978-0-585-26569-8.
- "Significant Earthquakes of the World". United States Geological Service.
- "Daftar Pulau-pulau di NTT" [List of Islands in East Nusa Tenggara]. Government of East Nusa Tenggara. Archived from the original on 21 July 2011.
- Zubi, Teresa. "Dive sites in Flores, Indonesia". Starfish.ch.
- "Flores Indonesia Tsunami Pictures". USC Civil Engineering Department.
