= Pemana Islands =

Nine islands in East Nusa Tenggara, Indonesia

Coordinates: 8°21′35″S 122°18′10″E

The Pemana Islands are a small chain of islands in the Flores Sea. The islands are administered as part of the Sikka Regency in East Nusa Tenggara Province, Indonesia.

== Description ==
The Pemana Islands are a small group of nine islands located in the Flores Sea. The islands lie to the north of Maumere and are accessible by boat. The largest of the islands is Pemana Besar, and the inhabitants of the islands are considered part of the Buginese people.
