= Sikka Regency =

Regency in East Nusa Tenggara, Indonesia

Sikka Regency Kabupaten Sikka
- Regency
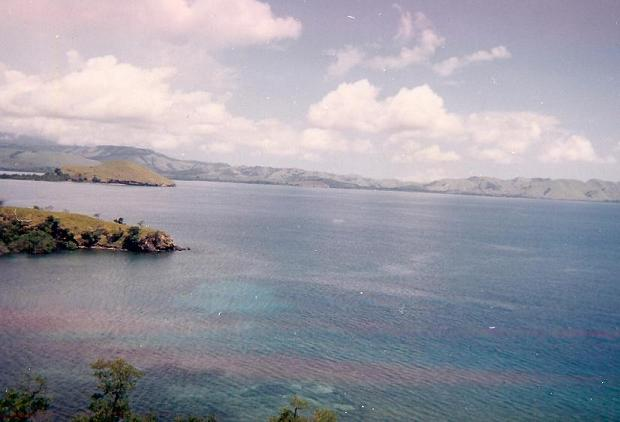
- Beach of Maumere

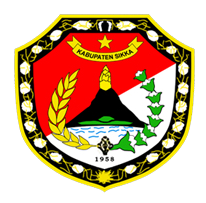
- Coat of arms

- Location within East Nusa Tenggara

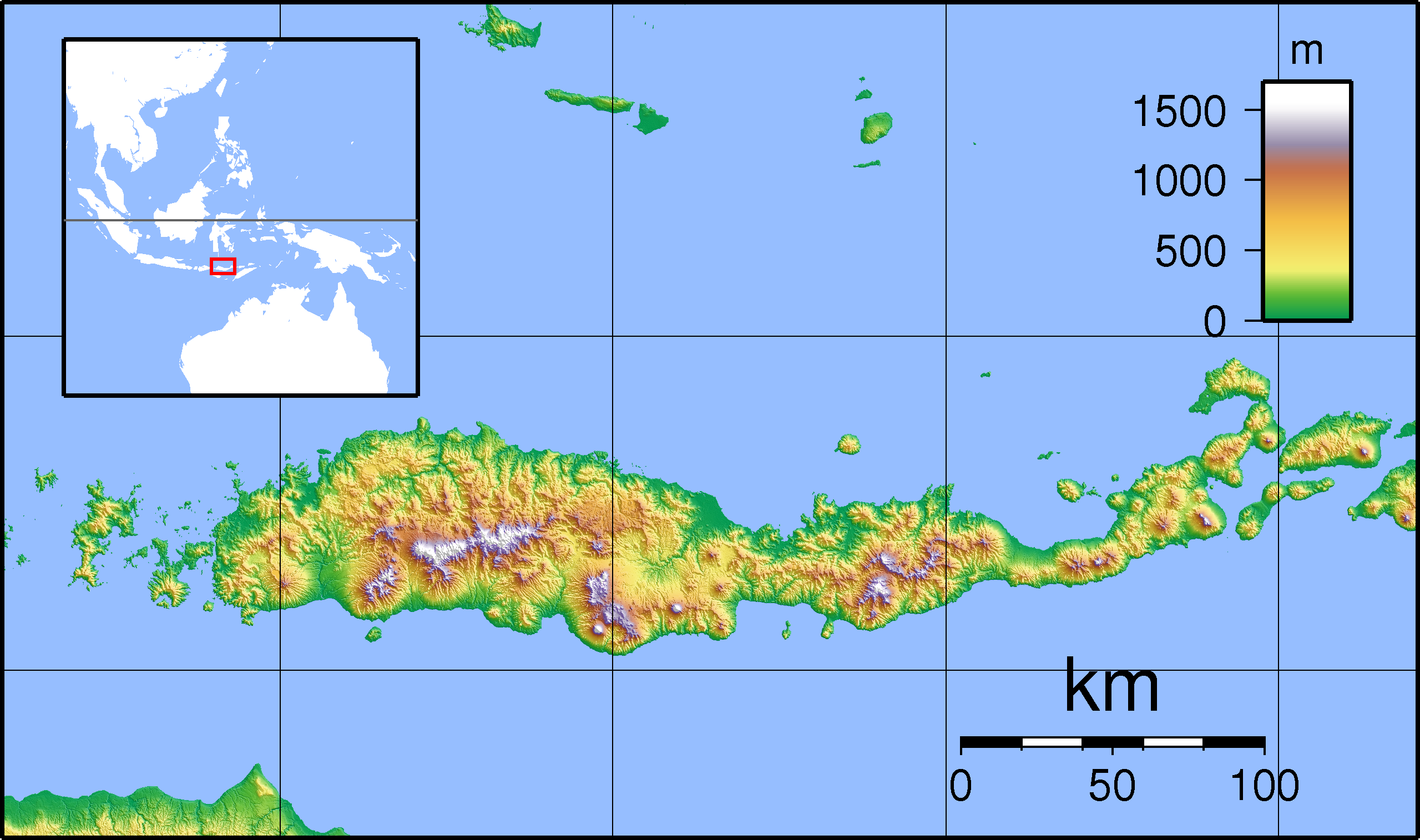
- Location in Flores, Lesser Sunda Islands and Indonesia Sikka Regency (Lesser Sunda Islands) Sikka Regency (Indonesia)
- Coordinates: 08°36′59″S 122°12′29″E
- Country: Indonesia
- Region: Lesser Sunda Islands
- Province: East Nusa Tenggara
- Capital: Maumere

Government
  - Regent: Juventus Prima Yoris Kago
  - Vice Regent: Simon Subandi Supriadi

Area
  - Total: 1,675.36 km^{2} (646.86 sq mi)

Population (mid 2025 estimate)
  - Total: 345,319
  - Density: 206.116/km^{2} (533.839/sq mi)
- Area code: (+62) 382
- Website: sikkakab.go.id

Sikka is a regency within East Nusa Tenggara province, Indonesia, on the island of Flores. It is bordered to the west by Ende Regency and to the east by East Flores Regency. It covers an area of 1,675.36 km^{2} and has a population around 345 thousand people. The capital is the town of Maumere, which includes the districts of Alok Barat, Alok and Alok Timur having a combined population of 93,425 in mid 2025 (although the last two also include a number of inhabited islands to the north of Flores such as the Pemana Islands, Pulau Samparong, Pulau Besar and Pulau Babi, leaving 82,064 as the urban area on Flores Island).

== History ==
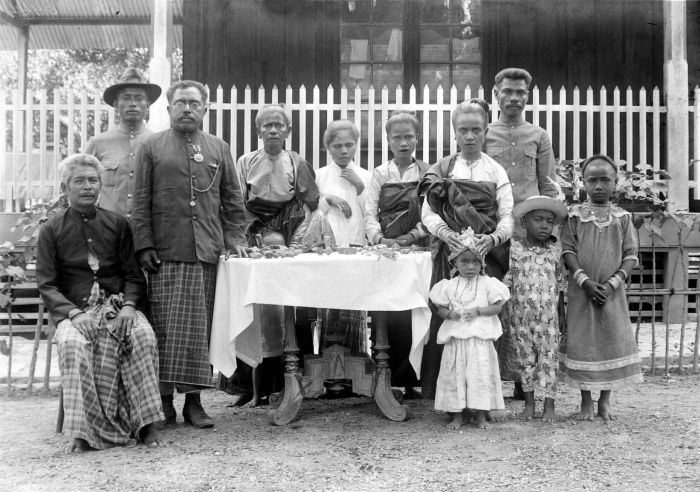
Raja of Sikka with his family, c. 1915.

Prior to Indonesian independence, much of the present-day regency was part of the Kingdom of Sikka. The founding of the kingdom, associated with its first raja's adoption of Catholicism, is generally celebrated as 1607. The kingdom was initially centered in Sikka Natar on the south coast, today the village of Sikka in Lela district of the regency. The kingdom from its outset was strongly influenced by the Portuguese, in particular "Black Portuguese" residing in Timor. Portuguese colonial authorities transferred Sikka, along with its remaining holdings in Flores, to the Dutch East Indies in 1859.

The Dutch would establish a new seat of government in Maumere, and by the late 1910s the raja of Sikka had also moved there. Dutch rule also saw the formation of two smaller kingdoms, Kangae and Nita, coupled with the secession of the Lio-speaking areas to the southwest of Sikka into their own polity sometime prior to 1859. These polities would be re-annexed into the Kingdom of Sikka by the late 1920s. Sikka remained as an autonomous region within independent Indonesia until the death of its raja in 1952, which then ended the legal status of the kingdom.

Following administrative reorganization of the Lesser Sunda Islands in 1958, Sikka was formed as a regency in East Nusa Tenggara. However, the raja retained political influence and cultural authority, leading to pushback against republicanism in Sikka throughout the 1950s and 1960s. There was also conflict between the Catholic Party and the Communist Party, and following the 30 September movement in Jakarta local communist leaders and perceived sympathizers were prosecuted and massacred. Between 800 and 1,500 people were killed in the killings, including local political leader Jan Djong.

Pope John Paul II visited Sikka in October 1989, and the room he stayed in overnight still received pilgrims decades after. Sikka was heavily impacted by the 1992 Flores earthquake and tsunami, especially its northern coastal regions and outlying islands. Out of around 2,500 dead in the disaster, 1,490 were from Maumere and another 700 were from Sikka Regency's Babi Island.

The diocese of Maumere, which is coterminous with Sikka Regency, was established on 14 December 2005.

== Administrative divisions ==
The regency is divided into twenty-one districts (kecamatan), tabulated below with their areas and their populations at the 2010 census and the 2020 census, together with the official estimates as of mid-2025. The table also includes the locations of the district administrative centres, the number of administrative villages in each district (totaling 147 rural desa and 13 urban kelurahan - the latter all in the three "Alok" districts which include Maumere town), and its post code.

Kode Wilayah	Name of District (kecamatan)	Area in km^{2}	Pop'n census 2010	Pop'n census 2020	Pop'n estimate mid 2025	Admin centre	No. of villages	Post codes
53.07.01	Paga	71.52	15,598	16,399	17,379	Paga	8	86153
53.07.02	Mego	101.90	11,873	12,939	13,953	Lekebai	10	86113
53.07.17	Tana Wawo	89.55	8,695	8,926	9,351	Wolofeo	6	86154
53.07.03	Lela	45.96	11,645	11,596	11,995	Lela	9	86161
53.07.11	Bola	444.97	10,785	10,797	11,174	Bola	6	86171
53.07.20	Doreng	54.03	11,191	12,002	12,842	Waihawa	7	86170
53.07.21	Mapitara	82.89	6,304	6,672	7,094	Hebing	4	86172
53.07.08	Talibura	287.30	20,454	22,424	24,251	Talibura	12	86183
53.07.09	Waigete	233.01	22,181	24,931	27,289	Waigete	6	86184
53.07.13	Waiblama	120.05	7,042	8,074	8,923	Tanarawa	9	86185
53.07.10	Kewapante	22.09	13,453	14,775	15,992	Kewapante	8	86182
53.07.18	Hewokloang	17.90	8,243	8,998	9,711	Baowunut	7	86181
53.07.19	Kangae	39.69	16,389	18,055	19,572	Waippare	9	86180
53.07.06	Palu'e ^{(a)}	39.69	9,553	9,681	9,824	Uwa	8	86110
53.07.16	Koting	14.16	6,360	6,526	6,835	Koting D	6	86116
53.07.07	Nelle	13.31	5,792	6,147	6,544	Nelle Urung	5	86119
53.07.04	Nita	111.72	21,223	22,748	24,334	Nita	12	86151
53.07.12	Magepanda	136.21	11,508	12,727	13,822	Magepanda	5	86152
53.07.05	Alok ^{(b)} (Central Alok)	15.71 (21.04)	33,064	32,629	33,366	Kota Uneng	7 ^{(c)}	86112: 86118
53.07.14	Alok Barat (West Alok)	42.04 (48.17)	16,808	22,294	25,070	Wailiti	4 ^{(d)}	86114: 86115
53.07.15	Alok Timur ^{(e)} (East Alok)	19.09 (80.20)	32,167	32,797	34,989	Waioti	10 ^{(f)}	86111: 86115
	Totals	1,675.36	300,328	321,953	345,319	Maumere	160	

Notes: (a) Palu'e is an island district, situated off the north coast of Flores (actually located north of Ende Regency rather than Sikka Regency).
(b) includes the offshore islands of Pulau Pemana Besar and Pulau Pemana Kecil (with a combined population of 5,050 in mid 2025) and, further north, Pulau Sukun or Samparong (with a population of 1,078 in mid 2025).
(c) comprises 4 kelurahan (Kabor, Kota Uneng, Madawat and Nangalimang) and 3 desa.
(d) comprising four kelurahan (Hewuli, Wailiti, Wolomarang and Wuring).
(e) includes the offshore islands of Pulau Koja or Pulau Besar (with 3,176 inhabitants in mid 2025), Pulau Parumaan (with 2,062 inhabitants in mid 2025 - including Pulau Pangabatan, Pulau Mermaan and Pulau Dambila) - and (further northeast) Pulau Babi.
(f) comprising five kelurahan (Beru, Kota Baru, Nangameting, Waioti and Wairotang) and five desa (including three on the offshore islands).

A small Sikka region (non administrative) called Iwangeté or Iwang Geté encompasses the villages of Watublapi (Hewokloang district), Héwokloang, Kloangpopot (Doreng district), Hale (Mapitara district), and Hebingare (and quite a few others in between). Krowe is another name for this area, although neither names are quite accurate. People of this area produce a very distinctive ikat cloth: the widest bands (called ina geté) bear such motifs as lizard (teké), a circular motif seen on some antique plates (pigan uben), spinning wheel (jata selér) and pineapple flower (petan puhun).

== Demographics ==
Historical population
Year	Pop.	±%
1971	190,143	—
1980	219,656	+15.5%
1990	246,867	+12.4%
2000	263,284	+6.7%
2010	300,328	+14.1%
2020	321,953	+7.2%
2025	345,319	+7.3%
Source: Badan Pusat Statistik, 2026 and earlier editions.

According to the 2020 Indonesian census, Sikka had a population of 321,953 people, an increase from 300,328 in the 2010 census. The mid 2025 official estimate for the population is 345,319 (168,336 males and 176,983 females). Out of this, 97,863 were below 15 years old, while 27,9692 were 65 years or older.

In terms of religious affiliation, Sikka is comparable with the rest of Flores with Catholicism being the dominant religion, adhered to by 84.25 percent of the population as of 2024 according to Statistics Indonesia. This is followed by Islam at 14.16 percent and Protestant Christianity at 1.43 percent, respectively. The Catholic News Agency reported that Sikka (as the Diocese of Maumere) had just over 300 thousand Catholics. This made Sikka the regency with the second-largest number of Catholics across Indonesia, behind Manggarai. The Muslim population are largely affiliated with Muhammadiyah, which had established a number of schools across Sikka.

The indigenous people of Sikka in mainland Flores identify with three ethnic groups: the Lio-speaking Ata Lio inhabiting western Sikka along with the Sikka-speaking Ata Krowe in the central parts and Ata Tana Ai in the eastern parts. The Bajau people also inhabit parts of northern Sikka along with some of the smaller islands in the regency, while the Palu'e people inhabit Palue Island. Significant migrant populations include Buginese, Makassarese, Mandarese, Chinese, and Javanese.

== Politics ==
As with other Indonesian regencies, the municipal government consists of a directly elected bupati (regent) serving five-year terms and a Regional House of Representatives (DPRD). The first direct bupati election in Sikka was held in 2008, with the DPRD electing the bupati prior to that. As of the 2024–2029 term, the DPRD has 35 members elected from three districts, with the Indonesian Democratic Party of Struggle holding the most seats (5). The regent for the 2025–2030 term is Juventus Prima Yoris Kago, who was elected in the 2024 Sikka regency election.

At the provincial level, Sikka is represented in the East Nusa Tenggara Regional House of Representatives as part of its 6th electoral district, which it shares with three other regencies in Flores. Nationally, Sikka is part of the East Nusa Tenggara I district.

=== List of regents ===
- D.P.C. Ximenes da Silva (1958–1960)
- Paulus Samador da Cunha (1960–1967)
- Laurentius Say (1967–1977)
- Daniel Woda Palle (1977–1988)
- Avelinus Maschur Conterius (1988–1993)
- Alexander Idong (1993–1998)
- Paulus Moa (1998–2003)
- Alexander Longginus (2003–2008)
- Sosimus Mitang (2008–2013)
- Yoseph Ansar Rera (2013–2018)
- Fransiskus Roberto Diogo (2018–2023)
- Juventus Prima Yoris Kago (2025–present)

== See also ==
- Sikka people
- Sikka language
- Palu island
- Rokatenda
- Maumere
- 1992 Flores earthquake and tsunami
- Babi Island
