= Kingdom of Sikka =

Historical kingdom in Indonesia

- 1607–1958
- Modern Sikka Regency, which largely corresponds to the Sikka polity
- Capital: Sikka Natar; Maumere
- Common languages: Sikka
- Religion: Roman Catholicism
- Demonym: Sikkanese (Ata Sikka)
- Government: Monarchy
- History
  - Established: 1607
  - Disestablished: 1958

Area
- 1,675 km^{2} (647 sq mi)
Succeeded by
Sikka Regency
- Today part of: Indonesia

The Kingdom of Sikka (Indonesian: Kerajaan Sikka) was a polity in Flores, modern-day Indonesia, which largely corresponded to modern-day Sikka Regency. For most of its history, its seat of government was at Sikka Natar on the south coast of Flores, until the founding of Maumere in the 20th century which resulted in the transfer of the center of government there.

According to local tradition, its first raja ruled from 1607 after introducing Roman Catholicism, although prior rulers had established themselves at Sikka Natar and spread their rule around modern Sikka. The Portuguese which previously held influence over Sikka ceded it to the Dutch in 1859, and the Dutch colonial government established a new center of power at Maumere by the 1910s. It remained as an autonomous region under independent Indonesia until it was subsumed into a regular administrative unit in 1958.

== Government and politics ==
The kingdom was centered at Sikka Natar, today Sikka village on the south coast of Flores facing the Savu Sea. The modern regency of Sikka, which was created from the kingdom's territories under colonial rule, has an area of around 1,675 square kilometres (647 sq mi). His territory even reached Palue Island (Nua Lu'a) in the Flores Sea, which is closer to Ende.

Later on, the Catholic Church would play a significant role in Sikka's government, with missionaries providing legitimacy to the Sikka raja's rule, while the raja granted extensive access to his subjects. In some cases, this included compulsory attendance of schools and churches. A missionary school had been established in Sikka by 1909, and starting from 1913 it received significant support and subsidies from the colonial government of the Dutch East Indies.

== History ==
Much of the surviving history of Sikka is derived from handwritten manuscripts of two local scholars in Sikka, Dominicus Dionitius Pareira Kondi (1886–1962) and Alexius Boer Pareira (1888–1980). These manuscripts are compiled and published in Indonesian as the Hikayat Kerajaan Sikka ("Chronicles of the Kingdom of Sikka").

=== Founding and Portuguese period ===
According to Sikkan oral myths, as recorded by Kondi and Boer, the founding of the Sikkan polity originates from immigrants from the Bengal region (or from Siam) shipwrecked west of Sikka Natar and intermarrying with local women. The leader of the immigrants, Raé Raja, was recorded as the first ruler of Sikka. According to Kondi, Sikkan ruler Mo'ang Bata Jawa ruled in the 16th century, and established legal and ritual customs along with founding new villages and starting trade with outsiders. One of his successors, Mo'ang Baga Ngang, established Sikkan authority across much of east-central Flores and established the seat of power in Sikka Natar.

Baga Ngang's son Don Alésu was recorded by Kondi and Boer as the first Sikkan raja. Sikka's oral history recorded him as having travelled to Malacca where he studied for three years before returning to Sikka and introducing Roman Catholicism. His return to Sikka was recorded to be in 1607. Alésu established a governmental system for Sikka, with eight kapitan subordinate to the raja and ten aristocrats forming an advisory council.

Later rulers of Sikka would form alliances with the Portuguese based in Timor, sending troops to aid the Portuguese in local conflicts. These alliances were reinforced by matrimonial ties with the Topass ("Black Portuguese") communities in Timor.

=== Dutch and Indonesian period ===
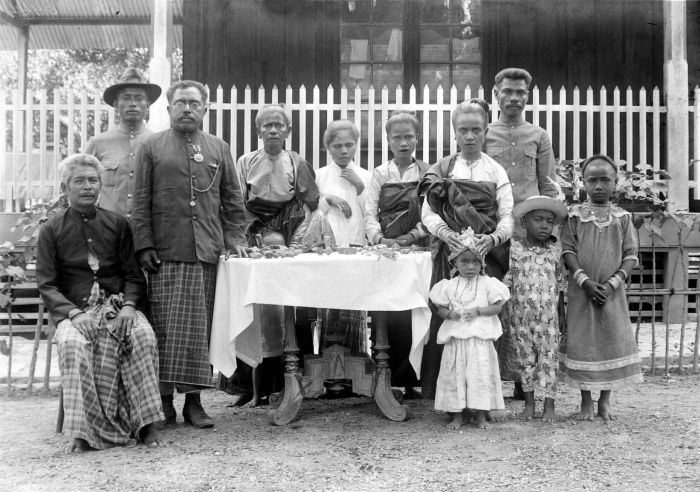
Raja of Sikka with his family, c. 1915.

The Portuguese ceded their rights over eastern Flores, including Sikka, to the Dutch in the 1859 treaty of Lisbon. Shortly after the treaty, Sikka came under the influence of Larantuka to the east. A dispute with a powerful Bugis merchant had led Sikka's raja to seek aid from Larantuka, providing him with taxes from settlements in Sikka's northern coast (and islands such as Besar) for three years in exchange for military protection. After the agreed period had passed, the Sikkan raja refused to continue the arrangement, leading to conflict between Sikka and Larantuka. The southwestern sections of Sikka, inhabited by the Lio people, also seceded to form its own polity, which was recognized by the Dutch and Portuguese in their 1859 treaty.

The Dutch established their government post for Sikka in Maumere, in the north coast, in 1879. Colonial authorities would recognize smaller polities in areas previously subservient to Sikka, namely Nita (1890) and Kangae (January 1903). Kangae in particular was separated due to its ruler's conversion to Islam, coupled by instability within Sikka caused by the successive deaths of two Sikkan raja in 1902 due to cholera. Following a period of unrest in 1911–1914, Kangae and Nita were annexed into Sikka in 1923 (formally in 1929). The Lio polity was similarly annexed around the same time. Maumere, on the north coast, was established as the new colonial seat in the area, with a new European settlement. Sikka was governed as an autonomous zelfbestuur in the Onderafdeling of Maumere. The seat of the raja moved to Maumere in 1917 or 1918.

Following Indonesian independence, Sikka was initially part of the State of East Indonesia before it was organized as a second-level autonomous region under the Lesser Sunda province. Another administrative reorganization in 1958 established Sikka as a regency, with the last Sikka king Don Paulus Centis Ximenes da Silva becoming its first regent.

== Economy ==
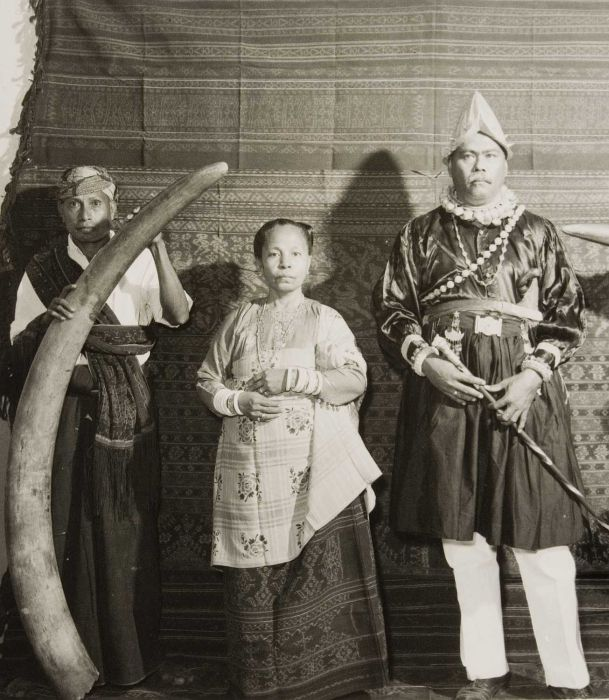
Raja of Sikka c. 1940s. In the left is an ivory ornament.

Throughout most of its history, Sikka's economy was based around subsistence agriculture. Sikka's agricultural economy recognized individual land ownership, in contrast to communal land systems used in most of eastern Indonesia at the time. During the early 20th century, Sikka's kings promoted coconut cultivation to produce copra as a tradeable commodity, taxed at 8 percent by the Sikka polity. Cotton was also promoted by colonial administrators, but its cultivation went into decline by the 1920s. Throughout Dutch rule, Sikka's economy went through a transformation as more direct colonial government rule took hold, taxes were imposed, and new roads and settlements were built.

Sikkan merchants were active in the sandalwood trade, acquiring supplies from Sumba. As Sikka's kings utilized ivory and its crafts as symbols of their power, and they were also used as bride price, Sikka imported tusks. In exchange, Sikka exported sandalwood, dye woods, and cinnamon, in addition to slaves and indentured workers. The Kanga'e area in the northeast was inhabited by Muslim Bajau fishermen.

== Legacy ==
Although the Sikkan kingship had been abolished, the former raja da Silva family remained culturally influential. A number of objects from the royal collection are traditionally shown to the public annually on Good Friday. A number of buildings, such as a church and the former raja's house at the old Sikkan capital at the modern regency's southern coast remain, but are largely unmaintained.

== Bibliography ==
- Lewis, E. Douglas (2010). The Stranger-Kings of Sikka: With an Integrated Edition of Two Manuscripts on the Origin and History of the Rajadom of Sikka. BRILL. ISBN 978-90-04-25377-3.
- Hägerdal, Hans (2025). "Dutch Colonialism and Portuguese Land Legacies in Flores". Colonial Land Legacies in the Portuguese-Speaking World. University of Calgary Press.
- Steenbrink, Karel (2013). "Dutch Colonial Containment of Islam in Manggarai, West-Flores, in Favour of Catholicism, 1907-1942". Bijdragen tot de Taal-, Land- en Volkenkunde. 169 (1): 104–128. ISSN 0006-2294. JSTOR 43817862.
- Van Klinken, Gerry (2023). Kewargaan Pascakolonial di Indonesia: Sebuah Sejarah Populer (in Indonesian). Yayasan Pustaka Obor Indonesia. ISBN 978-623-321-226-7.
