= Flores Sea =

Indonesian sea between Celebes and the Sunda Islands of Flores and Sumbawa

- Laut Flores (Indonesian)
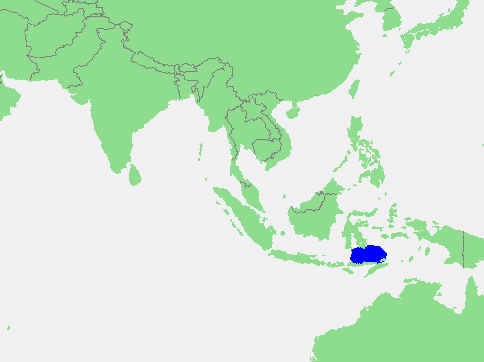
- Location of the Flores Sea within Southeast Asia

- Location within Indonesia
- Coordinates: 7.04°S 120.14°E
- Type: Sea
- Basin countries: Indonesia
- Surface area: 121,000 km^{2} (47,000 sq mi)

The Flores Sea is a body of water bounded on the north by the Indonesian island of Sulawesi and on the south by the Sunda Islands of Flores and Sumbawa. It covers an area of 121,000 square kilometres (47,000 sq mi).

== Geography ==
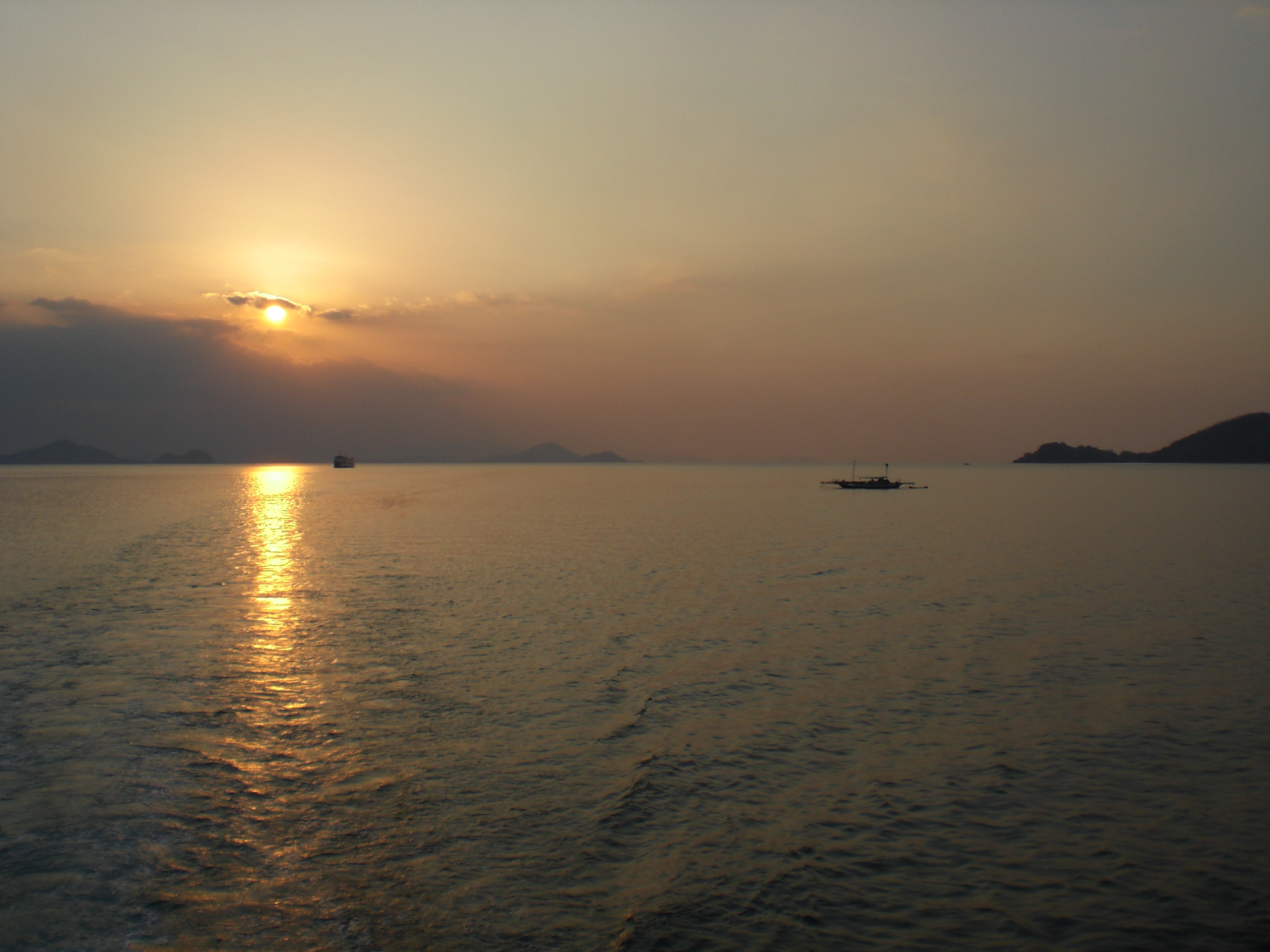
Flores Sea

The seas that border the Flores Sea are the Bali Sea (to the west), the Java Sea (to the northwest), and the Banda Sea (to the east and northeast).

The Indian Ocean and the Savu Sea lie to the south but are separated from the Flores Sea by various islands.

Islands that border this sea are the Lesser Sunda Islands and Celebes (Sulawesi).

=== Extent ===
The sea is 5,140 metres (16,860 feet) deep. The International Hydrographic Organization (IHO) defines the Flores Sea as one of the waters of the East Indian Archipelago. The IHO defines its limits as follows:

On the North. The South coast of Celebes [Sulawesi] from the West point of Laikang Bay (5°37′S 119°30′E) to Tanjong Lassa (120°28'E).

On the East. The Western limit of the Banda Sea between Flores and Celebes [a line from Flores' Northern point (8°04′S 122°52′E) to Kalaotoa Island (7°24′S 121°52′E) and through the chain of islands lying between it and the South point of Pulo Salayar, through this island and across the Strait to Tanjong Lassa, Celebes (5°37′S 120°28′E)].

On the South. The North coasts of Flores, Komodo, Banta, and a line to Tanjong Naroe the Northeast point of Soembawa, thence along its North coast to Tanjong Sarokaja (8°22′S 117°10′E).

On the West. A line from Tg Sarokaja to the Western Paternoster island (7°26′S 117°08′E) thence to the Northeastern Postiljon Island (6°33′S 118°49′E) and to the West point of Laikang Bay, Celebes.
