= Asmoredjo =

Asmoredjo is an Indonesian surname. Notable people with the surname include:

- Djufrie Asmoredjo, Indonesian politician
- Reinier Asmoredjo (born 1962), Surinamese painter
