= Pasaribu =

Batak surname originating in Indonesia

Pasaribu is one of Toba Batak clans originating in North Sumatra, Indonesia. People of this clan bears the clan's name as their surname. Notable people of this clan include:

- Amir Pasaribu (1915–2010), composer, pianist and cellist
- Felisha Pasaribu (born 2005), Indonesian badminton player
- Kria Fahmi Pasaribu (1951-2017), Indonesian diplomat
- Masinton Pasaribu (born 1971), politician
- Norman Erikson Pasaribu (born 1990), writer
- Panusunan Pasaribu (1946–2020), politician
