= 2018 Sikka regency election =

Indonesian election

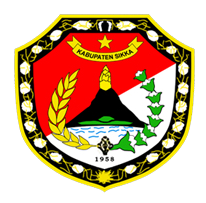
- 27 June 2018
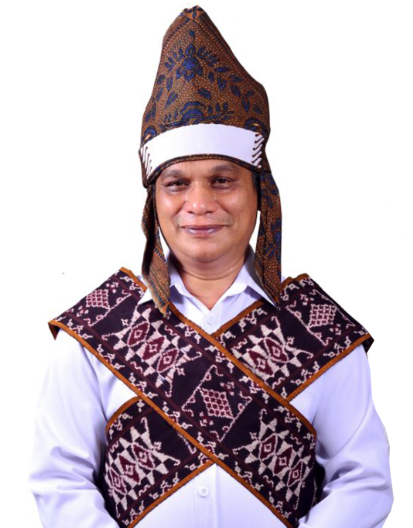

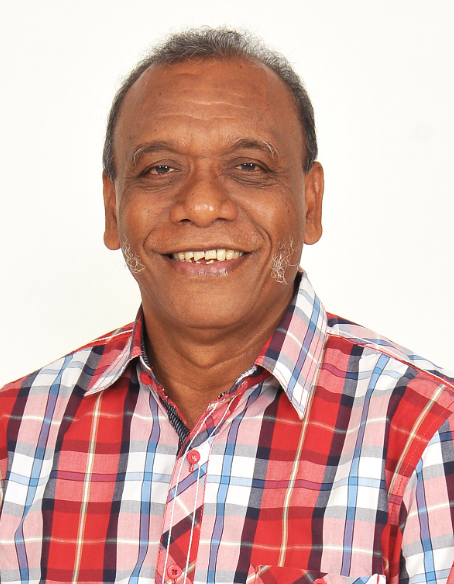

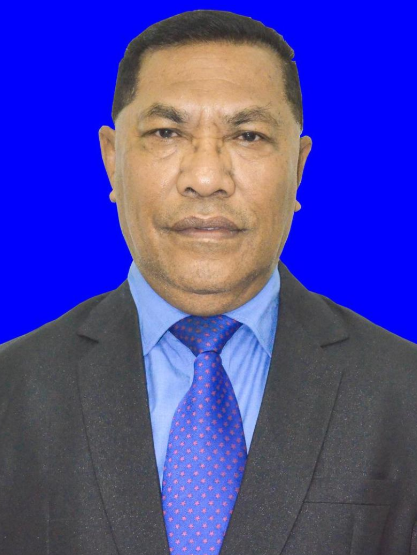
Candidate	Fransiskus Roberto Diogo	Alexander Longginus	Yoseph Ansar Rera
Party	Independent	PDI-P	NasDem
Running mate	Romanus Woga	Fransiskus Stephanus Say	Rafael Raga
Popular vote	63,039	49,690	44,476
Percentage	40.10%	31.61%	28.29%
Regent before election
Yoseph Ansar Rera
Gerindra
Elected Regent
Fransiskus Roberto Diogo
PDI-P

The 2018 Sikka regency election was held on 27 June 2018 as part of Indonesia's nationwide local elections to elect the regent of Sikka Regency, East Nusa Tenggara, for a five-year term. Civil servant and independent candidate Fransiskus Roberto Diogo defeated incumbent regent Yoseph Ansar Rera and 2003–2008 regent Alexander Longginus.

== Electoral system ==
The election, like other local elections in 2018, follow the first-past-the-post system where the candidate with the most votes wins the election, even if they do not win a majority. It is possible for a candidate to run uncontested, in which case the candidate is still required to win a majority of votes "against" an "empty box" option. Should the candidate fail to do so, the election will be repeated on a later date.

== Candidates ==
The incumbent regent of Sikka and chairman of Nasdem's Sikka branch, Yoseph Ansar Rera, took part in the election for a second term. His running mate, Rafael Raga, is the chairman of Golkar's local branch. They originated from different sub-ethnicities in Sikka, with Rera hailing from Sikka's southern regions while Raga came from the east. Their candidacies received the endorsement of Nasdem, Golkar, PKPI, PKS, and PPP. Rera had previously taken part in Sikka's 2003, 2008, and 2013 elections, being elected vice regent in 2003, disqualified in 2008, and winning in 2013.

Alexander Longginus, Sikka's regent from 2003 to 2008, also contested the election. Longginus chaired the Indonesian Democratic Party of Struggle (PDI-P)'s Sikka branch, and previously had Rera as his running mate in 2003 though the two ran on separate tickets in 2008 (with Longginus losing to Sosimus Mitang). His running mate, Fransiskus Stephanus Say, is a Gerindra politician who had served in the local legislature since 2008. Longginus and Say similarly originated from different parts of Sikka, with Longginus coming from the regency seat of Maumere while Say originated from the eastern part of Sikka. They received party endorsements from PDI-P, Gerindra, and PAN.

The other candidate, Fransiskus Roberto Diogo, had previously taken part in the 2008 (as a running mate) and 2013 elections, losing in both. He is the son of Sikka's regent in 1993–1998 Alexander Idong. He ran in the election with Romanus Woga as running mate, and although the pair received the endorsement of the National Awakening Party and Hanura, opted to register as an independent candidate.

== Campaign ==
Throughout the campaigning for the election, the three candidates set up campaign posts at the regency's roads (minus urban streets), with Kompas noting that "almost every road in [Sikka] had campaign posts". The posts were largely distributed along the candidates' bases of support.

With Sikka being one of the poorest regions in the province, a major campaign issue was poverty alleviation and economic development. Rera campaigned on the promotion of tourism and small businesses, Longginus focused on bureaucratic reform and infrastructure buildup, while Diogo emphasized the expansion of municipal water and electrical coverage. A public debate between the candidates was held in Maumere on 1 June 2018.

== Results ==
Candidate	Running mate	Candidate party	Votes	%
Fransiskus Roberto Diogo	Romanus Woga	Independent	49,651	43.70
Alexander Longginus	Fransiskus Stephanus Say	PDI-P	40,415	35.57
Yoseph Ansar Rera	Rafael Raga	Nasdem	23,553	20.73
Total			113,619	100.00

Diogo and Woga were sworn in on 20 September 2018.
