= Alexander Longginus =

Indonesian politician

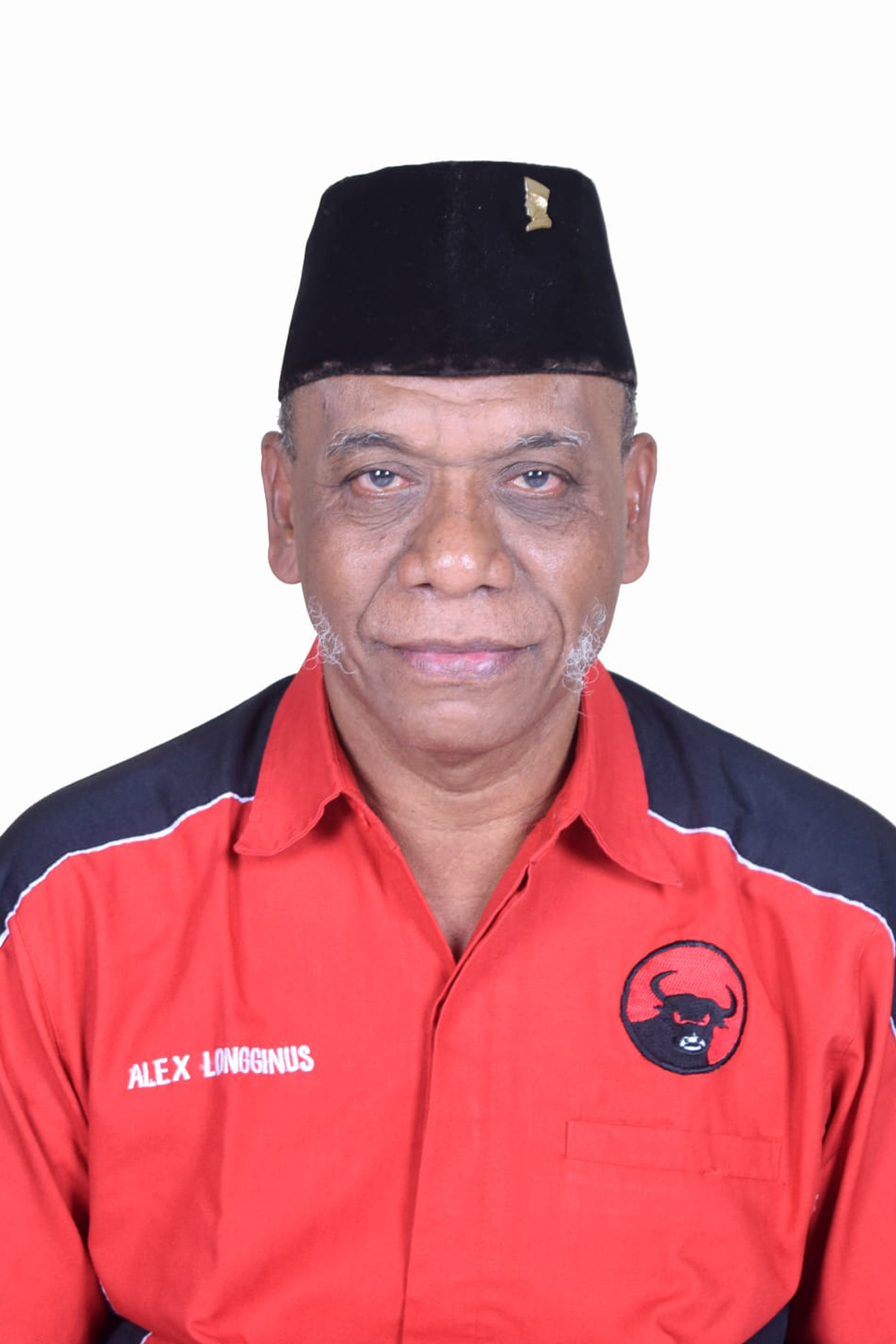
- 2023 portrait

Regent of Sikka
- In office 31 May 2003 – 31 May 2008
- Preceded by: Paulus Moa
- Succeeded by: Sosimus Mitang

Personal details
- Born: 25 January 1960 (age 66) Sikka, East Nusa Tenggara, Indonesia
- Party: PDI-P

Alexander Longginus (born 25 January 1960) is an Indonesian politician of the Indonesian Democratic Party of Struggle who served as the regent of Sikka Regency, East Nusa Tenggara from 2003 to 2008, and a member of its municipal legislature from 1999–2003 and 2009–2014. He had unsuccessfully contested for a second term as regent in 2008, 2013, and 2018.

== Career ==
Alexander Longginus was born on 25 January 1960 at the village of Riit in Sikka Regency. Prior to entering politics, he had worked as a teacher at a Catholic high school in Maumere, as a hotel manager, and then for the non-profit Kasimo Foundation.

Longginus then joined the Indonesian Democratic Party, becoming one of the party's candidates in the 1992 election for East Nusa Tenggara's Regional House of Representatives. In 1999, he was elected into Sikka's Regional House of Representatives (DPRD) as a PDI-P member. In 2000, he was considered a potential candidate to lead PDI-P's East Nusa Tenggara branch, but he failed to appear to the party conference and Frans Lebu Raya was elected instead.

He was elected regent of Sikka by Sikka DPRD, and was sworn in on 31 May 2003. During his time as regent, he made efforts to start an institute of higher education in Sikka, and the Nusa Nipa University was founded in 2004 using Sikka's municipal funds. He would later receive a doctorate in marketing from Nusa Nipa. Longginus also pushed for the creation of a government database for policymaking purposes, which had been absent prior to his term. He ran for reelection in Sikka's first direct regency election in 2008, securing 37,661 votes (25.54%) and placing second behind Sosimus Mitang.

=== Post-regent ===
After his tenure as regent ended, Longginus was arrested in March 2009 under charges of corruption and was held in Maumere prison for some time. He was found not guilty in November 2009 and was released. However, the Supreme Court of Indonesia ordered an investigation into judges at Maumere's District Court related to the ruling, as other suspects in the same case were found guilty. He was elected into Sikka DPRD again in the 2009 election and served another term. During the 2014 Indonesian presidential election, he led the campaign team of Joko Widodo in Sikka.

Longginus made another attempt for a second term in Sikka's 2013 election with Fransiskus Roberto Diogo as his running mate. The pair placed first in the first round with 28.2 percent of votes, but the election proceeded to a runoff where Longginus and Diogo was defeated by Yoseph Ansar Rera. He ran again in the 2018 regency election, again placing second after securing 49,690 votes (31.6%) with Diogo being elected regent. In 2024, Longginus ran for a seat in the provincial legislature of East Nusa Tenggara as a PDI-P candidate, but was not elected.

== Personal life ==
Longginus is married to Gorety, and the couple has five children.
