= 1992 Indonesian legislative election =

- 9 June 1992

400 of the 500 seats in the House of Representatives (Note: The remaining 100 seats consisted of unelected members of the Indonesian National Armed Forces (ABRI), who were directly appointed by the government.) 201 seats needed for a majority
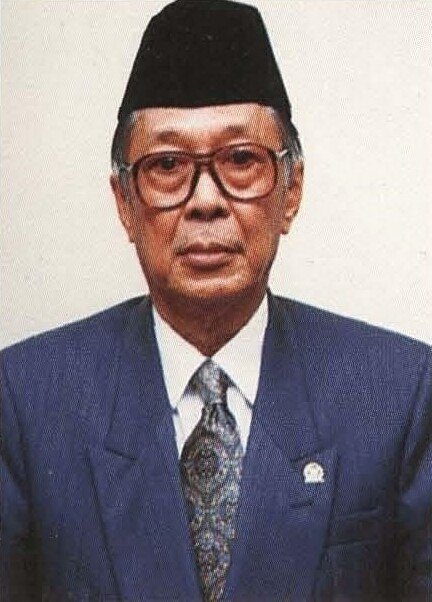

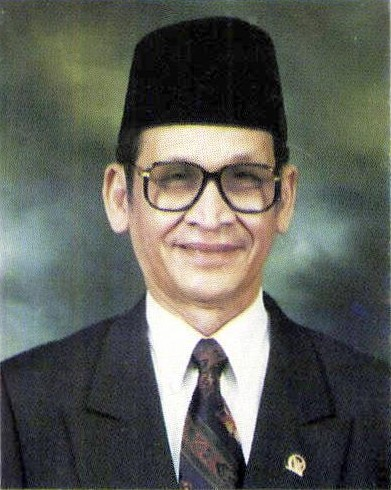

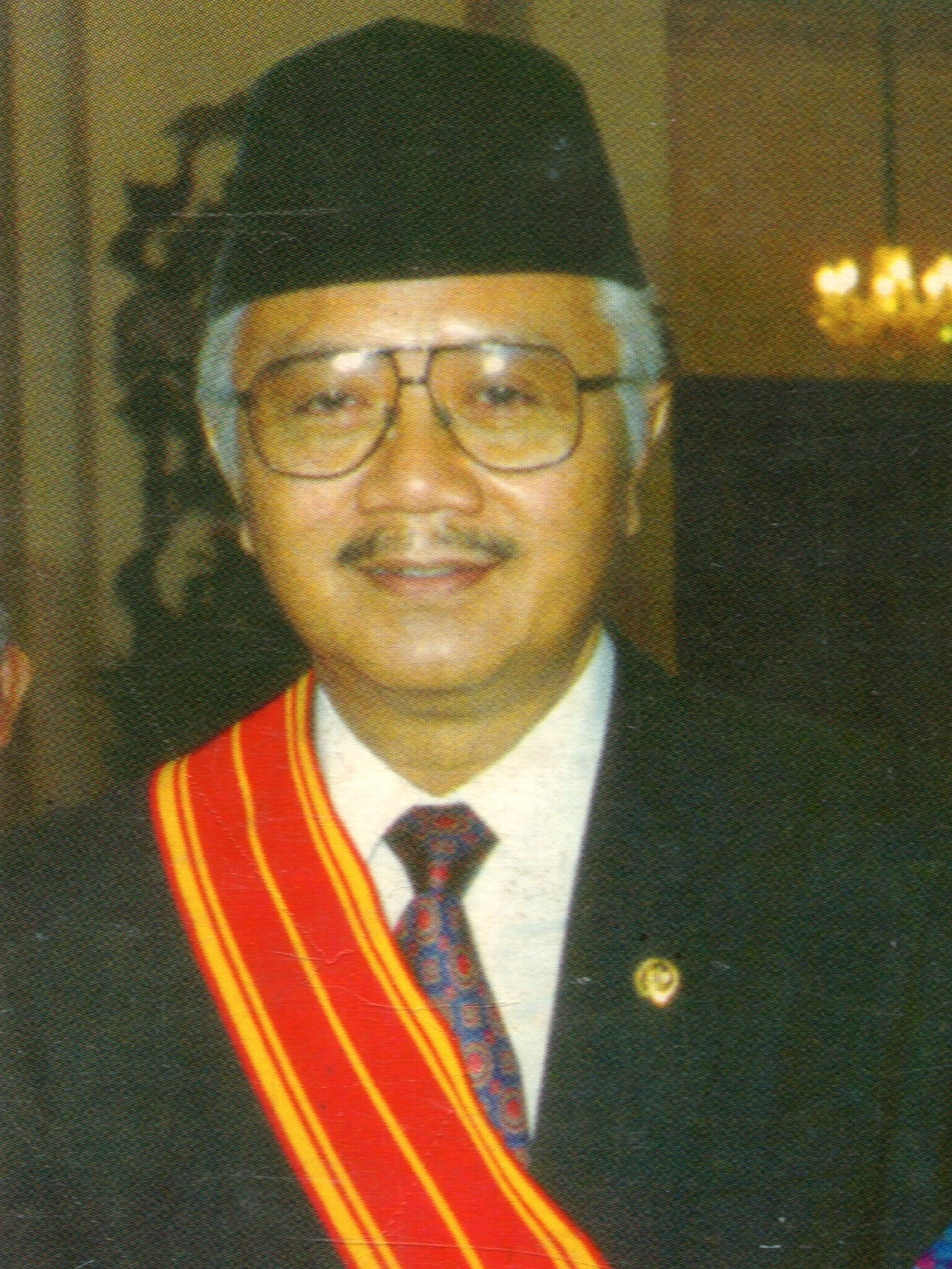
	First party	Second party	Third party
Leader	Wahono	Ismail Hasan Metareum	Suryadi
Party	Golkar	PPP	PDI
Last election	73.11%, 299 seats	15.96%, 61 seats	10.93%, 40 seats
Seats won	282	62	56
Seat change	▼17	▲1	▲16
Popular vote	66,599,331	16,624,647	14,565,556
Percentage	68.10%	17.00%	14.89%
Swing	▼5.01pp	▲1.04pp	▲3.96pp
- Results by electoral district
Speaker before election
Kharis Suhud
Golkar
Elected Speaker
Wahono
Golkar

Legislative elections were held in Indonesia on 9 June 1992, to select 400 of the 500 members of the People's Representative Council (DPR). The election was the sixth legislative elections since Indonesian independence and the fifth legislative elections under the New Order regime of president Suharto. The election resulted in a clear victory for Golkar, which retained its status as the ruling party, although the opposition, under the United Development Party (PPP) and the Indonesian Democratic Party (PDI), saw their vote shares rise.

Golkar had governed Indonesia since 1971, winning four consecutive elections. However, by the late 1980s, it had struggled with internal division, between the military wing and the civil and bureaucratic wing, as well as demands for more openness in government. The opposition, led mainly by the Islamic PPP and the nationalistic PDI began to take advantage of public dissatisfaction with Golkar, though were careful in portraying themselves as not an opposition force.

The election campaign began on 10 May and ended on 3 June, with a six-day election silence up until election day on 9 June. Golkar ran a campaign based on stability and economic progress, with a priority in fighting corruption and re-electing Suharto to a fifth term. The PPP's campaign was centered on building a pro-people economy and bringing about social justice, while the PDI's was based on imposing term limits on the president, tougher sentences for corruption and an end to monopolies.

The polls closed on election day, but the results were only released on 29 June. Golkar, like in all other elections during the New Order, won an outright majority. Defeating the PPP and the PDI, by more than 50 millions votes. However, the opposition managed to make gains, gaining 5% of the vote and 17 seats from Golkar. The election was the first ever election to be covered by private television channels, since Indonesia began the broadcast of private television stations in 1989, with a joint partnership between the private RCTI and SCTV channels, airing along the government-owned TVRI's national coverage.

== Background ==
=== Internal struggles ===
Following the events of the 30 September Movement, and the rise of Suharto, Indonesia came under what would become known as the New Order. The first election under Suharto's New Order regime took place in 1971, and saw the Golkar organization, a federation of Non-governmental organizations which was transformed it into a political vehicle, winning an absolute majority. In 1973, the parties were reorganized into just three, Suharto's Golkar, the Islamist United Development Party (PPP), and the nationalist Indonesian Democratic Party (PDI). Throughout the rest of the New Order elections, Golkar continuously won elections, defeating both the PPP and the PDI. Under the leadership of Sudharmono, Golkar reached its then peak electorally, when it won more than 72% of the popular vote. But cracks were beginning to show, as division grew between its civil and bureaucratic wing and its military wing under the Indonesian National Armed Forces (ABRI). In 1988, Wahono became chairman of Golkar due to support from the military, the first time in which ABRI demonstrated their political power against Suharto.

The PPP was founded in 1973, after a merger of a collection of Islamic and Islamist political parties. The party suffered through internal struggles in the 1970s, but managed to become the main opposition to the New Order, putting up a heavy fight against Golkar in the 1977 and 1982 legislative elections. But by 1987, following the withdrawal of the Nahdlatul Ulama (NU) from the party, its vote share had started to fall. (Note: For further information, see United Development Party.) The PDI was formed in 1973, as a merger of five different political parties. Throughout the history of the party, the PDI was faction-ridden and riven with personality disputes. Following chaos at the third party congress, which failed to select a party chairman, the politician Suryadi was appointed chairman by the Ministry of Home Affairs. Though his nomination was controversial, he nevertheless led the PDI in the 1992 elections. (Note: For further information, see Indonesian Democratic Party.)

=== Run-up to the campaign ===
In the run up to the election, the PPP worked hard to position itself as a party that was not extreme in its outlook, and that was not an opposition force, in an effort to bring about an open and participative political culture in which the party would play a more meaningful political role. Long before the election campaign, the PPP had decided on President Suharto as its presidential candidate for the 1993-1998 term. Since its 1996 Congress, the PDI had striven to increase party unity and put an end to the internal party conflict within the party. It tried to position itself as the party of the "little people" to take advantage of public dissatisfaction. It also tried to portray itself as the most nationalistic party and raised issues such as social inequality and emphasized its anti-foreign aid stance. The party also began to appear more vocal in parliament, which was demonstrated during the debate on the 1992 national budget. Golkar had its share of internal problems, mainly caused by the fact it was a more complex organization than the two political parties, resulting in sometimes poor coordination between the center and the branches in provinces such as Riau, West Kalimantan, and North Sulawesi. It also faced demands for more openness and to respect human rights.

== Election campaign ==
=== Golkar campaign ===
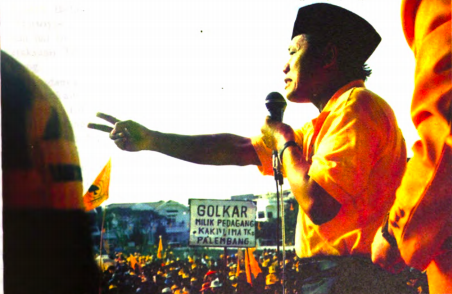
Golkar campaigner appearing in front of a crowd at Hatta Square, Palembang, South Sumatra

Under the leadership of Wahono, who had been elected chairman of Golkar in the 1988 Golkar National Conference, Golkar's largest challenge ahead of the 1992 elections, was in retaining its large 73.11% victory it had received in 1987. Its biggest threat to accomplishing this goal was the PDI, under the leadership of Suryadi, which had begun to increasingly use the symbols of former president Sukarno to gain support. Golkar's 1992 campaign began with a kick-off rally in Surabaya, East Java, to excite and get out the vote for Golkar. During the campaign, Golkar mainly campaigned on stability and the economy, with party spokesman and former party vice chairman Sarwono Kusumaatmadja arguing that it was difficult to bring about change without risking the unity of the nation, and that the priority of the nation should be to build a strong economic basis.

Another party spokesman, Sudomo, said that the priorities of Golkar for the next five years were to improve quality in all aspects by developing human resources, to fight against the excesses of deviations from development such as corruption and illegal levies, to build openness and Pancasila democracy together with legal certainty, and to persuade president Suharto to stand for the presidency for another five-year term. Golkar ended its campaign on 3 June 1992, with a rally in Surabaya, East Java, where the campaign had previously been launched.

=== PPP campaign ===
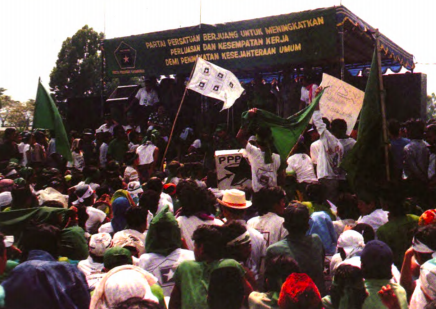
United Development Party campaign, 1992

At the beginning of the PPP's campaign in Jakarta on 10 May, senior party official Djufrie Asmoredjo again stated that the PPP would nominate Suharto for the presidency, with General Try Sutrisno as his deputy. On the same day, PPP chairman Ismail Hasan Metareum said that the party would work to improve the lot of the disadvantaged by building a pro-people economy and bringing about social justice. On 29 May, he said the PPP must win a majority of the vote in Jakarta, and reminded supporters to vote for the party. Ending the party's campaign in Semarang on 3 June, secretary general Matori Abdul Djalil read a five-part political statement calling on people to use their vote and saying that Pancasila was the only basis for society.

=== PDI campaign ===
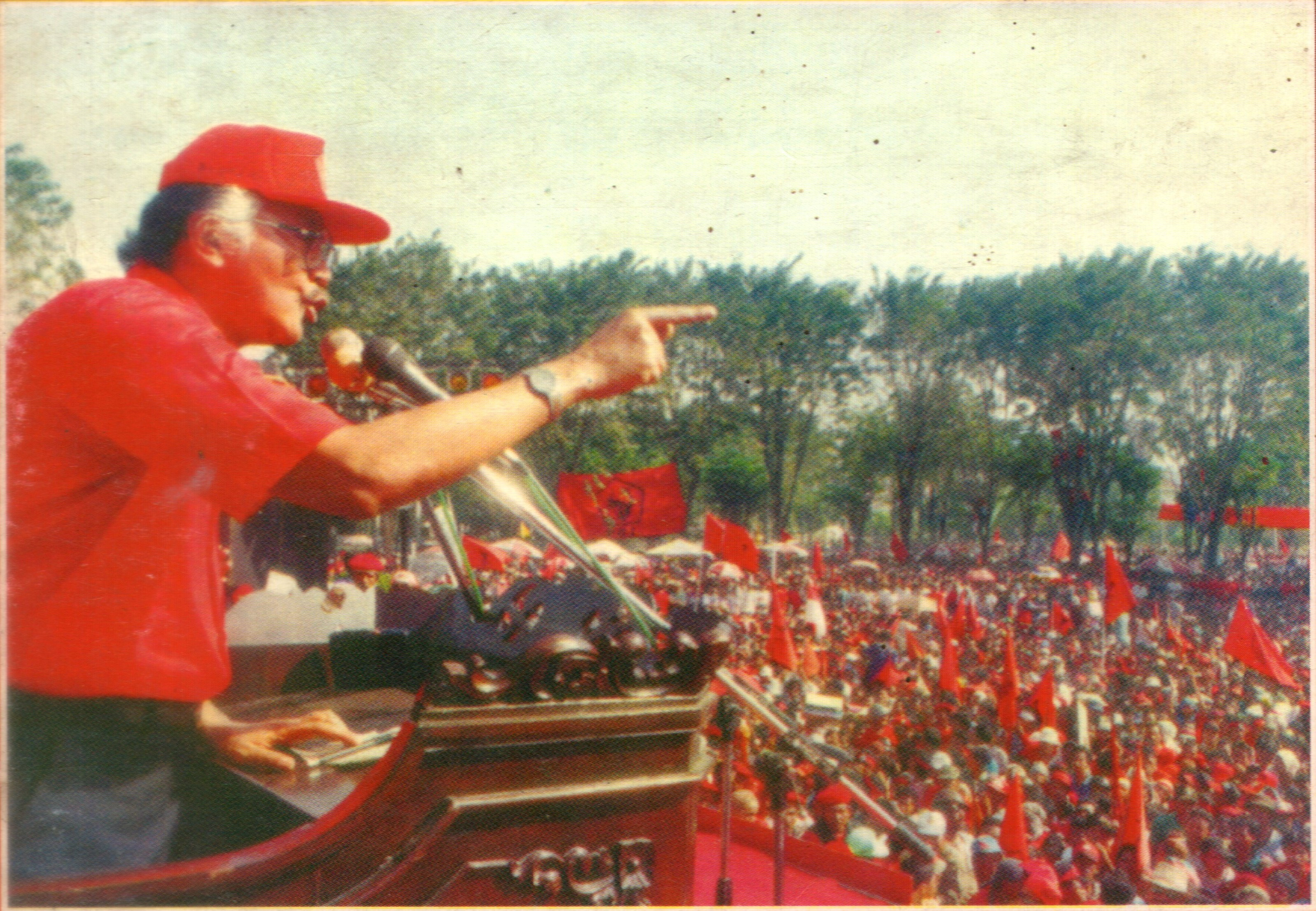
PDI chairman Suryadi campaigning to a crowd of supporters during a PDI rally

Throughout the history of the party, the Indonesian Democratic Party (PDI) was faction-ridden and riven with personality disputes. Following chaos at the third party congress, which failed to select a party chairman, the politician Suryadi was appointed chairman by the Ministry of Home Affairs. Though his nomination was controversial, he nevertheless led the PDI in the 1992 elections.

During the 1992 campaign itself, Suryadi was to have said that the election was a way of preventing authoritarian government and limiting power of the government. The party also campaigned on imposing term limits on the president, tougher sentences for corruption, an end to monopolies, called for the 1985 law on political parties to be amended to allow the political parties to organize down to the village level, and for an end to the practice of closing down publications which criticized the government. The PDI ended its campaign with a massive rally in Jakarta, reportedly with several million people attending.

== Results ==
Party	Votes	%	+/–	Seats	+/–
Golkar	66,599,331	68.10	–5.01	282	–17
United Development Party	16,624,647	17.00	+1.04	62	+1
Indonesian Democratic Party	14,565,556	14.89	+3.96	56	+16
Appointed members				100	0
Total	97,789,534	100.00	–	500	0
Registered voters/turnout	105,565,697	–			
Source: KPU, IPU

=== By province ===
Province	Golkar			PPP			PDI		
Province	Votes	Seats	%	Votes	Seats	%	Votes	Seats	%
Aceh	1,063,623	6	58.4%	628,508	3	34.5%	128,027	1	7.0%
North Sumatra	3,622,891	16	71.2%	553,846	2	10.8%	904,966	4	17.8%
West Sumatra	1,787,435	11	82.0%	553,846	2	25.4%	76,421	1	3.5%
Riau	1,311,893	5	76.5%	245,536	1	14.3%	156,227	1	9.1%
Jambi	992,438	6	90.6%	53,463	0	4.8%	48,469	0	4.4%
South Sumatra	2,260,716	9	70.2%	384,040	2	12.0%	573,657	2	17.8%
Bengkulu	544,529	4	86.0%	36,389	0	5.7%	51,728	0	8.1%
Lampung	2,887,420	10	90.4%	118,761	0	3.7%	185,823	1	5.8%
Jakarta	2,596,286	8	54.4%	1,136,110	3	23.8%	1,039,123	3	21.8%
West Java (Note: Includes the province of Banten, which didn't exist at the time.)	13,387,077	43	70.5%	2,836,243	9	14.9%	2,769,952	9	14.5%
Central Java	8,606,820	32	55.4%	3,556,412	13	22.9%	3,355,268	12	21.6%
Yogyakarta	986,517	4	58.5%	343,803	1	20.4%	353,209	1	21.0%
East Java	11,073,118	36	58.8%	4,746,782	16	25.2%	3,006,100	10	16.0%
West Kalimantan	1,050,112	5	63.9%	240,221	1	14.6%	354,253	2	21.5%
Central Kalimantan	677,245	5	86.2%	61,358	1	7.8%	46,442	0	6.0%
East Kalimantan (Note: Includes the province of North Kalimantan, which didn't exist at the time.)	568,302	4	61.5%	165,035	1	17.8%	190,842	1	20.6%
South Kalimantan	994,298	7	69.6%	300,457	2	21.0%	132,694	1	9.3%
Bali	1,348,153	6	78.5%	34,225	0	2.0%	335,550	2	19.5%
West Nusa Tenggara	1,303,310	5	78.5%	183,427	1	11.0%	173,580	1	10.4%
East Nusa Tenggara	1,615,130	11	91.2%	32,610	0	1.8%	123,026	1	7.0%
East Timor	305,930	3	82.6%	5,291	0	1.4%	59,077	1	16.0%
South Sulawesi	3,424,003	21	89.7%	294,214	2	7.7%	95,814	0	2.5%
Central Sulawesi	751,662	3	80.8%	102,009	1	11.0%	76,885	0	8.2%
North Sulawesi	1,313,421	6	88.2%	66,717	0	4.5%	108,443	1	7.3%
Southeast Sulawesi	668,135	4	94.3%	13,035	0	1.8%	26,978	0	3.8%
Maluku	696,109	4	73.9%	150,982	1	16.0%	95,336	0	10.1%
Irian Jaya	762,758	8	86.6%	21,085	0	2.4%	96,797	1	11.0%
Appointed seats	–	100	–	–	0	–	–	0	–
Total	66,599,331	282	68.10%	16,624,647	62	17.00%	14,565,556	56	4.02%
Source: Lembaga Pemilihan Umum & Ministry of Foreign Affairs

=== Analysis ===
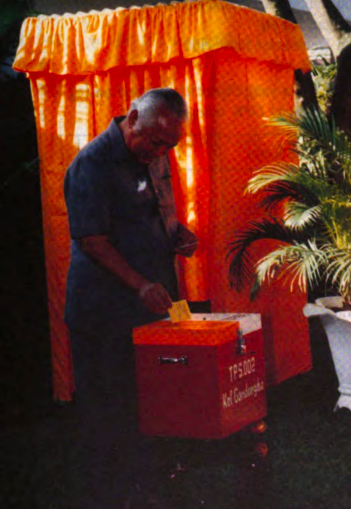
President Suharto places his ballot into the ballot box at TPS 002, Gondangdia Village, Menteng, Central Jakarta, 9 June 1992.

Results showed that the PDI, had the best showing between the three parties. Gaining 16 seats within the DPR, and increasing its share of the popular vote by 4%, mainly from new first time voters. In fact, the PDI gained in almost every single province, with the exception of Jakarta, where its vote share fell from 28.4% to 21.8%, and it obtained representatives in all but Central Kalimantan, South Sulawesi, Central Sulawesi, and Maluku. The PDI also did especially well in its former strongholds, such as North Sumatra, South Sumatra, Yogyakarta, West Kalimantan, East Kalimantan, and Bali. The rise of the PDI was attributed to rising discontent among the populace with the regime, the party's confrontational statements, credibility, and successful efforts in organizing a grass-roots campaign.

The PPP also slightly increased its performance, gaining a single seat overall. The PPP also increased its vote share in Jakarta, replacing the PDI as the second largest party in the capital. This was likely not caused by the PPP's campaign strategy, but instead by the PDI's seemingly vulgar campaign in the capital, which may have driven off moderate voters. The party obtained representatives in all but Lampung, Bali, East Nusa Tenggara, East Timor, North Sulawesi, and Irian Jaya.

== Aftermath ==
Both the PPP and PDI raised complaints over alleged irregularities to the General Elections Institution (LPU). Both parties admitted to Golkar being victorious in the election, but charged that their share of the vote would have risen if there hadn't been any fraud. While the PPP still claimed that the election was a success, the PDI "confronted the government head-on" on the issue. During a PDI meeting with the party's provincial leaders, the party decided that "there had been fraud, manipulation, terror, intimidation, and other criminal acts which had very much damaged the Pancasila democratic process". The PDI meeting also accused both the military and president Suharto of manipulating the election against the PDI, although these accusations weren't published by the media at the time.

In response, Indonesian attorney general Singgih promised an investigation into alleged fraud. The police probed over 100 polling sites in Jakarta alone, and Singgih conceded that while there were some mistakes in the election process. However, he maintained that these errors were merely human errors, not actual fraud. Meanwhile, Coordinating Minister for politics and security, Sudomo, lashed out against these accusations, and threatened that anyone who undermines the integrity of the election will be put in prison for up to five years. When the PDI claimed to have evidence of voting irregularities, Sudomo wrote it off as 'commonplace' and 'a part of politics'.

The PDI eventually complied, and signed the election results. First at the provincial level and then at the national level. There were some controversies, for example, PDI's Jakarta chairman refused to sign the election results, and stormed off. Though he would eventually sign it after private consultations with general Kentot Harsono. Eventually all 27 provincial branches of the PNI had signed the election results, with Suryadi signing the national election results, and downplaying fraud allegations that the PDI had brought up.

== Presidential election ==
Following the legislative election, the People's Consultative Assembly (MPR), the legislative branch of Indonesia, met from 10 to 11 March 1993 to elect both the president and vice president of the country for the 1993–1998 term. On 10 March, Suharto was re-elected president unanimously to a sixth term. Try Sutrisno, an army general, was subsequently elected vice president on the next day. Try Sutrisno's nomination as vice president was contentious, as he was nominated by the Indonesian National Armed Forces (ABRI), without the prior consent of Suharto, then vice president Sudharmono, and Try Sutrisno himself. The nomination of Try Sutrisno was quickly approved by the opposition parties. Suharto, shocked by the sudden decision of the armed forces deputies to nominate their own candidate without waiting for him to nominate his own choice for the office, backed down from any move to restrain them. Try Sutrisno's election as vice president was thus considered as a fait accompli.

== See also ==
- List of political parties in Indonesia
