= Irmawan Emir Wisnandar =

Indonesian diplomat (born 1956)

Ambassador of Indonesia to Laos
- In office 14 February 2014 – 2 December 2017
- Preceded by: Kria Fahmi Pasaribu
- Succeeded by: Pratito Soeharyo

Personal details
- Born: 5 January 1956 (age 70) Surabaya, East Java, Indonesia
- Spouse: Irma Purbawati
- Parent: Wisnu Djajengminardo (father)
- Education: Parahyangan Catholic University (Drs.)

Irmawan Emir Wisnandar (born 5 January 1956) is an Indonesian diplomat who has served in various capacities within the Ministry of Foreign Affairs and on overseas assignments. He served as the Ambassador of Indonesia to Laos from 2014 until 2017. Prior to his ambassadorship, he was the Consul General of Indonesia in Melbourne, Australia, and the Director of ASEAN Functional Cooperation in the foreign ministry.

Irmawan was born in Surabaya, East Java. His father was Wisnu Djajengminardo, an air force officer who commanded the Halim Airbase during the 30 September Movement. Irmawan studied economics at the Parahyangan Catholic University in Bandung before embarking on his diplomatic career, which included postings in Washington, D.C., Songkhla, and Singapore.

== Early life and education ==
Irmawan was born on 5 January 1956 in Surabaya at a pregnancy clinic owned by Achmad Nawir, an obstetrician who was more known as a football player and played for the Dutch East Indies in the 1938 FIFA World Cup. His father, Wisnu Djajengminardo, was an air force officer who was known for commanding the Halim Airbase around the time of the 30 September Movement. Irmawan studied economics at the Parahyangan Catholic University in Bandung. He completed his basic diplomatic education in 1986, mid-level diplomatic education in 1992, and his senior diplomatic education in 2002.

== Diplomatic career ==
Throughout his career, he had served a number of positions within the foreign ministry, including as head of section for Asia-Pacific issues of the directorate general of international economic relations, deputy director (chief of subdirectorate) for reporting section of the secretariat of directorate general of international economic relations, and deputy director for trade goods and services within the directorate of multilateral trade industry of directorate general of economy and development.

Irmawan's first assignment outside Indonesia was as a staff at the embassy in Washington, where he served at the economic section with the rank of second secretary in the 1990s. In late 1996, Irmawan was posted in Songkhla, Thailand, to prepare the opening of the new Indonesian consulate in the city. When the consulate was finally opened on 28 March 1997, Irmawan began his duty as vice consul within the consulate. He was then posted to Singapore sometime in the 2000s, where he headed the embassy's economic section with the rank of counsellor. He later received additional duties as the embassy's head of chancery and acting trade attaché in 2006. During his tenure, Irmawan admitted the embassy's lack of ability in arresting the Bank Indonesia Liquidity Aid embezzlement fugitives who fled to the country, as the fugitives never reported themselves or sought any assistance to the embassy.

By 2008, Irmawan had become the director of ASEAN functional cooperation within the foreign ministry. During his tenure, he metaphorically described ASEAN as a “sexy girl” for Europe and the US due to its resilience against the economic crises in the US and Europe.

On 21 December 2011, Irmawan became the consul general of Indonesia in Melbourne. He received his duties from the consulate general chargé d'affaires ad interim Hadi Sapto Pambrasotoro on 24 January 2012 and introduced himself to the Indonesian community in the region on 11 February 2012.

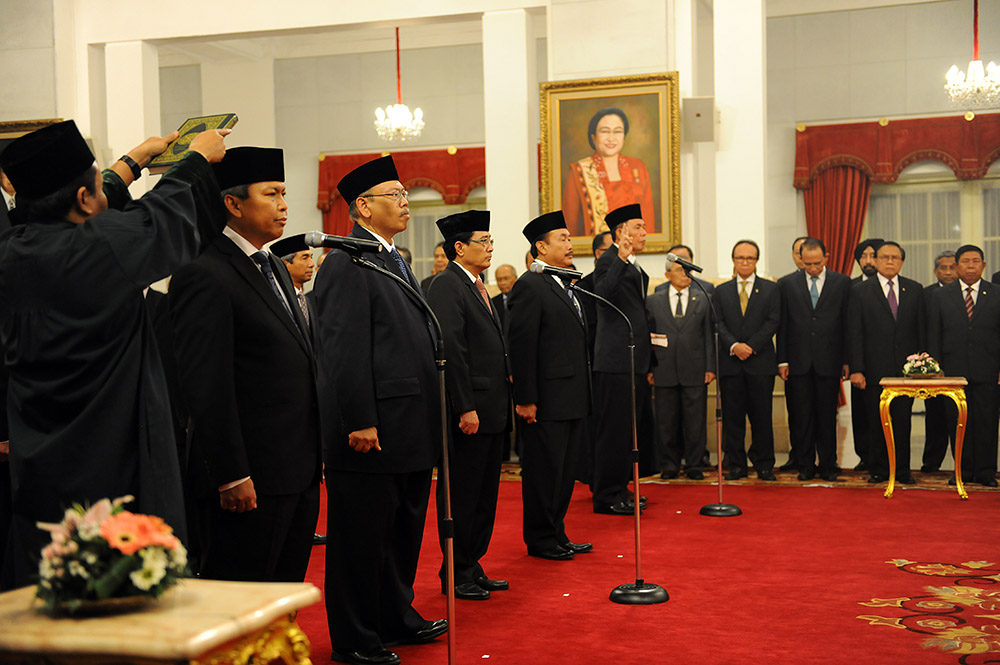
Irmawan (third from left) being sworn in as ambassador on 14 February 2014.

Irmawan was nominated as ambassador to Laos by President Susilo Bambang Yudhoyono on 3 September 2013. He passed assessment by the House of Representative's first commission on the same month and was sworn in on 14 February 2014. He presented his credentials to the President of Laos Choummaly Sayasone on 15 May 2014. During his tenure, Irmawan promoted Indonesia's natural potentials through the Wonderful Indonesia exhibition in 2016. At the end of his ambassadorial term, on 24 November 2017 Irmawan received the friendship medal from Laos foreign minister Saleumxay Kommasith. He handed over his duties to the embassy's chargé d'affaires ad interim A. Firman Arif W. Soepalal on 2 December 2017.

Irmawan is a recipient of the Civil Servants' Long Service Medal, 3rd class and 2nd class.

== Personal life ==
Irmawan is married to Irma Purbawati. Irmawan is a Muslim.
