= Paulus Moa =

Indonesian politician (1940–2023)

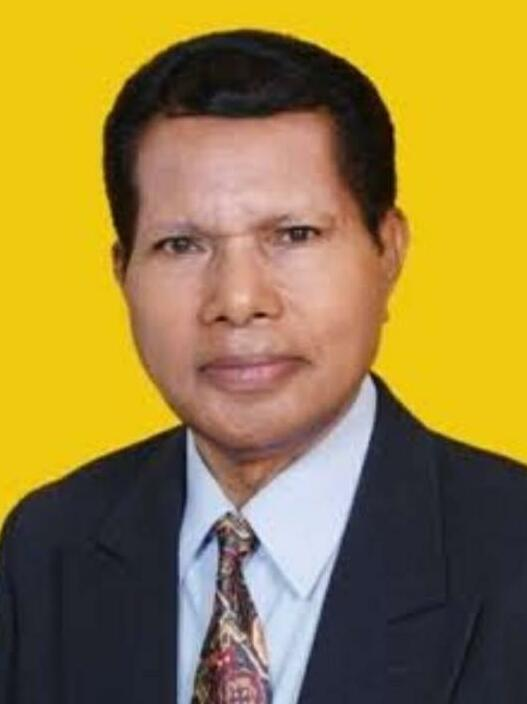

Deputy Speaker of East Nusa Tenggara Regional People's Representative Council
- In office 2004–2009
- Governor: Pieter Alexander Tallo
- Speaker: Melkianus Adoe

Regent of Sikka
- In office 22 May 1998 – 22 May 2003
- Preceded by: Alexander Idong
- Succeeded by: Alexander Longginus

Member of East Nusa Tenggara Regional People's Representative Council
- In office 2004–2014

Regent of Manufahi (acting)
- In office 9 April 1994 – 11 July 1994
- Governor: José Abílio Osório Soares
- Preceded by: Nazario Tilman de Andrade
- Succeeded by: Nazario Tilman de Andrade

Personal details
- Born: 10 September 1940 Wolokoli, Bola, Sikka, Dutch East Indies
- Died: 6 May 2023 (aged 82) Maumere, East Nusa Tenggara, Indonesia
- Spouse: Gerardiana P. Moa
- Children: 4
- Education: Institute of Governance Sciences (Drs.)

Paulus Moa (10 September 1940 – 6 May 2023) was an Indonesian bureaucrat and politician. He was the acting regent of Manufahi in the now-dissolved province of East Timor in 1994, regent of Sikka from 1998 until 2003, and the deputy speaker of East Nusa Tenggara Regional People's Representative Council from 2004 until 2009.

== Early life ==
Moa was born on 10 September 1940 in Wolokoli, a small village in Sikka, Dutch East Indies. He began his education at a Catholic primary school in his village and completed it in 1955. His parents then sent him to the Yapenthom Junior High School in Maumere, the capital of Sikka. His classmates in Yapenthom include future student activist and newspaper manager Robert Puang Sunur.

Moa completed his junior high school education in 1959. Moa, along with Sunur and several classmates, continued their education to Ende, a regency hundreds of kilometers away from Sikka. He then studied at the Syuradikara Catholic High School and graduated in 1962. Upon completing his high school education, he studied governance sciences at the Kupang Home Governance Academy (Akademi Pemerintahan Dalam Negeri, APDN).

== Career ==
Moa began his career in September 1964 as the head of the village development bureau in his hometown in Sikka. In November of the same year, he was appointed the head of the Bola sub-district. He led the sub-district for around two years until September 1966. He then returned to Sikka, where he became the head of the legal and governance bureau.

After several years working in his hometown, Moa was sent to Irian Jaya (now Papua), where he became the head of the Nimboran District. He held the office until 1975 and was sent to Jakarta to study at the Institute of Governance Sciences. He graduated from the institute with a doctorandus in 1979.

Around the time of the graduation, the Indonesian military has just annexed East Timor as its province. As the region lacked competent bureaucrats, experienced civil servants from other regions were sent to East Timor. Moa was one of the civil servants who was sent to East Timor. He was assigned to the Viqueque Municipality, where he became assistant to the local district chief. He assumed this post on 28 March 1979 and served until 23 January 1983.

Upon the end of his stint as assistant, Moa became the regional secretary in various regions in East Timor. He was the regional secretary of the Bobonaro Regency from 20 March 1983 until 19 April 1983, the Dili city from 24 April 1983 until 26 December 1986, the Manufahi Regency from 27 December 1986 until 16 May 1995, and the Liquiçá Regency from 17 May 1995 until 21 May 1998. During his tenure in the Manufahi Municipality, Moa briefly became the acting regent for around three months in 1994. He was nominated by the local parliament as a definitive regent, but did not compete in the final election.

== Political career ==
In early 1998, while serving as the regional secretary of the Liquiçá regency, Moa was nominated as a candidate for the Regent of Sikka. However, Moa's name was not mentioned during parliamentary lobbies with the East Nusa Tenggara governor, prompting protests from the local populace. Moa's name was eventually added as a nominee by the local parliament following pressures from the governor. At the internal election held on 22 April 1998, Moa won 13 of 25 parliamentary votes, defeating incumbent regent Alexander Idong who only obtained seven votes.

As the Regent of Sikka, Moa introduced a seven-point program that included improving human resources, reducing poverty, improving the environment and spatial planning, utilizing agricultural land, developing agribusiness and agroindustry, improving cooperative programs and developing tourism. During his tenure, he increased the income of Sikka Regency from 2.2 billion to 7 billion and continued the rehabilitation program for the damages that occurred in Sikka due to the 1992 Flores earthquake and tsunami. He also established cooperation with Australian Aid for marine park conservation and with UNICEF for breastfeeding programs in maternal and child health.

Moa's five-year term ended on 22 May 2003. He was nominated for the Nusa Tenggara Regional People's Representative Council in the 2004 Indonesian legislative election. He was elected to the council and became its deputy speaker. Shortly after becoming deputy speaker, Moa was elected as the deputy chairman of Golkar in East Nusa Tenggara. He was reelected for a second term in the 2009 Indonesian legislative election, but failed to retain his deputy speakership.

During his first term as parliament member, Moa became the running mate of Ibrahim Agustinus Medah, former Regent of Kupang, in the 2008 East Nusa Tenggara gubernatorial elections. The pair, who nicknamed themselves Tulus (an acronym of their last names), promised free healthcare and education as well as the development of people's economy. During the gubernatorial campaigns, the pair received black campaigns from their opponents, including Moa, who was accused of falsifying his APDN diploma. Tulus was also accused of proselytizing East Nusa Tenggara from a Christian-majority province into a Muslim province. Tulus eventually lost the election, winning in only several regions native to the candidates such as Sikka and Kupang.

Upon the end of his term as parliament member, Moa ran as a candidate for the Regional Representative Council in the 2014 Indonesian legislative election. Moa only won the votes in Kupang and failed to obtain a majority of votes in East Nusa Tenggara.

Moa ran again as a legislative candidate for the People's Representative Council in the 2019 Indonesian general election. He changed his party allegiance from Golkar to Hanura. He ran as a candidate from the East Nusa Tenggara 1 electoral district, which covers regencies in the Timor island. He failed to win the election.

== Personal life and death ==
Moa was a Roman Catholic. He was married to Gerardiana P. Moa, with whom he had four children.

Moa died in Maumere on 6 May 2023, at age 82.
