= Fransiskus Roberto Diogo =

Indonesian civil servant and politician

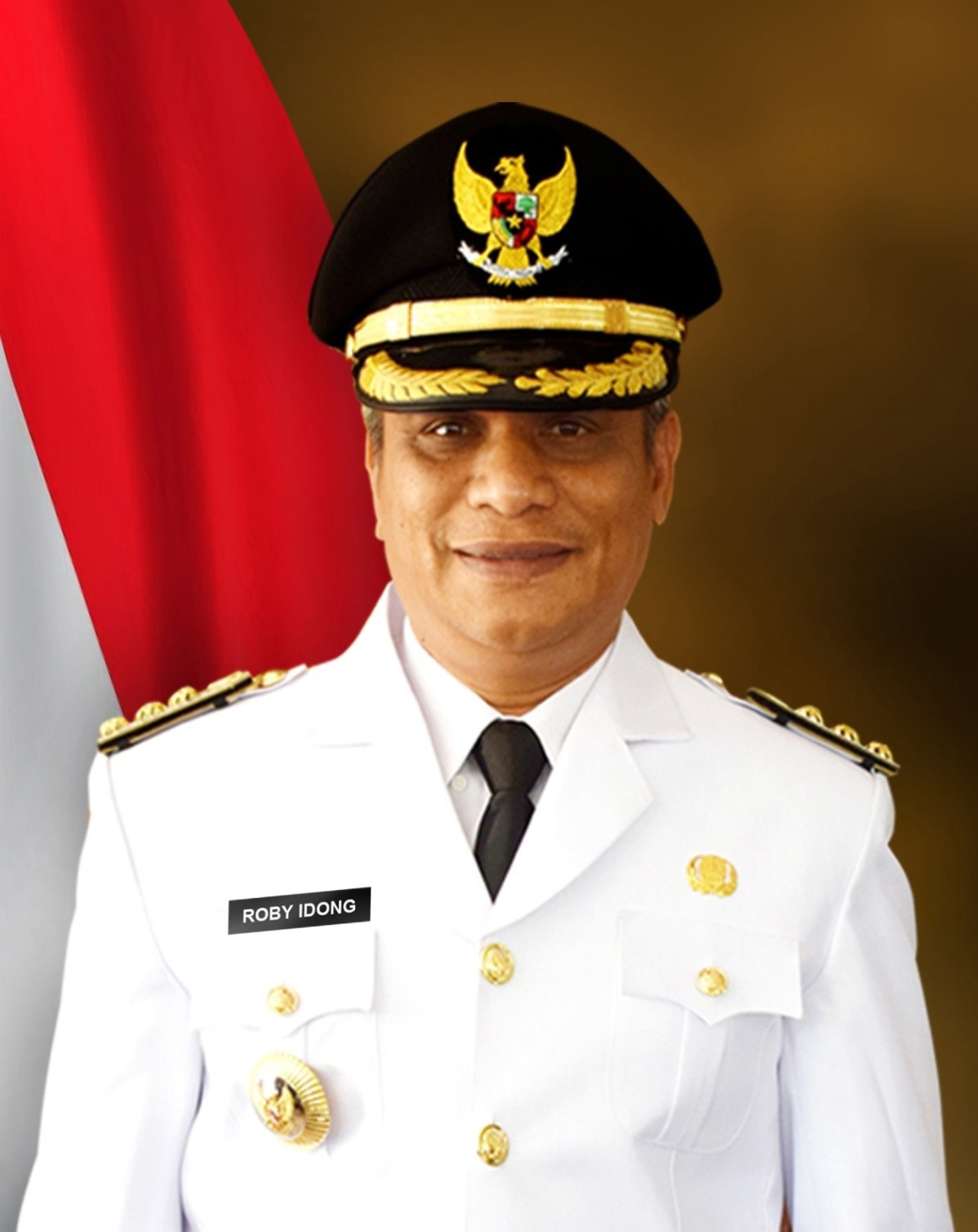

Regent of Sikka
- In office 20 September 2018 – 20 September 2023
- Preceded by: Yoseph Ansar Rera
- Succeeded by: Adrianus Firminus (act.); Juventus Prima Yoris Kago

Personal details
- Born: 1 February 1972 (age 54) Maumere, East Nusa Tenggara, Indonesia
- Party: PDI-P

Fransiskus Roberto Diogo (born 1 February 1972), popularly known as Robi Idong, is an Indonesian former civil servant and politician of the Indonesian Democratic Party of Struggle. He served as the regent of Sikka Regency, East Nusa Tenggara between 2018 and 2023.

== Early life and education ==
Diogo was born in Maumere, the regency seat of Sikka Regency, on 1 February 1972. His father, Alexander Idong, was the regent of Sikka from 1993 to 1998. After completing elementary (1985) and middle school (1988) in Maumere, he went to high school at the town of Ende, graduating in 1991, before studying at the Institute of Home Affairs Governance in West Java. He would later obtain bachelor's and master's degrees in public administration from Brawijaya University in 1999 and 2001 respectively.

== Career ==
He worked as a civil servant in Sikka's municipal government, eventually heading the municipal fire service and police unit. He had previously made unsuccessful runs as in the 2008 and 2013 regency elections, as a regent candidate in 2008 and vice-regent candidate in 2013. In 2013, as running mate of 2003–2008 regent Alexander Longginus, Diogo lost at the runoff with 47.5 percent of votes to Yoseph Ansar Rera despite winning the first round. He continued to work as a civil servant, and in 2014 he was head of Nele district in Sikka.

Diogo resigned from his civil servant position to run again in Sikka's 2018 regency election. He ran as an independent candidate, although he received endorsements from PKB and Hanura. His running mate, Romanus Woga, is a local businessman active in Sikka's cooperatives. His campaign centered around expanding electrical and municipal water coverage in Sikka. In the 2018 election, Diogo won 63,039 votes (40.1%) in a three-way race, defeating Rera and Longginus. Diogo and Woga were sworn in on 20 September 2018.

As regent, Diogo initiated a higher education scholarship program from the municipal government, allocating Rp 5.7 billion (~USD 400,000) in 2019. He also pushed for a municipal investment into the municipal water company (PDAM), which faced some political opposition, and in 2022 he faced a protest from the PDAM's workers when he appointed its new director. He also promoted the cultivation of vanilla and the use of drip irrigation techniques adopted from Israel. Diogo personally owns a vanilla plantation with around 30 thousand plants as of 2022.

By 2019, Diogo had joined the Indonesian Democratic Party of Struggle and was elected chairman of its Sikka branch for the 2019–2024 term. He ran for a second term in 2024 with Martinus Wadon as running mate, but they placed third out of four candidates with 35,454 votes (20.9%), with Juventus Prima Yoris Kago winning the election.

== Personal life ==
Diogo is a Catholic, and he is married to Maria Cahyani Idong. The couple has four children. Maria unsuccessfully ran for a seat in the municipal legislature as a PDI-P candidate in the 2024 election.
