= Corruption charges against Suharto =

Investigation of Indonesian President

Investigations into allegations of corruption against Indonesian former president Suharto began immediately after his 32-year rule.

== History ==
After Suharto's resignation as president, calls for his arrest on the basis of corruption emerged. People's Consultative Assembly decree No. XI/MPR/1998 declared that attempts to eradicate corruption must include investigations into Suharto.

In Global Transparency Report, made by Transparency International in 2004, he was ranked as the world’s most corrupt leader. The report accused Suharto of causing losses of US$15–35 billion for the Indonesian government.

On 12 May 2006, attorney general Abdul Rachman Saleh declared the issuance of the "Termination of Criminal Persecution Decree" (Surat Keputusan Penghentian Penuntutan Pidana, SKP3). The decree suspended all attempts to prosecute Suharto due to his deteriorating health as he was medically unfit to stand trial. The Attorney General's Office suspended the judicial review process for his alleged corruption case.

On 27 January 2008, Suharto died of multiple organ failure in a hospital in Jakarta at the age of 86.

On 25 September 2024, the People's Consultative Assembly/MPR repealed Clause 4 of MPR Resolution No. XI/MPR/1998, which had accused Suharto and his cronies of acts of corruption, collusion, and nepotism (Clause 4 specifically named Suharto). The stated reason for this was because Suharto was never put on trial for these accusations before his death in 2008.

== Charges and Sentencing ==
=== Supersemar Foundation ===
Founded by Suharto on May 16, 1974, the Supersemar Foundation provided scholarships for Indonesian students. The foundation's income came primarily from state-owned banks, with Government Regulation (PP) No. 15/1976 specifying that 50 percent of the remaining 5 percent of net profits from state banks be deposited into the Supersemar Foundation. Based on this PP, the Supersemar Foundation, from 1976 until Suharto's resignation in 1998, received USD 420 million and IDR 185 billion.

In 2015, the Supersemar Foundation was convicted, after several failed attempts to suspend prosecution. This conviction forced the organization to pay Rp4.4 trillion in damages to the state. The foundation had incomes of Rp185 billion embezzled, instead being delivered to Suharto and co-conspirators. IDR 420 billion was distributed to Bank Duta, Rp6.09 quadrillion to Sempati Air, and the rest went to other companies and cooperatives.

== See also ==
- Commission of Four
- Corruption in Indonesia
