= Corruption in Indonesia =

While hard data on corruption are difficult to collect, corruption in Indonesia is seen through public opinion, collated through surveys as well as observation of how each system runs.

Transparency International's 2025 Corruption Perceptions Index, which scored 180 countries on a scale from 0 ("highly corrupt") to 100 ("very clean"), gave Indonesia a score of 34. When ranked by score, Indonesia ranked 109th among the 182 countries in the Index, where the country ranked first is perceived to have the most honest public sector. For comparison with regional scores, the best score among those countries of the Asia Pacific region that appeared in the Index (Note: Afghanistan, Australia, Bangladesh, Bhutan, Brunei Darussalam, Cambodia, China, Fiji, Hong Kong, India, Indonesia, Japan, North Korea, South Korea, Laos, Malaysia, Maldives, Mongolia, Myanmar, Nepal, New Zealand, Pakistan, Papua New Guinea, Philippines, Singapore, Solomon Islands, Sri Lanka, Taiwan, Thailand, Timor-Leste, Vanuatu, Vietnam) was 84, the average score was 45 and the worst score was 15. For comparison with worldwide scores, the best score was 89 (ranked 1), the average score was 42, and the worst score was 9 (ranked 181, in a two-way tie).

There are two key areas in the public sector in which corruption in Indonesia can be found. These are the justice and civil service sectors. Corruption within the justice sector is seen by its ineffectiveness to enforce laws, failure to uphold justice, hence undermining the rule of law. The areas of corruption within this sector include the police and the courts. In the 2008 Public Sector Integrity Survey, the Supreme Court ranked the lowest in integrity in comparison to the other public services in Indonesia. The courts were viewed to make decisions unfairly and have high unofficial costs.

Evidence of corruption within the civil service comes from surveys conducted within the sector. Some surveys found that almost half were found to have received bribes. Civil servants themselves admit to corruption.

In January 2012, it was reported that Indonesia had lost as much as Rp 2.13 trillion (US$238.6 million) to corruption in 2011. A study conducted by Indonesia Corruption Watch, a non-profit organization coordinated by Danang Widoyoko, said that embezzlement accounted for most of the money lost and that “government investment was the sector most prone to graft.”

Companies are concerned about red tape and widespread extortion in the process of obtaining licences and permits, and they often face a demand for irregular fees or concessions based on personal relationships when obtaining government contracts. Companies have also reported regular demand for cash payments and expectations for gifts and special treatment by Indonesian officials.

== Economic and social costs ==
Corruption is an important development challenge that poses economic and social costs in Indonesia. Interference in public laws and policies for the sake of personal or private gain has weakened the competitiveness of Indonesia.

About one-quarter of ministries suffer from budgetary diversions in Indonesia. Households spent approximately 1% while enterprises spent at least 5% of monthly company revenue on unofficial payments. Social costs due to corruption in Indonesia include the weakening of government institutions and the rule of law. Increases in crime due to smuggling and extortion involve the institutions that are supposed to be protecting citizens. The people who suffer most are the poor as they are pressured to finance payments through their already tight budgets and the effectiveness of social services is less accessible indirectly. These concerns were voiced by the poor urban communities of Indonesia themselves in a joint World Bank-Partnership for Governance Reform research project, entitled “Corruption and the Poor”.

== Efforts to curb corruption ==
Anti-corruption efforts began in Indonesia in the 1950s. There have been some efforts to battle corruption with the creation of the ombudsman and the Assets Auditing Commission (KPKPN). It has been an important agenda and part of Indonesia's official reform program since May 1998. However, the efforts made are questionable as there has been limited success in reducing corruption. Some obstacles that impeded the improvement of corruption included political and economic constraints, and the complex nature of the corruption itself.

Following strong criticism of corruption at the beginning of the New Order regime in the late 1960s a Commission of Four was appointed by President Suharto in 1970. The report of the commission noted that corruption was "rampant" but none of the cases it said were in need of urgent action were followed up. Laws were passed in 1999 giving the police and prosecution service the authority to investigate corruption cases.

These efforts have taken the shape of ordering corrupt convicts to pay back all the money they have stolen. On 6 March 2012, the Jakarta Corruption Court sentenced Ridwan Sanjaya, an official from the Ministry of Energy and Mineral Resources, to six years in prison for rigging a tender bid for a home solar energy system project in 2009 worth IDR526 billion (US$57.86 million).

He was found guilty of accepting IDR 14.6 billion in kickbacks, resulting in IDR131 billion in state losses. The Corruption Eradication Commission (KPK) stated that it will use Ridwan's verdict as material to develop the investigation on the graft scandal involving the Solar Home System project.

High-profile corruption scandals involving major banks and financial corporations include the Bank Bali scandal, Bank Indonesia Liquidity Aid, the Century Bank case, and the Jiwasraya scandal.

== Current Administration ==
The administration of President Joko Widodo (2014–2024) faced significant scrutiny regarding the intersection of political power, family ties, and business interests. In 2023, the Constitutional Court (MK) issued a controversial ruling (Decision No. 90/PUU-XXI/2023) that lowered the minimum age requirement for presidential and vice-presidential candidates, allowing Gibran Rakabuming Raka—Jokowi's eldest son—to run as Prabowo Subianto's running mate in the 2024 election. The ruling was widely criticized as an act of judicial intervention by the president to enable his son's candidacy. The Chief Justice of the Constitutional Court at the time, Anwar Usman (Gibran's uncle), was subsequently removed from his position for violating judicial ethics.

Business tycoon Haji Isam (Andi Syamsuddin Arsyad), who served as Deputy Treasurer for Jokowi's 2019 re-election campaign, has been a recurring figure in these discussions. The Jhonlin Group, which he founded, received presidential backing for major projects, including the inauguration of its biodiesel plant and its sugar mill in Bombana, Southeast Sulawesi. In June 2024, Jokowi formalized the establishment of a Special Economic Zone (SEZ) in South Kalimantan, a project initiated by a Jhonlin Group subsidiary. Haji Isam is known to have a close relationship with Jokowi, which has drawn scrutiny given the scale of government support for his ventures and the lack of competitive bidding processes in some cases.

Additionally, Jokowi's decision to shift the Jakarta-Bandung high-speed rail project (Whoosh) from Japan to China has been questioned by academics. Professor Sulfikar Amir of Nanyang Technological University noted that China's Belt and Road Initiative offered a larger infrastructure package that aligned with Jokowi's development ambitions, though the move also raised questions about transparency and debt sustainability.

Jokowi's youngest son, Kaesang Pangarep, also faced public scrutiny. In 2024, he was criticized for reportedly using a private jet for travel to the United States, with the charter cost estimated at Rp5 billion, raising questions about potential gratification from business figures. His acquisition of shares worth Rp92 billion in a publicly listed company in 2021 also drew attention, with observers questioning the source of funds. Earlier, several of Kaesang's business ventures had received significant funding from venture capital firms, including Alpha JWC Ventures, which reportedly invested millions of dollars.

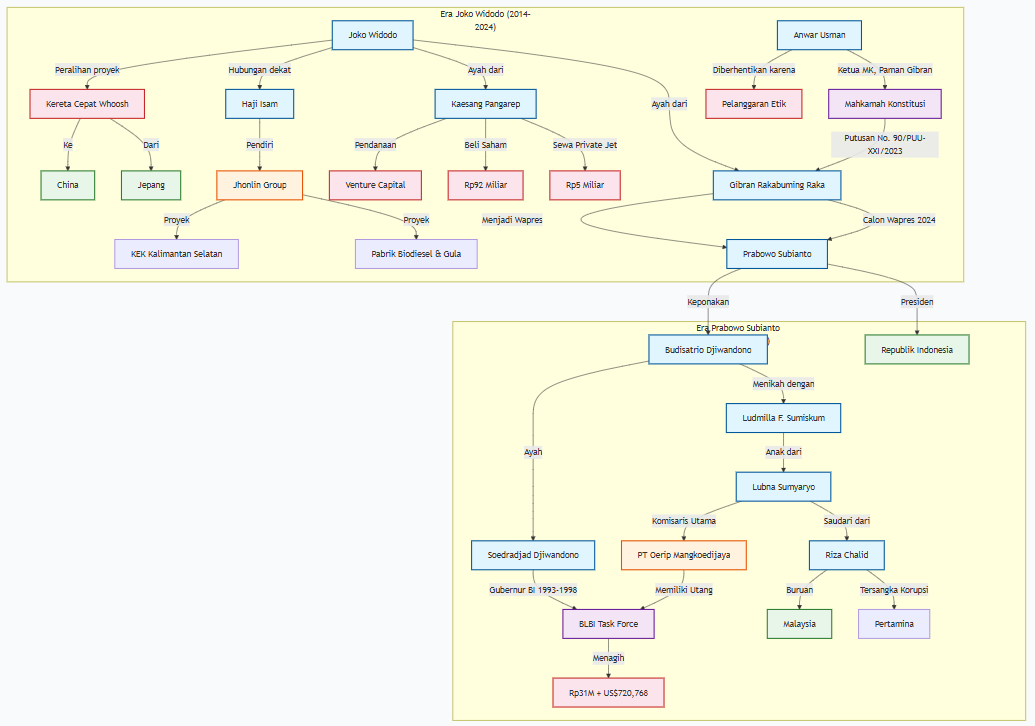
Elite networks and controversies in Indonesia (2014–2026). This flowchart illustrates the family, business, and institutional connections involved in corruption scandals and political controversies during the Jokowi and Prabowo presidencies. Blue indicates public figures, orange represents companies, purple denotes state institutions, red marks controversial events, and green signifies countries or regions.

The administration of President Prabowo Subianto, who succeeded Jokowi in 2024, also faces scrutiny over elite family networks. In 2023, the BLBI Task Force summoned the management of PT Oerip Mangkoedijaya Sumiskum to collect outstanding debts of Rp31.04 billion and US$720,768.69. The company's main commissioner was Lubna Sumyaryo binti Chalid Rachmat, who is also the sister of Pertamina corruption convict Riza Chalid, and the mother of Ludmilla F. Sumiskum—who married Budisatrio Djiwandono, the son of former Bank Indonesia Governor Soedradjad Djiwandono (1993–1998). The case highlights the continued relevance of elite family networks in Indonesian corruption cases, from the BLBI policy era to contemporary law enforcementporary law enforcement.

== Corruption charges against Suharto ==
Investigations into allegations of corruption against Indonesian former president/dictator Suharto began immediately after his 32-year rule. In the Global Transparency Report, made by Transparency International in 2004, he was ranked as the world's most corrupt leader. The report accused Suharto of causing losses of US$15–35 billion for the Indonesian government.

Suharto headed several organizations during his rule, with various functions, including providing education, health, and support for veterans of Trikora. All of these organizations were suspected of receiving illicit funds, which were embezzled from the state.

== See also ==
- Corruption Eradication Commission
- Corruption charges against Suharto
- Category:Indonesian politicians convicted of corruption
- International Anti-Corruption Academy
- Group of States Against Corruption
- International Anti-Corruption Day
- ISO 37001 Anti-bribery management systems
- United Nations Convention against Corruption
- OECD Anti-Bribery Convention
- Transparency International
- Corruption in Malaysia
