= Yoseph Ansar Rera =

Indonesian politician and civil servant

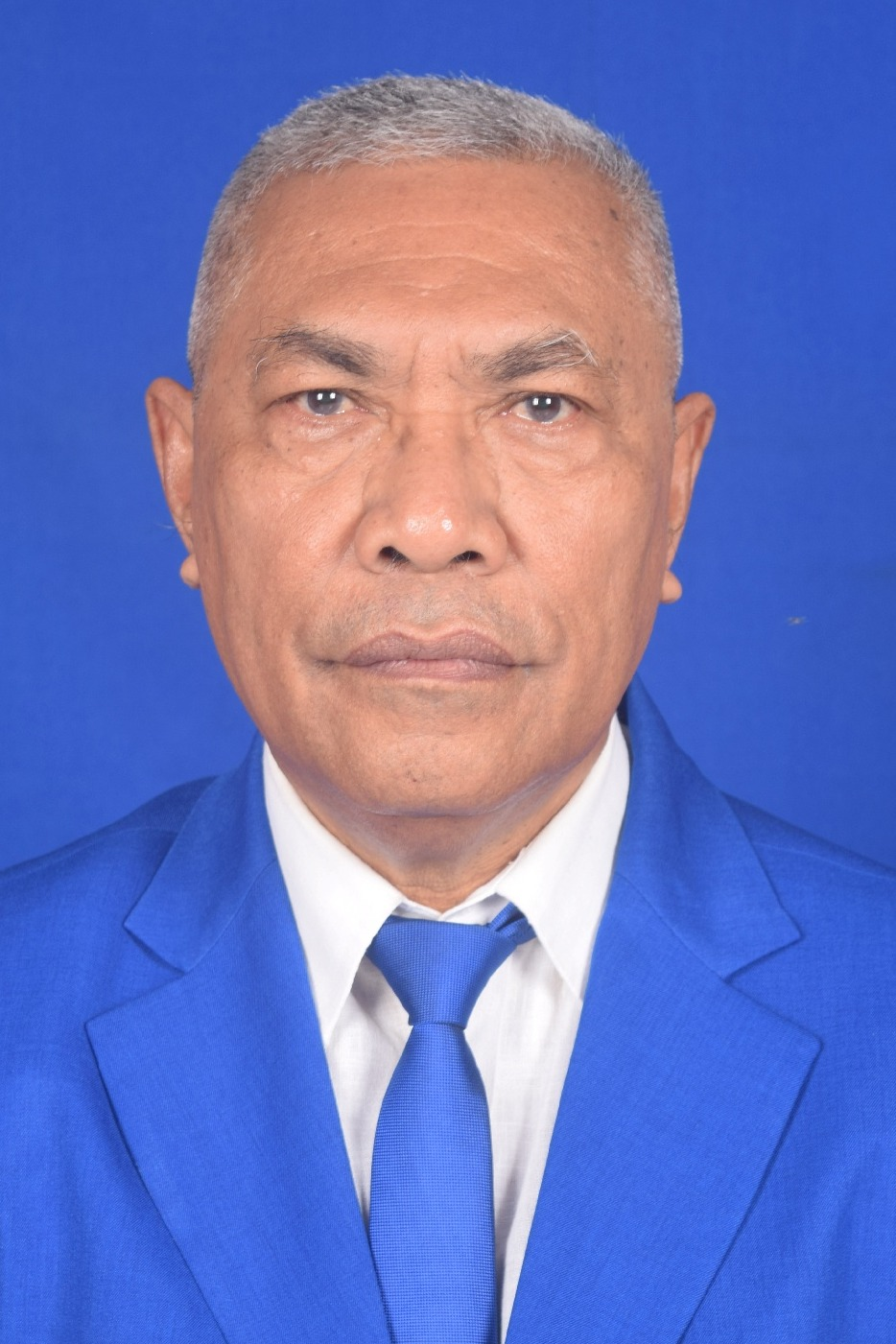
- 2023 portrait

Regent of Sikka
- In office 6 July 2013 – 6 July 2018
- Preceded by: Sosimus Mitang
- Succeeded by: Fransiskus Roberto Diogo

Personal details
- Born: 21 September 1955 (age 70) Sikka, East Nusa Tenggara, Indonesia

Yoseph Ansar Rera (born 21 September 1955) is an Indonesian politician and former civil servant who was the regent of Sikka Regency, East Nusa Tenggara from 2013 to 2018. He was also the vice regent of Sikka from 2003 to 2008.

== Early life ==
Yoseph Ansar Rera was born on 21 March 1955 in Paga district of Sikka Regency. He originates from the Lio tribe which inhabits the western parts of Sikka. He obtained a doctorate in public administration in 1988 from the Institute of Home Affairs Governance.

== Career ==
Rera worked as a civil servant, becoming head of the municipal government's sociopolitical affairs office by 1998. He was then appointed as secretary to the municipal legislature. In 2003, Rera was elected to become vice regent of Alexander Longginus for the 2003–2008 term. He was also an administrator at Sikka's Nusa Nipa University. In 2008, he opted to run as a regent candidate in Sikka's first direct regency election, however, his candidacy was disqualified by the municipal elections commission.

He made another run in 2013, with the backing of the Gerindra Party with Paulus Nong Susar as running mate. After placing second in the first round out of nine candidates, he defeated Fransiskus Roberto Diogo in the runoff after winning 52.5 percent of votes, with most candidates eliminated in the second round endorsing Rera. Rera and Susar were sworn in on 6 July 2013.

During his time as regent, Rera heavily promoted tourism, especially marine tourism in the Maumere Bay. He also launched an anti-slum program, and conducted several slum clearances throughout his term. In February 2017, due to heavy rains impacting Sikka, Rera declared a state of disaster emergency. Rera unsuccessfully ran for reelection in 2018, securing 44,476 votes (28.3%) and placing third behind Diogo and Longginus.

=== Post-regency ===
In the 2024 Indonesian legislative election, he ran as a National Mandate Party candidate for the provincial legislature. He won 5,027 votes, but failed to secure a seat. He joined the Indonesian Solidarity Party in October 2025.
