= 2024 Sikka regency election =

Local election in Indonesia

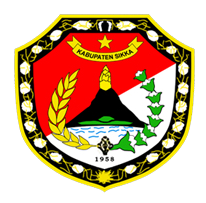
- 27 November 2024
- Turnout: 87.3%
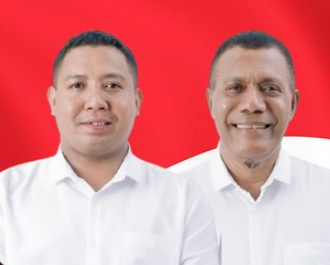

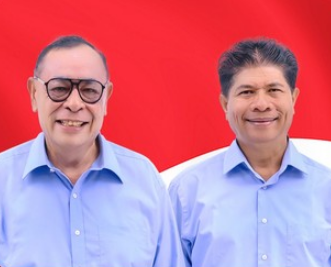

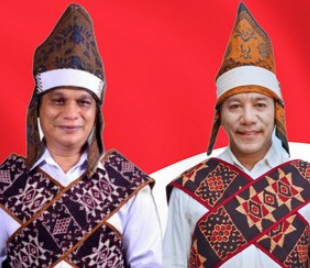
Candidate	Juventus Prima Yoris Kago	Suitbertus Amandus	Fransiskus Roberto Diogo
Party	PSI	PKB	PDI-P
Running mate	Simon Subandi Supriadi	Robertus Ray	Martinus Wodon
Popular vote	67,504	59,485	35,454
Percentage	39.76%	35.04%	20.88%
Regent before election
Adrianus F. Parera (act.)
Independent
Elected Regent
Juventus Prima Yoris Kago
PSI

The 2024 Sikka regency election was held on 27 November 2024 as part of nationwide local elections to elect the regent of Sikka Regency, East Nusa Tenggara for a five-year term. The previous election was held in 2018. Indonesian Solidarity Party candidate Juventus Prima Yoris Kago won the election, defeating previous regent Fransiskus Roberto Diogo and two other candidates.

== Electoral system ==
The election, like other local elections in 2024, follow the first-past-the-post system where the candidate with the most votes wins the election, even if they do not win a majority. It is possible for a candidate to run uncontested, in which case the candidate is still required to win a majority of votes "against" an "empty box" option. Should the candidate fail to do so, the election will be repeated on a later date.

== Candidates ==
According to electoral regulations, candidates were required to secure the support of a political party or a coalition of parties which collectively won at least 10 percent of votes in the 2024 legislative election for the municipal legislature, i.e. at least 18,075 votes total. Candidates may alternatively register without party endorsement by submitting photocopies of identity cards. One candidate, Mekeng P. Florianus, passed the requirements and took part in the election as an independent candidate. Florianus was a municipal bureaucrat who briefly served as acting regent of Sikka in 2018, and his running mate Alfridus Melanus Aeng served as a municipal legislator from 2004 to 2024.

Sikka's 2018–2023 regent, Fransiskus Roberto Diogo of the Indonesian Democratic Party of Struggle, ran for his second term, marking his fourth participation in Sikka's regency elections. As his running mate was Martinus Wodon, a member of Sikka's municipal legislature from the Democratic Party. Aside from their own parties, Diogo and Wodon was further endorsed by the Perindo Party. Suitbertus Amandus, a coffee entrepreneur based in Sikka and a member of the municipal legislature from 2004 to 2009, also contested the election. His running mate, Robertus Ray, is a bureaucrat in Sikka's local government. The Amandus-Ray ticket received the endorsement of the National Awakening Party, Nasdem Party, Hanura, PPP, and Garuda. The fourth candidate, Juventus Prima Yoris Kago, is a 33-year old Indonesian Solidarity Party (PSI) member who had been active in student Catholic organizations. His running mate Simon Subandi Supriadi is a local politician who served in the municipal legislature from 2009-2014 and 2019-2024. Kago and Supriadi was endorsed by PSI, Gerindra, Golkar, PKS, and PKN.

== Campaign ==
The election campaign involved just a single round of public debate between the candidates (based on the available budget), held on 24 October 2024. Each candidate's campaign team was restricted to a maximum budget of Rp 38.92 billion (~USD 2.45 million).

=== Polling ===
Pollster	Date	Sample size	Kago	Amandus	Diogo	Florianus	No choice
LSI	21–25 October 2024	400	36.4%	24.4%	13.9%	6.1%	19.2%

== Results ==
Candidate	Running mate	Candidate party	Votes	%
Juventus Prima Yoris Kago	Simon Subandi Supriadi	PSI	67,504	39.76
Suitbertus Amandus	Robertus Ray	PKB	59,485	35.04
Fransiskus Roberto Diogo	Martinus Wodon	PDI-P	35,454	20.88
Mekeng P. Florianus	Alfridus Melanus Aeng	Independent	7,333	4.32
Total			169,776	100.00
Valid votes			169,776	98.52
Invalid/blank votes			2,552	1.48
Total votes			172,328	100.00
Registered voters/turnout			197,452	87.28
Source: Sikka KPU

=== Lawsuit ===
Following the announcement of election results, the Amandus–Ray campaign team filed a lawsuit at the Constitutional Court of Indonesia to annul the election results and disqualify the Kago–Supriadi ticket. The lawsuit was summarily rejected for being filed too late. Kago and Supriadi were sworn in as regent and vice regent on 20 February 2025.
