= Juventus Prima Yoris Kago =

Indonesian politician

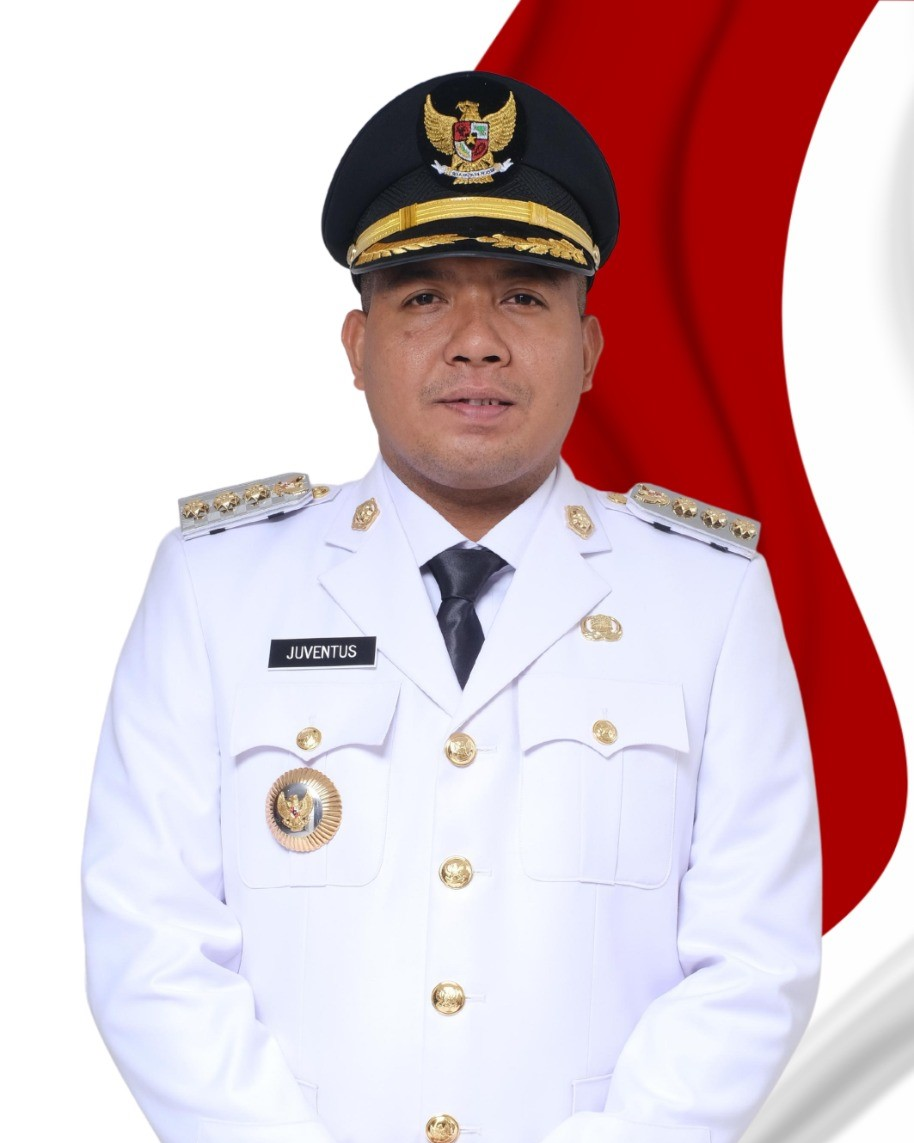

Regent of Sikka
- Incumbent
- Assumed office 20 February 2025
- Preceded by: Fransiskus Roberto Diogo; Adrianus Firminus (act.)

Personal details
- Born: 30 May 1991 (age 34) Maumere, East Nusa Tenggara, Indonesia
- Party: PSI

Juventus Prima Yoris Kago (born 30 May 1991) is an Indonesian politician of the Indonesian Solidarity Party who has served as the regent of Sikka, East Nusa Tenggara since February 2025.

== Early life ==
Kago was born at the town of Maumere in Sikka Regency on 30 May 1991. He completed middle and high school at Catholic schools in Maumere, before he moved to the provincial capital of Kupang where he studied law at the Nusa Cendana University. He would later also receive a master's degree from Trisakti University. During his studies, Kago was active at the Indonesian Catholic Students' Association (PMKRI), becoming chairman of its Kupang branch in 2014 and its national organization in 2018–2020.

== Career ==
After completing his studies, Kago worked for some time as a staffer at the Presidential Office, and also worked for some time at the Ministry of Agrarian Affairs and Spatial Planning.

In 2023, Kago and his successor at PMKRI Benidiktus Papa joined the Indonesian Solidarity Party (PSI), and ran for a seat at the House of Representatives from East Nusa Tenggara's 1st district in the following year's election. He won 14,158 votes, but failed to win a seat with PSI failing to exceed the national parliamentary threshold of 4%.

=== Sikka ===
Later in 2024, Kago ran in the regency election for Sikka, with local legislature member Simon Subandi Supriadi (Golkar) as his running mate. The pair secured 67,504 votes (39.7%), defeating three other candidates including previous regent Fransiskus Roberto Diogo. They were sworn in as regent on 20 February 2025. At the time of his swearing in, Kago was the youngest of Sikka's 10 regents to date at 33 years and 8 months.

As regent, Kago upheld a decision by the acting regent before him Adrianus Firminus Parera in 2023 to close a market near Maumere, and when the municipal government lost a lawsuit against the decision at the district court, appealed to the High Court in Mataram and later Supreme Court of Indonesia, both of which supported the Sikka government. In January 2026, Kago became involved in a public scandal when a teacher he scolded for smoking during a meeting fainted and was injured. Kago later apologized to the fainted teacher.

Within PSI, Kago was appointed chairman for bureaucratic reform in the party's leadership structure for the 2025–2030 term.

== Personal life ==
Kago is married to Fiesta Sambuari.
