= Daniel Woda Palle =

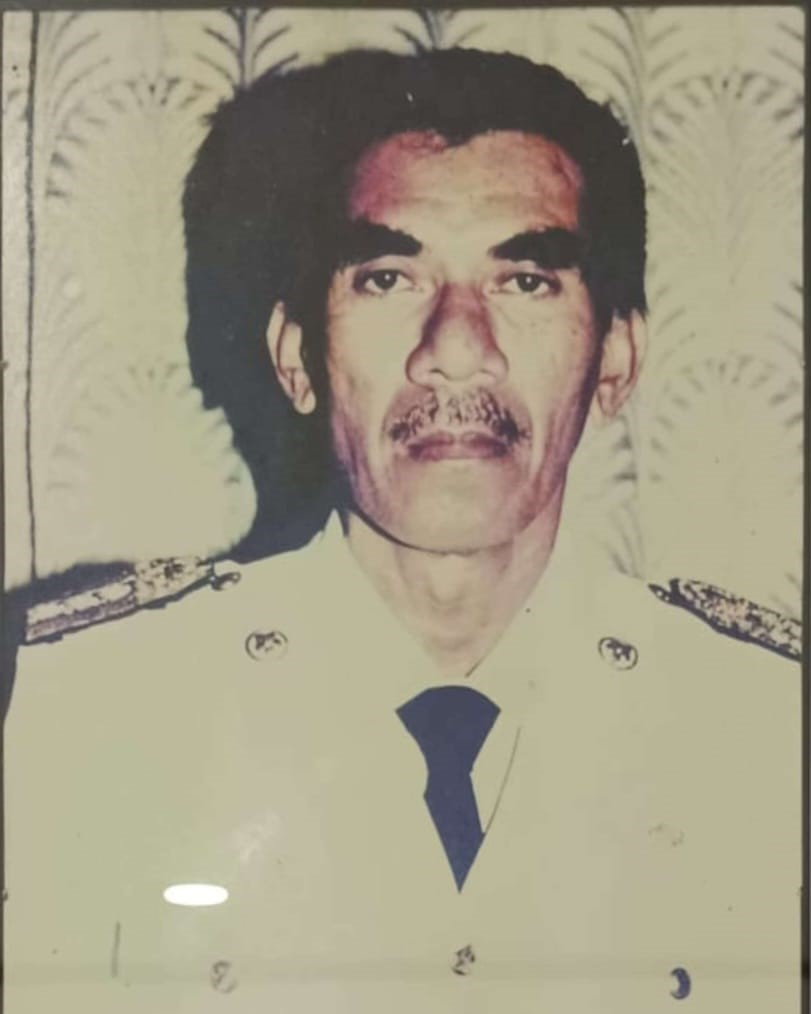

Member of the People's Consultative Assembly
- In office 1997–1999

Speaker of East Nusa Tenggara DPRD
- In office 1999–2004

Regent of Sikka
- In office 10 May 1978 – 1988
- Preceded by: Laurentius Say
- Succeeded by: Avelinus Maschur Conterius

Personal details
- Born: 9 July 1939 (age 86) Sikka, Dutch East Indies

Daniel Woda Palle (born 9 July 1939) is an Indonesian former politician. He was a member of the People's Consultative Assembly from 1997 to 1999, along with being a member of East Nusa Tenggara's Regional House of Representatives and its speaker from 1999 to 2004. He also served as the regent of Sikka Regency in Flores from 1978 to 1988.

== Early life ==
Daniel Woda Palle was born on 9 July 1939 in present-day Paga district of Sikka Regency on Flores island. After completing elementary school in 1951 in Sikka, he moved to the larger town of Ende for middle school and then to Central Java where he studied at a Catholic high school. He graduated high school in 1957.

== Career ==
After receiving his diploma, he returned to Flores where he found a job in the local government. After a brief study in Makassar, he joined the municipal government of Sikka in 1959, and by 1962 he had been appointed the district head of Maumere, the chief town of Sikka. Between 1964 and 1977, he alternated between studying at the Home Affairs Governance Institute in Malang, East Java and being the regional secretary (highest-ranking civil servant) of Sikka under regent Laurentius Say.

On 17 March 1978, Palle ran as regent of Sikka to succeed Say, and was elected in the local legislature after securing 12 out of the 18 votes cast, and he was sworn in as regent on 10 May 1978. Palle would be reelected in 1983 for a second term after winning 12 out of 21 votes. During his tenure as regent, Palle promoted the cultivation of cash crops such as cloves, nutmeg and coffee (with help from Catholic missionary Heinrich Bollen), along with introducing new fishing methods for Sikka's fishermen.

After his tenure in Sikka, he briefly served as acting regent of Manggarai in 1989 before being assigned to various positions in the provincial government of East Nusa Tenggara. In 1997, he was appointed as one of five appointed envoys from NTT to the People's Consultative Assembly (MPR). While a MPR member, Palle concurrently was deputy speaker of NTT's Regional House of Representatives (DPRD NTT). He was then elected DPRD NTT's speaker for the 1999–2004 term, but after the expiry of his tenure he retired from political life.

== Family ==
Palle is married to Maria Wilhelmina Kaunang and the couple has five children. Their third children, Robertus Donatus Ndona Palle, was a major general in the Indonesian Army who died in 2025.
