= Avelinus Maschur Conterius =

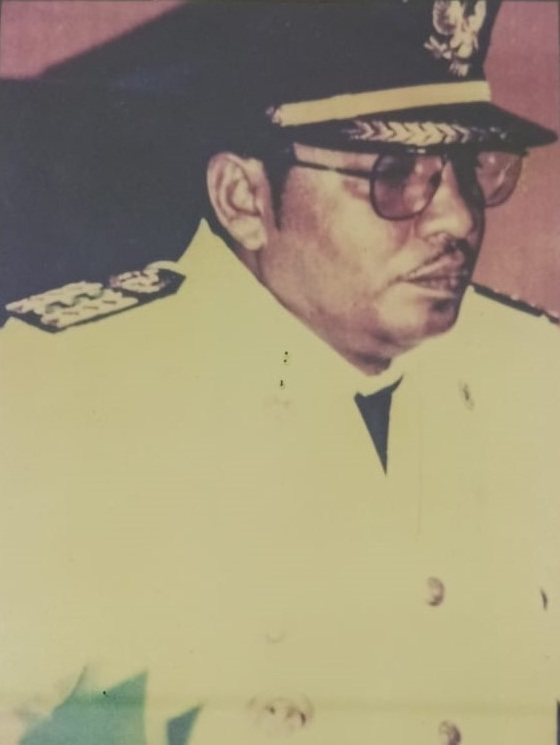

Regent of Sikka
- In office 21 May 1988 – 21 May 1993
- Preceded by: Daniel Woda Palle
- Succeeded by: Alexander Idong

Personal details
- Born: 18 May 1942
- Died: 4 October 1994 (aged 52)

Avelinus Maschur Conterius (18 May 1942 – 4 October 1994) was an Indonesian politician and civil servant. He served as the regent of Sikka Regency in East Nusa Tenggara between 21 May 1988 and 21 May 1993.

The 1992 Flores earthquake and tsunami occurred during Conterius' term as regent, with heavy damage to infrastructure in Sikka including to the regent's office. After the end of his tenure as regent in 1993, five names including his own were submitted to the Ministry of Home Affairs to be considered for election by the local legislature. The ministry returned three names which did not include Conterius, and hence he did not take part in the election for a second term. He was succeeded by Alexander Idong.
