= Panusunan Pasaribu =

Indonesian civil servant and politician (1946–2020)

15th Regent of Central Tapanuli
- In office 5 September 1995 – 5 April 2001
- Governor: Raja Inal Siregar; Tengku Rizal Nurdin
- Preceded by: Amrun Daulay
- Succeeded by: Tuani Lumbantobing

Personal details
- Born: 22 June 1946 Padangsidempuan, Tapanuli, Dutch East Indies, now Indonesia
- Died: 30 December 2020 (aged 74) Padangsidempuan, North Sumatra, Indonesia
- Spouse: Isna Hirawati
- Children: Dolly Pasaribu

Panusunan Pasaribu (22 June 1946 – 30 December 2020) was an Indonesian civil servant and politician who served as Regent of Central Tapanuli from 1995 to 2001.

Pasaribu completed his undergraduate education at Sanata Dharma University, Yogyakarta in 1972. After that he worked as a civil servant of the North Sumatra Provincial Government since 1974 until 1992. He then became Regional Secretary of Simalungun

In 1995, he was elected as Regent of Central Tapanuli, which was then elected by the Central Tapanuli DPRD to replace Amrun Daulay. He served until 2001 and after that was replaced by Tuani Lumbantobing. After becoming regent, Pasaribu continued his bureaucratic career in various positions in the Provincial Government again until his retirement in 2006.

== Personal life and family ==
Pasaribu was married to Isna Hirawati and has two sons and one daughter. One of his sons, Dolly Pasaribu elected as Regent of South Tapanuli for the period 2021–2026.

His older brother Bomer Pasaribu was Minister of Manpower in 1999–2000. His younger brother was also involved in politics, namely Syahrul M. Pasaribu who was the Regent of South Tapanuli (2010–2021), and Gus Irawan Pasaribu who was a member of the Indonesian Parliament since 2014.

== Death ==
Pasaribu died on December 30, 2020, at the age of 74. He was buried the next day on 31 December in the village of Tanjung Dolok, Marancar, South Tapanuli.
