= Kria Fahmi Pasaribu =

Indonesian diplomat (1951-2017)

Ambassador of Indonesia to Laos
- In office 20 January 2010 – March 2013
- President: Susilo Bambang Yudhoyono
- Preceded by: Sutjiptohardjo Donokusumo
- Succeeded by: Irmawan Emir Wisnandar

Personal details
- Born: 18 May 1951 Sorkam, North Sumatra, Indonesia
- Died: 4 April 2017 (aged 65) Siloam Hospital, Kebon Jeruk, West Jakarta, Indonesia
- Education: Padjadjaran University (S.H.)

Kria Fahmi Pasaribu (18 May 1951 – 4 April 2017) was an Indonesian diplomat who served in various high-ranking capacities within the foreign ministry. His diplomatic career culminated in his appointment as the ambassador to Laos. Prior to assuming his ambassadorship, Kria served as consul general in Houston.

== Early life and education ==
Kria was born in Sorkam on 18 May 1951. He studied law at the Padjadjaran University in Bandung.

== Diplomatic career ==
Kria joined the diplomatic service in 1980 as a junior staff member in the directorate of legal affairs and treaties. He was subsequently appointed as the section chief responsible for maritime laws and ocean affairs. By 1984, he was posted to the permanent mission to the United Nations in New York with the rank of attaché. During this period, he participated in a United Nations seminar regarding Palestine. He was promoted to the rank of third secretary during his duty there and returned to Indonesia in 1988 to serve as the section chief responsible for environmental law in the directorate of legal affairs and treaties.

In 1992, Kria was assigned to Indonesia's permanent delegation to the UNESCO in Paris, France. He began his tenure with the diplomatic rank of second secretary. By the next year, he was promoted to the rank of first secretary and was designated as the deputy permanent representative of Indonesia to UNESCO. He was then further promoted to the rank counsellor during his duty in Paris, before being transferred to the embassy in The Hague, Netherlands. In The Hague, Kria headed the embassy's political section with the rank of counsellor, and later, minister counsellor. During his time in The Hague, he also functioned as the alternate/deputy permanent representative to the Organization for the Prohibition of Chemical Weapons. During his assignment in The Hague, in 2002 Kria was involved in negotiations regarding the Ligitan and Sipadan territorial dispute at the International Court of Justice.

Kria briefly became the deputy director for territorial affairs within the foreign ministry before being appointed as the director of economic, social, and cultural treaties on 6 April 2004. On 28 December 2005, Kria was sworn in as the foreign ministry's legal affairs director. On 17 January 2007, Kria became Indonesia's consul general in Houston. He officially began his duty on 5 May 2007. During his tenure, Kria handled cases of Indonesian citizen deportation in his jurisdiction.

Kria was installed as ambassador to Laos on 20 January 2010. He conferred copies of his credentials to the deputy foreign minister Phongsavath Boupha on 30 April 2010 and presented his credentials to the president of Laos Choummaly Sayasone on 4 May 2010. Kria described Sayasone as a president who is "close and beloved by his people". During his tenure, Kria oversaw the signing of a visa exemption agreement in early 2011 and signed a treaty regarding double taxation avoidance and fiscal evasion prevention on 8 September 2011.

== Personal life ==
Kria was married to Hastuty Firmasari, and the couple had three children. His daughter, Silvany Pasaribu, followed his footsteps as a diplomat.

Kria had been diagnosed with bladder cancer in 2001, which necessitated the removal of his bladder. In 2011, he was diagnosed with prostate cancer, for which he underwent external beam radiation. Subsequently, in 2013, he was diagnosed with kidney cancer, resulting in the removal of his left kidney. His remaining right kidney lost more than 80% of its function, requiring him to undergo dialysis treatments twice a week from 2013 onwards.

About a month prior to his death, on 15 March 2017 Kria was admitted to the emergency room due to severe abdominal pain following weeks of flu-like symptoms. Medical examinations revealed a bacterial infection and swelling in his kidney, which was diagnosed as septic shock. He underwent emergency surgery to drain pus from the kidney tissue. Despite initial medical interventions and a brief period where his condition stabilized and he was removed from a ventilator, his health deteriorated due to severe internal bleeding in the throat and stomach, leading to a second septic shock and multiple organ failure. Doctors also discovered a mass in his kidney suspected to be cancerous, which was believed to be the underlying cause of the sepsis. Kria eventually died on 4 April 2017 at the Siloam Hospital in Kebon Jeruk, West Jakarta.
