= Djufrie Asmoredjo =

Indonesian politician

Djufrie Asmoredjo is an Indonesian politician. He was a leading figure of Jakarta's PPP Chapter in the 1990s, and was chairman for a period. He was a candidate in the 1992 Indonesian legislative election.
