= Sosimus Mitang =

Indonesian politician and civil servant

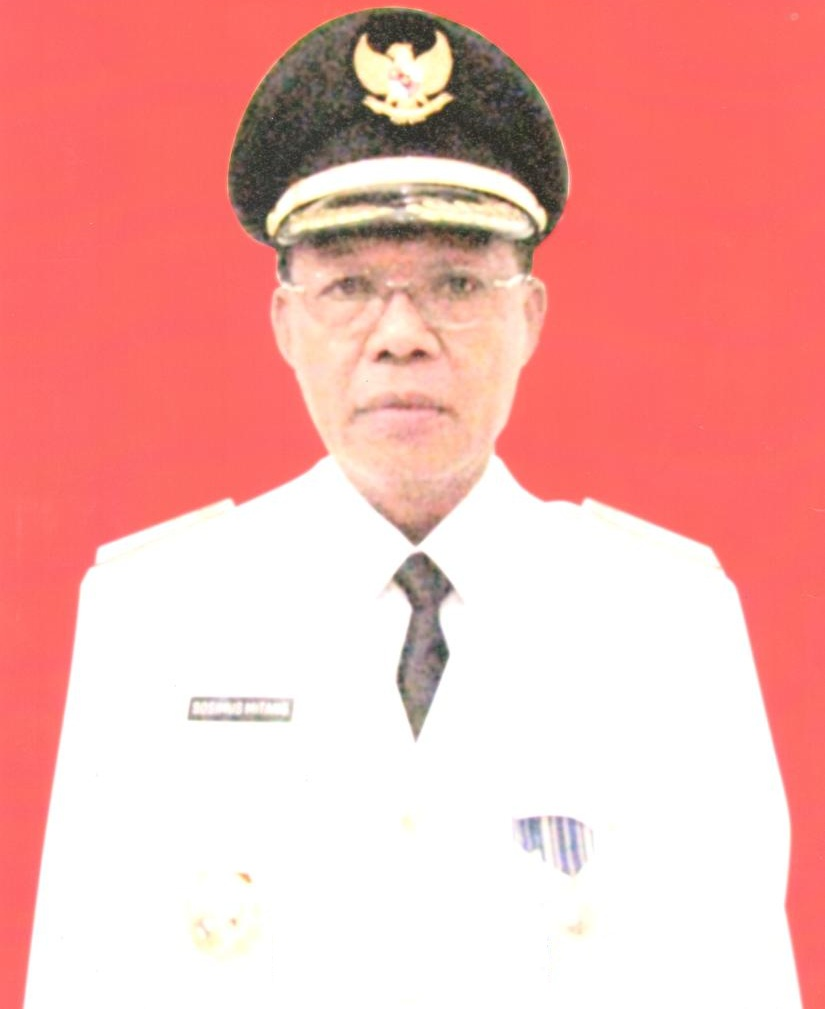

Regent of Sikka
- In office 31 May 2008 – 31 May 2013
- Preceded by: Alexander Longginus
- Succeeded by: Yoseph Ansar Rera

Personal details
- Born: 22 November 1950
- Died: 31 March 2019 (aged 68) Maumere, East Nusa Tenggara, Indonesia

Sosimus Mitang (22 November 1950 – 31 March 2019) was an Indonesian politician and civil servant who was the regent of Sikka Regency, East Nusa Tenggara from 2008 to 2013.

== Early life and career ==
Sosimus Mitang was born on 22 November 1950. He worked as a civil servant, and by the 1980s he was head of the East Nusa Tenggara's representative office in Jakarta. In this office, he promoted cultural activities from the province in Jakarta, and founded a dance studio focused on dances from the province. He was then regional secretary of Sikka Regency during the tenure of regent Alexander Longginus in 2003–2008.

== Regent ==
In 2008, Mitang ran in Sikka's first direct regency election, with Damianus Wera as his running mate. The pair received the support of a coalition of four parties (Demokrat, Patriot, Sarikat, and PNIM), and defeated the incumbent Longginus in the five-way race after winning 49,839 votes (33.8%). His voter base was largely concentrated in the eastern half of Sikka, where he won in six districts out of eleven he won regency-wide.

As part of the municipal government's poverty alleviation program, Mitang encouraged work programs and conditioned benefit transfers. Notably, he made bylaws which excluded residents who gambled, abandoned farmland, or engaged in celebrations more than twice a year from receiving poverty benefits. He also opted to distribute government-subsidised rice in exchange for labor instead of simply selling it at the lower price. The municipal government also constructed roads to previously isolated villages in the regency.

He ran for reelection in 2013 with Silvanus Tibo as his running mate, but the pair failed to win enough votes to qualify for a runoff in the nine-way race. The election was ultimately won by Yoseph Ansar Rera. In the 2014 legislative election, he unsuccessfully ran for a seat in East Nusa Tenggara's provincial legislature as a National Mandate Party candidate.

== Personal life and death ==
Mitang is married to Firmina Sedo Mitang. Firmina expressed her interest in taking part in Sikka's 2018 election, and registered at political parties, but ultimately did not take part. Mitang has at least four younger brothers.

He died just after midnight on 31 March 2019 at Maumere's Regional General Hospital, and was buried at his home in Maumere.
