= 3rd Congress of the Indonesian Democratic Party =

Indonesian political congress

- 15 April 1986 – 18 April 1986
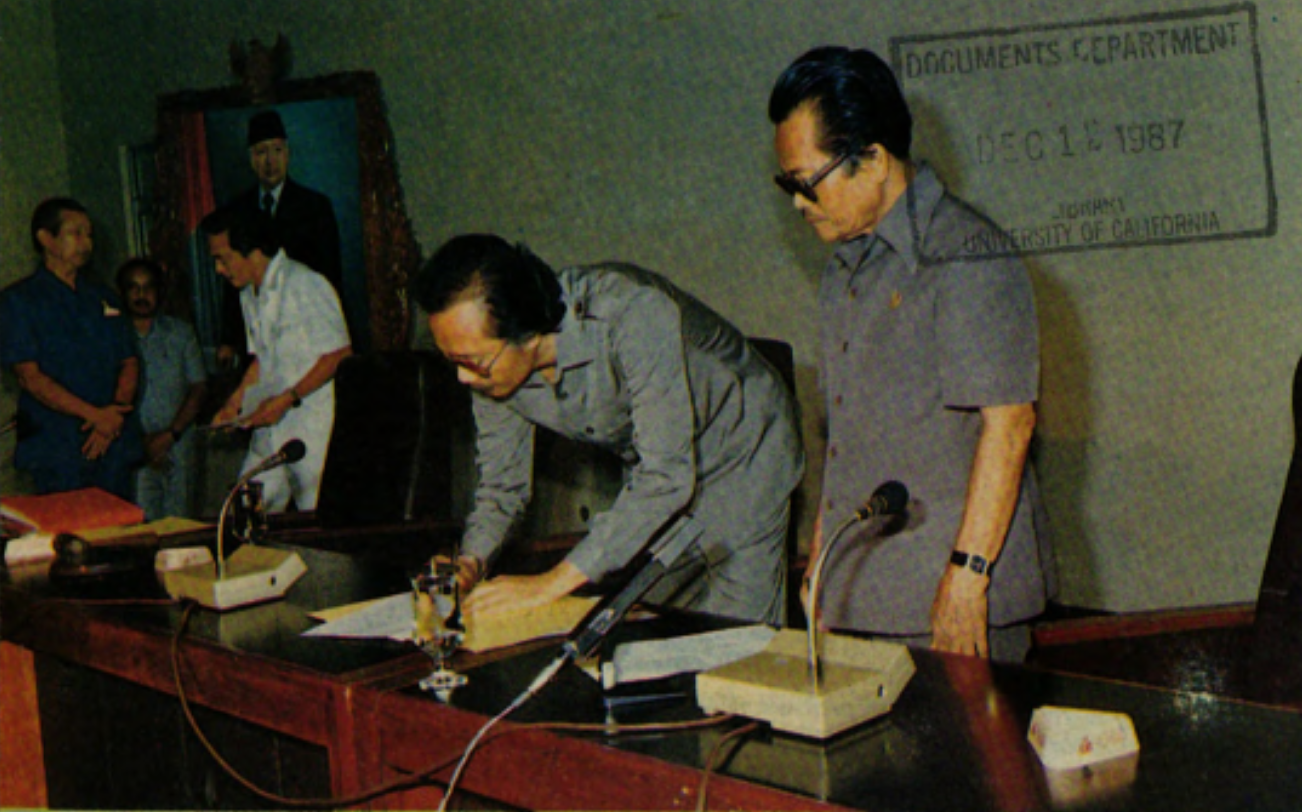
- Newly elected chairman Suryadi (second from right) signing the handover of the party's leadership
- Cities: Jakarta, Indonesia
- Venues: Graha Sasono Langen Budoyo
- Chair: F. S. Wignjosoemarsono

The Third Congress of the Indonesian Democratic Party (Indonesian: Kongres III Partai Demokrasi Indonesia (PDI)) was held between 15 – 18 April 1986. Planned to end on 17 April 1986, it was extended due to riots which led to the congress's failure to decide on the Indonesian Democratic Party's new Central Executive Council (Indonesian: Dewan Pimpinan Pusat) (CEC) for the 1986-1993 period.

The congress was opened on 15 April 1986 at the Sasono Langen Budoyo building, Taman Mini Indonesia Indah, Jakarta. The congress was attended by the president and vice president of Indonesia, Soeharto and Umar Wirahadikusumah, the ministers of the Fourth Development Cabinet, chairpersons of state organizations, ambassadors, the general chairmen of Golkar and the United Development Party, and around 1,250 participants of the congress.

== Background ==
The initiative to organize a PDI congress was raised by the Minister of Home Affairs, Soepardjo Rustam, in a speech during the PDI's 12th anniversary on January 11, 1985 at the Women's Building. He argued that the 1973 fusion of political parties and the application of the single principle of Pancasila in 1983 resulted in conflict within political parties, thus indicating extreme differences in the political orientation of the political parties. Although factions within the PDI were formally abolished by the approval of the party's DPP the day before, the then PDI chairman Sunawar Sukowati wanted a national meeting to eliminate factions within the PDI down to the grassroots.

A stronger urge to hold a congress was delivered by Hardijanto Sumodisastro as the chairman of the Central Executive Council of PDI. The congress was required to refresh the CEC of the party. The idea of holding a congress was supported by the majority of the party's CEC, who wanted to resolve all of the party's conflict through the congress, and stating that anyone who refused to hold the congress violated the party's constitution. Still, several branches of the party, most notably the Jakarta branch, refused to hold a congress, on the grounds of membership problems in the party.

The conflict for the need of a national meeting ended in November and December 1985. The discussion was whether to hold a congress or a national conference. Since the end of October, the East Java Branch of PDI had urged the CEC to hold a congress. The head of the Lampung Branch of PDI urged that the national conference should be held first, and the congress to be held after the 1987 elections.

A meeting about this matter was held on 1 November 1985. The meeting was attended by 14 of the 15 ranks of PDI, only not to be attended by Wignyo Sumarsono, one of the heads of PDI. In the meeting, nine ranks of the party, including Wignyo, agreed to hold a congress, while six agreed to hold a national conference. Even though the ranks who agreed to hold a congress gained a majority, the meeting did not result in any decision.

This argument eventually split the ranks of PDI into two different groups. They were the group that supports congress, consisting of nine ranks, including the sick Muhidin Nasution, and the group that supports national conference, consisting of six ranks. The congress group declared their intent to hold a congress on 12 November, signed by eight ranks, excluding Muhidin. The group criticized the head and the general secretary of the party which supported the national conference, for not adhering to the party's constitution. The congress group held a meeting on 30 November 1985 and formed a committee to hold a congress. Meanwhile, the national conference group held a meeting on 4 December 1985. Ironically, the meeting ended with the group agreeing to hold congress, thus ending dissent in the party.

Even though the CEC of the party agreed to hold a congress, twenty branches of the party still insisted on the national conference. To face this, on 6 December 1985, the CEC consulted with the Minister of Home Affairs, Soepardjo Rustam, about the congress. The consultation discussed the organization of the congress. Further preparations of the congress were discussed with President Soeharto on 14 March 1986, and Vice President Umar Wirahadikusumah on 22 March 1986.

== Preparation ==
=== Problems ===
One of the main problems which would be discussed in the congress was the regeneration of the CEC. The young generation of the political party argued that the process of regeneration has to be held with the basis that the maximum age for the chairman position is 55 years old. The young generation also argued that there should be a classification for the CEC in three groups based on age: 30–45 years old, 45–50 years old, 50–55 years old. This argument was opposed by Mohammad Isnaeni, the first chairman of PDI, stating such grouping can cause syndicalist anarchy inside the party, and may ruin PDI's plan for the 1987 elections. Meanwhile, several figures of PDI, such as Aberson, Suryadi, and several branches of PDI, agreed to the regeneration process.

Other problems that continually plague PDI since its first congress are about the incomplete fusion of the party. The PNI faction inside the party dominated the matters of PDI. The PNI faction rejected the argument, claiming that the problem is due to the PNI faction being the largest faction inside the party and other parties, such as IPKI and Murba have a smaller base of support.

Prior to the congress, there were four empty offices. Three of the offices: Soenawar Soekowati (chairman), Muhidin Nasution (head), and Indra Bakti (head), were caused due to the death of the holders, and Mohammad Isnaeni (head) was caused due to his appointment as the Ambassador of Indonesia to Romania. The empty offices were decided to be left empty until the formation of a new CEC in the congress.

=== Nominations ===
Prior to the congress, several names were nominated as the chairman of PDI. The names were sorted to largest popularity, based on a survey conducted a day before the congress.

- I Gusti Ngurah Gde Jaksa
- Suryadi
- Yusuf Merukh
- Hardjantho Sumodisastro
- Mohammad Isnaeni
- Achmad Subagyo
- Sutoyo
- Probosutedjo

== Congress ==
=== Opening ===
The congress members were from Jambi, Riau, North Celebes, East Java, Central Java, West Sumatra and Lampung. They expressed their disappointment by confronting Sabam Sirait, the General Secretary of PDI, and Achmad Sukarmadidjaja, when both entered the congress building, Sasano Langgen Budaya. Other congress member from Jambi, Muhammad Thayib, persuaded the members outside the building to return "rather than being humiliated".

The opening ceremony began with the Indonesian national anthem, a moment of silence, and the PDI March. After the songs, President Soeharto delivered his speech to the congress and hit the gong three times, as a symbol that the congress had been opened. After that, Wignyo Sumarsono gave the PDI placard to Soeharto and delivered a speech to the congress.

The speech given by Soepardjo Rustam to the congress was titled "The Development of PDI in the Future and Our National Political Development". In his speech, Soepardjo stated that "internal conflict in the political party may cause the obstruction in the development of PDI as an independent party." The speech was followed by the speech of Benny Moerdani as the Commander of the Indonesian National Armed Forces, titled "Framework for the Platform of National Development". Benny delivered his seven appeals and hopes to the congress, ranging from the enactment of the congress, to the role of PDI, to success the 1987 elections.

=== Candidates ===
During the congress, there were two names that had the strongest chance to gain the chairman office, Suryadi and I Gusti Ngurah Gde Jaksa. They became the strongest candidates due to their "purity" from the past and recent conflicts inside the PDI. Both were considered to be acceptable by the government and PDI. Other minor names that were still considered having a chance were Mohammad Isnaeni and Hardjantho Sumodisastro.

=== Closing failure ===
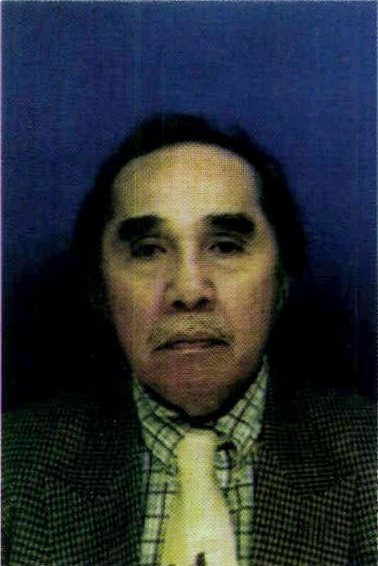
Sabam Sirait, one of the "disappearing" ranks in the congress.

Prior to the congress, the event organizers had planned to close the congress on 17 April 1986 at 19.30 am, in the Sasono Langen Budoyo building. The plan was delayed due to the stalemate in the meeting of PDI to form a new CEC for the next term. The stalemate became worse with the "disappearance" of Yusuf Merukh as the head of the congress, Sabam Sirait as the general secretary, and Sumario as the chairman of the Central Java Branch of PDI at 16.00. The disappearance of the three was responded to by the participants with insults and screams. The CEC explained to the participants that the disappearance was due to the consultations with Soepardjo, but several participants still did not believe the explanation. Eventually, on 18.00, Eddy Sukirman, as the chairman of the Party Consultative Assembly, declared that the closing was canceled. The cancellation was told to the Vice President of Indonesia earlier at 17.45.

Although the news was declared, the majority of the guests did not know about the cancellation. Many guests still arrived at 19.00, such as Soepardjo Rustam, Sudharmono as the Chairman of Golkar, Moerdiono as the Minister of State Secretariat, and several delegations of foreign countries. The PR of the Vice President of Indonesia had issued the speech text of the Vice President since 16.00. The text was received by the media and re-issued to their publishers.

Finally, at 20.00, the guests began to return, except Soepardjo, who was still there to hold a meeting with the CEC of PDI since 20.15. Yusuf, Sabam, and Sumario still did not attend the meeting. At the meeting, Soepardjo scolded one of the CEC, MB Samosir. MB Samosir apologized and asked the meeting to be continued. Soepardjo then asked Sabam and Merukh to meet him. Eventually, Sabam and Merukh met Soepardjo in private at 22.20. The meeting ended at 00.15 with Soepardjo asking that the congress must be closed tomorrow at 17.30, with him representing the vice president to officially close it.

=== Closing ===
Even though PDI had discussed the candidates for the new CEC formation, PDI failed to form a new CEC. Prior to the closing, the CEC of PDI held another meeting from 13.00 until 15.00. The congress was eventually closed on the date decided by Soepardjo. On the closing of the congress, the party decided to hand over the formation of the CEC to the Ministry of Home Affairs. The hand over was the first time in the history of Indonesia that the formation of a party CEC was handed to the government. The formation by the Ministry of Home Affairs marked a de jure intervention of PDI by the government.

=== Reaction ===
The disorganized closing of the congress caused outrage in PDI. Steve Nafuni, the chairman of the Irian Jaya branch of PDI, stated that the congress was a setback from the previous congress. A harsher criticism was delivered by the PDI delegate from Blora, who stated that "the chaos of the closing can be considered as a crime done by the old CEC of PDI for wasting 150 million spent by the regional government." Ipik Asmasubrata, the chairman of the Jakarta branch of PDI, cursed the congress by saying "The mess occurred due to the incompetent (Note: Original text in Indonesian quotes his statement as brengsek. Brengsek literally means bastard or scumbag.) CEC of the party. I am embarrassed." Ipik and other delegations from East Java, Bali, and Lampung, blame Sabam and Merukh for the failure of the congress.

A softer reaction came from outside PDI. Sudharmono and Soepardjo Rustam stated that "the congress was the best effort by PDI, and all cadres of PDI should bear the results". Nurhasan Ibnu Hajar from the United Development Party, stated that the congress was a sign that the fusion inside PDI was imperfect and the party required another generation to complete the fusion. Other figures, such as Amirmachmud, the chairman of the People's Representative Council, claimed that the failure of the congress was due to "a third party intervention by extremists who want to weaken PDI".

== Formation of CEC ==
The ministry promised that the formation of CEC would involve consultation with the members of PDI, and discussion with the CEC of PDI. Soepardjo planned that the ministry would execute the consultation in two waves, as "vertical" and "horizontal" consultation. The first wave, the "vertical" consultation would run from 19 April until 23 April, with the branches of the party from different provinces consulting with the ministry. The next wave, the "horizontal" consultation, would run from 23 until 29 April, with the outgoing CEC of the party meeting the ministry. The plan was to announce the formation prior to the fasting month, which would start on 9 May.

After the consultation, the ministry began to work on the formation 29 April. The formation was requested by PDI figures to be held by young cadres of the party. Another consideration was to eliminate Sabam and Yusuf from the formation, who some considered to be disrespectful of the party by "disappearing during the crucial minutes".

=== Announcement ===
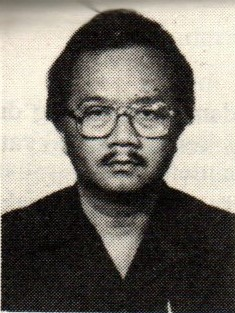
Suryadi, the elected chairman of the congress.

On 2 May 1986, the formation was officially announced with a short ceremony from Wisma Karya Senayan in Jakarta, attended by Soepardjo Rustam, the old CEC of PDI, and the chairman of branches of PDI. The papers filled with the names of the chosen was handed over by Soepardjo to Wignyo Soemarsono and he read the names of the chosen to present themselves.

Those who were chosen did not expect themselves to be chosen. For example, Benuhardjo, the chosen vice treasurer, was called by the ministry staff to attend the meeting in Jakarta, while he himself was in Jogjakarta. Fortunately, he managed to buy a Garuda airplane ticket to Jakarta. Others shared a similar story, but only Suryadi, the chosen chairman, had anticipated this.

Composition of the Central Executive Council of PDI (1986-1991)
Position	Name	Element (Note: After the congress, the term "faction" was obsolete, replaced by "element".)
Chairman	Suryadi	PNI
Head	Benedictus Nahot Marbun	Catholic Party
	Sukowaluyo Mintohardjo	IPKI
	Nur Achari	Murba
	Yahya Nasution	IPKI
	Dudy Singadilaga	PNI
Vice Head	Anjar Siswoyo	PNI
	Marcel Beding	Catholic Party
	Parulian Silalahi	Parkindo
	Fatimah Achmad	PNI
	Djufri	IPKI
	Royani Haminullah	IPKI
General Secretary	Nico Daryanto	Catholic Party
Vice General Secretary	Titi Juliasih	PNI
	Dimmy Haryanto	Catholic Party
	Anwar Dato	PNI
Treasurer	Lencang	Parkindo
Vice Treasurer	St. Benuhardjo	Parkindo
	Steve Nafuni	Catholic Party
	Markus Wauran	Catholic Party
