= Reinier Asmoredjo =

Surinamese artist

Reinier Soejatno Asmoredjo (born 25 October 1962, in Paramaribo) is a Surinamese artist of Javanese descent. Asmoredjo received his training at the Academy of Art and Culture Higher Education (AHKCO) in Paramaribo, and graduated in 1989 with a Bachelor of Arts. From 1995 he was a teacher in drawing on the General Secondary School (AMS) and since 2001 he has been an instructor at the Academy of Art and Culture. Since 1999 he has been a member of the Association of Visual Artists in Suriname (FVAS), and since 2001 has been a member of the Association of Fine Art in Suriname (ABKS). In 2013 he showcased his work at the National Art Fair in Paramaribo.

== Style ==
Asmoredjo works with oil or acrylic on canvas; he also occasionally produces ceramics. An important theme in his work is depictions of marginalized women, often with bare breasts and engaged in traditional dances. He tends to use bright, bold sunny colors and capture elements of nature in his works, and is said to paint in a "stylistic semi-figurative" way.
