= Alexander Idong =

Indonesian politician and civil servant

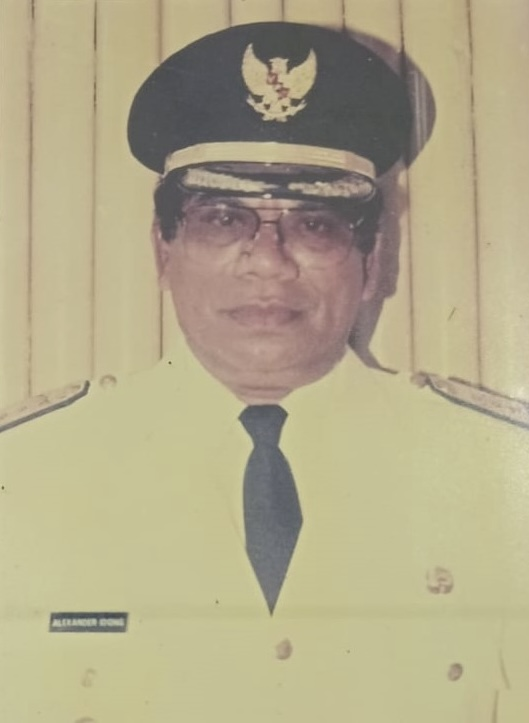

Regent of Sikka
- In office 21 May 1993 – 21 May 1998
- Preceded by: Avelinus Maschur Conterius
- Succeeded by: Paulus Moa

Personal details
- Born: 13 April 1941

Alexander Idong (13 April 1941 – ?) was an Indonesian politician and civil servant who served as the regent of Sikka, East Nusa Tenggara from May 1993 until May 1998. He was previously part of Sikka's municipal legislature and was a civil servant in its municipal government for around 30 years.

== Biography ==
Alexander Idong was born on 13 April 1941. He worked as a civil servant for almost 30 years, becoming the district head of Maumere in the 1060s and 1970s before heading Sikka's statistical agency for around 20 years. In 1992, he was elected into Sikka's Regional House of Representatives (DPRD) as a Golkar member, and became its speaker. On 25 April 1993, Idong took part in the election for the regent of Sikka, winning 13 out of 25 votes, and he was sworn in on 21 May 1993.

His tenure as regent started in the aftermath of the 1992 Flores earthquake and tsunami, which had also destroyed his own home and had forced him to live as a refugee inside a tent in Maumere for some time. He remarked that the earthquake "brought Sikka back to 1969". Much of his term as regent was spent on reconstruction of buildings and infrastructure damaged by the earthquake. The municipal government also constructed a new general hospital in Maumere (RSUD Dr. TC Hillers), and promoted local cashew products.

On 20 November 1997, with his term coming close to an end and having failed to secure political support for a second term, Idong submitted his resignation as regent in anticipation for the DPRD's election in 1998 against a backdrop of a large number of protests held in Maumere due to various grievances. The election was held on 22 April 1998, and Idong was defeated by bureaucrat Paulus Moa who obtained 13 out of 25 DPRD votes, Idong securing just seven.

He died sometime before 2019. A small sports arena in Nele district, near Maumere, was named after him in 2014 while his son Fransiskus Roberto Diogo was district chief of Nele. Diogo would later be elected regent of Sikka in 2018.
