= Bank Indonesia Liquidity Aid =

The Bank Indonesia Liquidity Aid (BLBI) was a loan scheme that was given by Bank Indonesia that underwent the liquidity problems in aftermath of 1997 Asian financial crisis in Indonesia. The scheme was done after the Indonesian government agreement with the International Monetary Fund in order to solve the economic crisis. In December 1998, BI has granted 147,7 trillion rupiah (US$17.37 billion at the time) to 48 banks.

However, the Audit Board of Indonesia later audited the grant for the 48 banks and found irregularities in the loan process. The irregularities was said to have costed the nation 138 trillion rupiah as of today(US$8.560 billion)

== Background ==
The liqudity aid was announced as an aftermath of the 1997-1998 financial crisis that rocked the entire Southeast Asia. As a result of the crisis, the Indonesian rupiah value in 1997 that were 2,380 rupiah per United States dollar, experienced a high inflation to 17.000 rupiah per US dollar on 22 January 1998, The high inflation has impacted to the high amount of national debt and mass layoffs done by Indonesian companies that were financially affected by the crisis.

To address the soaring rupiah exchange rate caused by the monetary crisis, the government has implemented several policies, including a managed floating exchange rate system and a free floating rupiah exchange rate system. These monetary policies aim to provide greater latitude for monetary control while preserving foreign exchange reserves.

However, this policy, followed by a tight monetary policy to stabilize the rupiah, actually created negative rumors in the banking sector. Rumors circulating among the public, such as foreign exchange losses, clearing losses, kidnapping of bank owners, and the flight of several bankers abroad, led to massive withdrawals of savings by customers. They transferred their funds from large private banks to state-owned or foreign banks.

As a result of massive withdrawals of money from banks and the decline in public trust in banking as well as political and economic instability, banking has become dry and no longer liquid, which will ultimately disrupt the national economy. To prevent this from happening, the government ultimately established the National Bank Restructuring Agency (IBRA) through Presidential Decree No. 27 of 1998, which served to revitalize the banking industry. It also granted independence to Bank Indonesia. The IBRA manages a total of approximately 640 trillion rupiah (US$75.3 billion at the time) in government funds disbursed for bank restructuring. These funds consist of bank recapitalization funds and Bank Indonesia Liquidity Assistance (BLBI) funds. To save the banks that were not liquid, Bank Indonesia finally distributed aid to the collapsed banks, known as Indonesian Liquidity Assistance to 48 problematic banks.

== BLBI corruption cases ==
Many BLBI funds were misappropriated by recipients, and the distribution process was also fraught with irregularities. Several former BI directors have been convicted of BLBI misappropriation, including Paul Sutopo Tjokronegoro, Hendro Budiyanto, and Heru Supratomo.

=== Bank Servitia ===
In 2002, Bank Servitia director general David Nusa Wijaya was named as suspect to the misuse of BLBI fund by the West Jakartan court. David was allegedly misused 1,291 trillion rupiah (US$138.59 billion at the time) worth of BLBI fund. Initially the court sentenced David for 4 years in prison with fines but was later added to 8 years prison sentence in 2003. Upon hearing the verdict, David fled to the United States and was arrested and extradited in 2006.
