= August 1928 =

Month of 1928

<<	August 1928					>>
Su	Mo	Tu	We	Th	Fr	Sa
			1	2	3	4
5	6	7	8	9	10	11
12	13	14	15	16	17	18
19	20	21	22	23	24	25
26	27	28	29	30	31

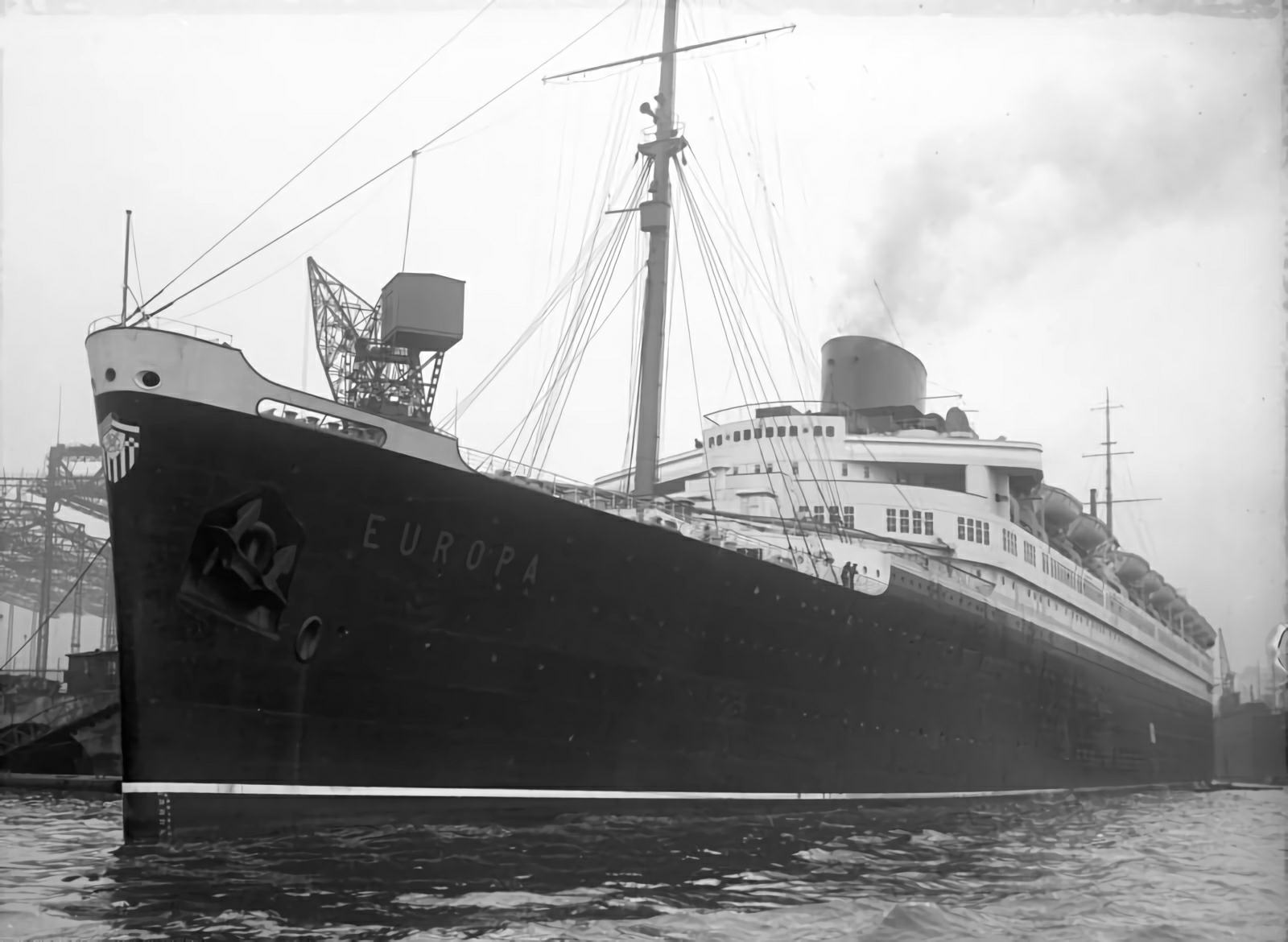
August 15, 1928: Germany launches the high-tech luxury liner SS Europa

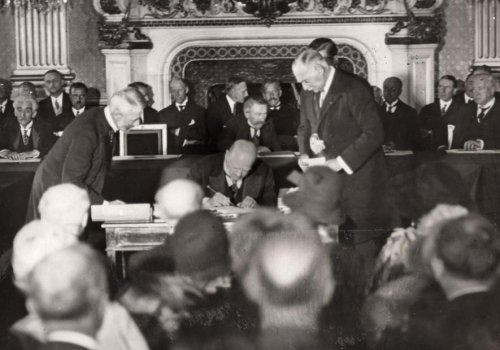
August 27, 1928: Germany's Foreign Minister Gustav Streseman joins others in signing Kellogg-Briand Peace Pact in Paris, renouncing "war as an instrument of national policy"

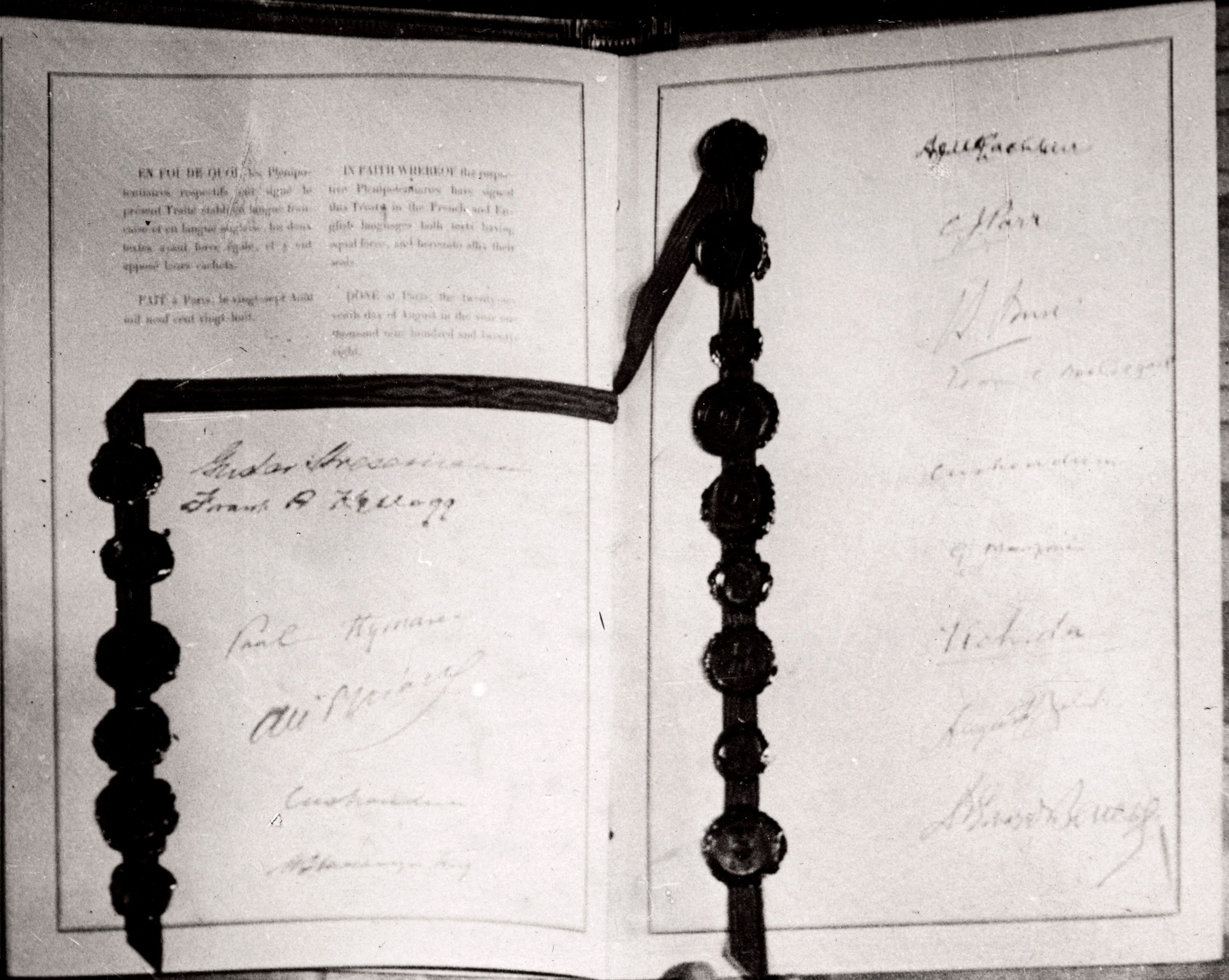
The Kellogg-Briand Pact and seals from 15 signatory nations

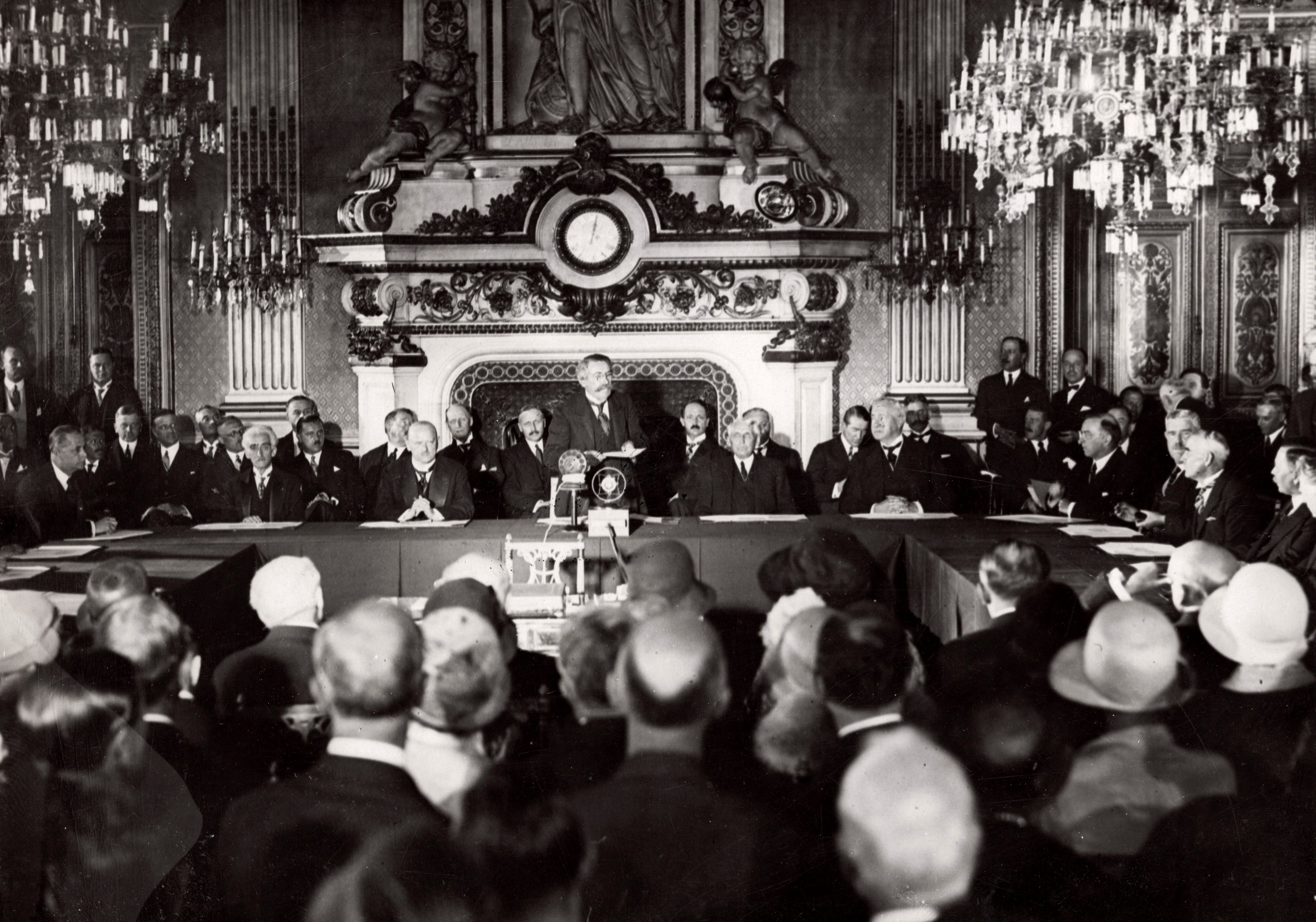
France's Foreign Minister Aristide Briand addresses the assembled representatives

The following events occurred in August 1928:

== Wednesday, August 1, 1928 ==
- Croatian deputies withdrew from the Yugoslavian National Assembly and set up a separatist parliament in Zagreb. They said that they would not recognize any decisions made in Yugoslavian parliament as binding in Croatia.

== Thursday, August 2, 1928 ==
- Italy and Ethiopia signed a friendship treaty.
- The South Indian Railway Strike ended.

== Friday, August 3, 1928 ==
- The Easter Act was among many bills granted Royal Assent in Britain. The act fixed the date of Easter as the Sunday following the second Saturday of April. No government has ever followed up by issuing the implementation order, but the legislation has never been repealed.
- Born: Henning Moritzen, film actor, in Tårbæk, Denmark (d. 2012)
- Died: Jovan Avakumović, 87, President of the Ministry of Serbia 1892–1893

== Saturday, August 4, 1928 ==
- A volcanic eruption occurred at Paluweh in the Dutch East Indies, causing a tsunami that killed at least 160 people and affecting the global climate.
- A group of 11,000 Britons conducted a pilgrimage to the battlefields of northern France on the fourteenth anniversary of the British declaration of war on Germany.
- The anniversary was marked in Berlin with a huge anti-war demonstration organized by communists outside the City Palace. 600 red flags were dipped as the crowd sang "The Internationale" and took an oath to boycott war.

== Sunday, August 5, 1928 ==
- About 1,000 communists were arrested in Paris for trying to mount an anti-war demonstration in Ivry-sur-Seine in defiance of the government.
- Born: Bogdan Maglich, nuclear physicist, in Sombor, Yugoslavia (d. 2017)

== Monday, August 6, 1928 ==
- All 31 crew members were killed when the Italian submarine F-14 sank, following a collision with the Italian destroyer Giuseppe Missori west of the Brijuni Islands. When the F-14 was raised 34 hours after, it was found that the entire crew had died from chlorine gas that had been released when salt water flooded the submarine's storage batteries.
- Born: Andy Warhol, pop artist, in Pittsburgh, Pennsylvania (d. 1987)

== Tuesday, August 7, 1928 ==
- Italy tightened its emigration laws, making it harder for Italians to reunite with relatives living abroad. Wives and sons could still join emigrated husbands and fathers, but only if they were dependent on them. Sisters had to be unmarried in order to join their brothers.
- Born: James Randi, stage magician and scientific skeptic, in Toronto, Canada (d. 2020)

== Wednesday, August 8, 1928 ==
- The Fort Pierce hurricane made landfall in the United States.
- The engagement of retired boxing champion Gene Tunney and socialite Mary Lauder was announced.
- Born:
  - Simón Díaz, Venezuelan composer, in Barbacoas, Aragua (d. 2014)
  - Jane Stoll, baseball player, in West Point, Pennsylvania (d. 2000)
- Died:
  - George E. Brennan, 63, Democratic party boss in Illinois
  - Stjepan Radić, 57, Croatian politician, died of wounds sustained in the June 20 parliament shooting

== Thursday, August 9, 1928 ==
- The island of Palu'e was reported to have been virtually destroyed by the eruption of the Rokatinda volcano, killing up to 1,000 people and wiping out six villages.
- Born:
  - Bob Cousy, American pro basketball player and Basketball Hall of Fame honoree, in Manhattan
  - Harold Johnson, American boxer, in Manayunk, Pennsylvania (d. 2015)

== Friday, August 10, 1928 ==
- Pierre du Pont endorsed Al Smith for president due to his pledge to reform Prohibition.
- Born:
  - Jimmy Dean, country music singer, actor and businessman, in Varina, Virginia (d. 2010)
  - Eddie Fisher, entertainer, in Philadelphia (d. 2010)
- Died: Rex Cherryman, 31, American actor, septic poisoning

== Saturday, August 11, 1928 ==
- U.S. Secretary of Commerce Herbert Hoover formally accepted the Republican nomination for president in a speech at Stanford University Stadium.
- Weimar Germany celebrated its ninth birthday; the government decreed that August 11 would thereafter be a national holiday.

== Sunday, August 12, 1928 ==
- The closing ceremony for the Summer Olympics was held. The United States won the medal count with 22 gold medals and 56 total.
- Four were killed in Heerlen, Netherlands when a plane crashed among spectators during an air show.
- The Argentine National Congress named Hipólito Yrigoyen the president-elect.
- Born: Bob Buhl, baseball player, in Saginaw, Michigan (d. 2001)
- Died: Leoš Janáček, 74, Czech composer

== Monday, August 13, 1928 ==
- In a test of Britain's defenses against an aerial attack, 250 Royal Air Force planes waged a mock nighttime air battle in the skies over London. An official report said that eight out of ten bomber raids were intercepted.
- The Treaty of Nettuno was ratified in the Kingdom of Yugoslavia by a single vote.
- The adventure comic strip Tim Tyler's Luck first appeared.

== Tuesday, August 14, 1928 ==
- The second night of aerial war maneuvers were conducted over London. It was reported that vital sections of the city would have been bombed to ruins if the air raid had been real.

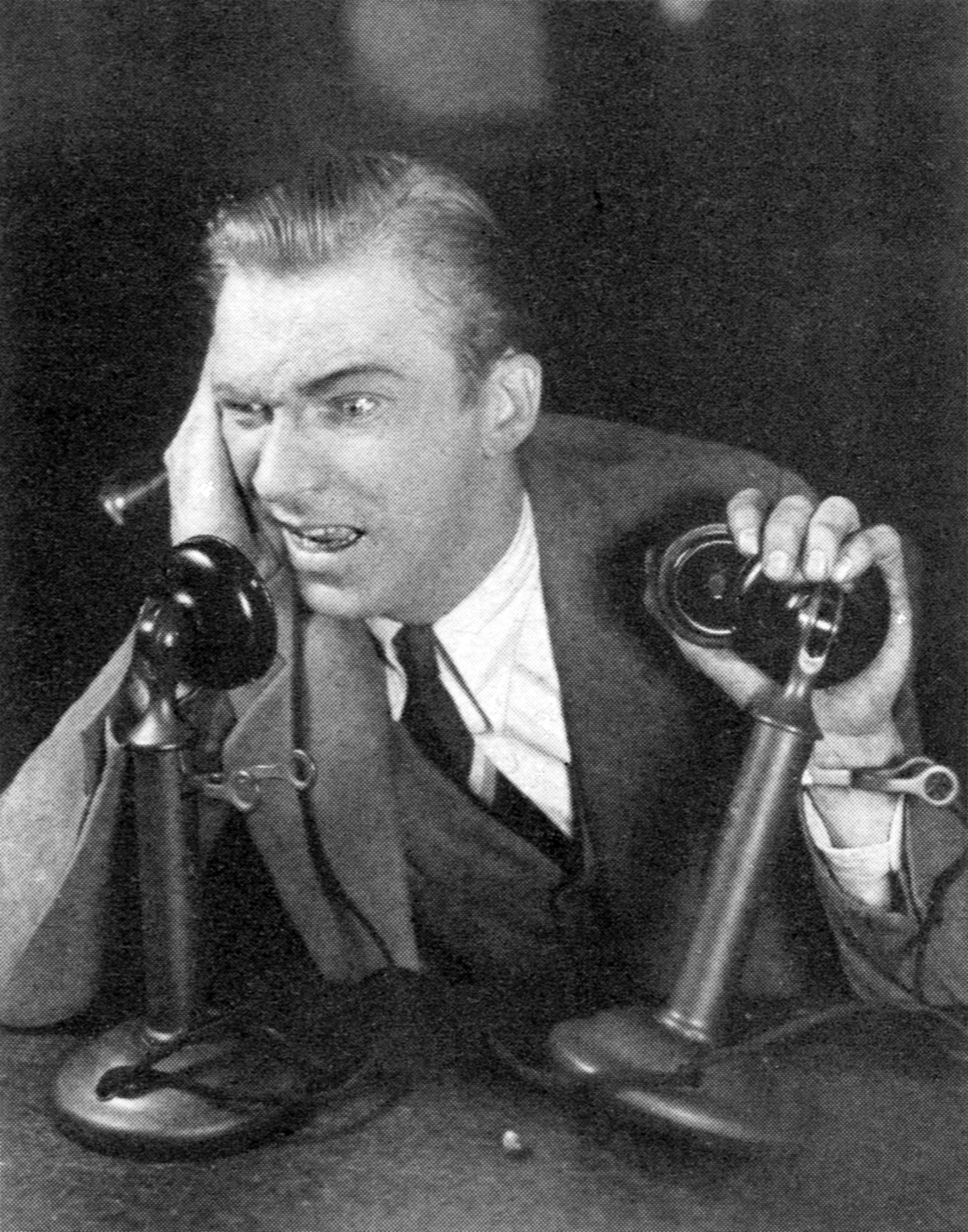
Lee Tracy originates the role of Editor Hildy Johnson

- The stage comedy The Front Page, adapted for three films and several television series, opened on Broadway.

== Wednesday, August 15, 1928 ==
- The German ocean-liner SS Europa was launched from Hamburg's Blohm & Voss shipyard.
- Bill Dickey made his major league baseball debut with the New York Yankees, going 0-for-2 against the Chicago White Sox in an 8–4 loss.
- The Mexican football club Unión de Curtidores was founded.
- Born: Nicolas Roeg, film director and cinematographer, in London, England (d. 2018)

== Thursday, August 16, 1928 ==
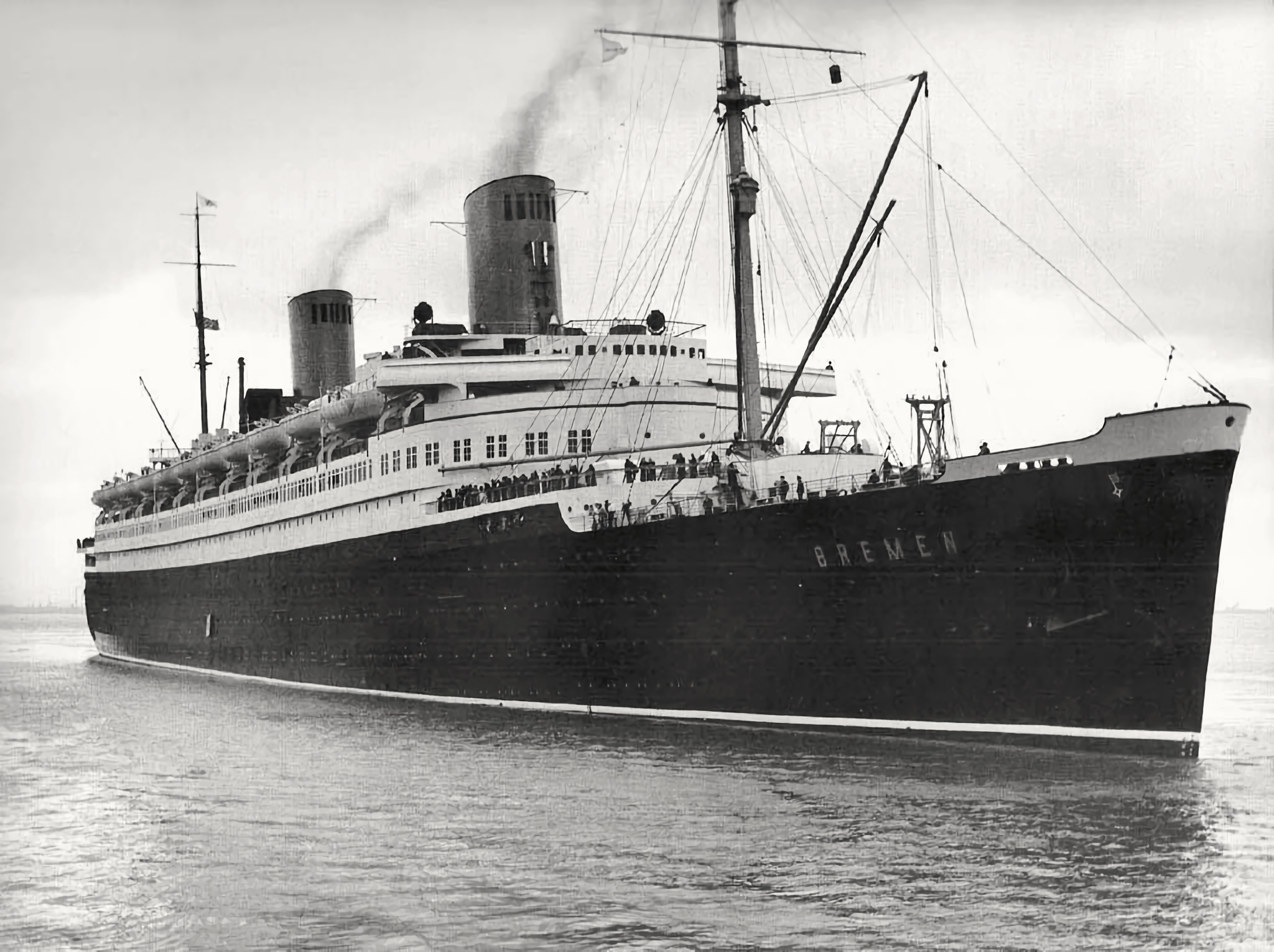
SS Bremen

- The German ocean liner SS Bremen was launched the day after the launch of her sister ship, SS Europa.
- Born: Ann Blyth, actress, in Mount Kisco, New York
- Born: Eydie Gormé, singer, in the Bronx (d. 2013)
- Died: Carlo Del Prete, 30, Italian aviator, died of injuries sustained five days earlier in a plane crash

== Friday, August 17, 1928 ==
- Aerial maneuvers over London ended in the morning, with experts in agreement that British air defenses were inadequate. Fast bombers were found to be the most successful type of plane.
- American stage and film actress Helen Hayes and playwright Charles MacArthur were married in New York.
- Born: Willem Duys, radio and television presenter, commentator, tennis player and music producer (d. 2011)
- Died: Frank Urson, 41, American film director, drowned

== Saturday, August 18, 1928 ==
- A tropical storm swept Haiti, killing about 200 people and doing an estimated $1 million property damage.
- Born:
  - Theodore Millon, American psychologist (d. 2014)
  - Marge Schott, controversial American baseball team owner who owned the Cincinnati Reds; in Cincinnati, Ohio (d. 2004)

== Sunday, August 19, 1928 ==
- Parliamentary elections were held in Greece for the Vouli, the lower house of the Hellenic Parliament, in the first elections held since the 1927 Constitution was promulgated. The Liberal Party of Prime Minister Eleftherios Venizelos won 178 of the 250 seats for a majority, after having had only one-third of the seats in the previous election.
- Born: Queen Ratna of Nepal, in Kathmandu
- Died: Richard Haldane, 1st Viscount Haldane, 72, British politician, lawyer and philosopher

== Monday, August 20, 1928 ==
- U.S. Army Colonel Art Goebel completed the first west to east, non-stop flight across the United States in 18 hours 58 minutes.
- Tornadoes swept through Iowa and southern Minnesota, killing 8 people.
- Born: Ed Sandford, ice hockey player, in New Toronto, Canada (d.2023)
- Died: George Brinton McClellan Harvey, 64, American diplomat and journalist

== Tuesday, August 21, 1928 ==
- An editorial in the Italian newspaper Tevere ridiculed the Kellogg–Briand Pact, saying the signatories were not sincere about wanting to abolish war.
- United Artists executive Joseph M. Schenck said that talkies were just a fad and that "people will not want talking pictures long."

== Wednesday, August 22, 1928 ==
- William F. Whiting replaced Herbert Hoover as U.S. Secretary of Commerce.
- Born: Karlheinz Stockhausen, composer, in Burg-Mödrath, Germany (d. 2007)
- Died: Byron F. Ritchie, 75, U.S. Representative from Ohio

== Thursday, August 23, 1928 ==
- New York Governor Al Smith formally accepted the Democratic nomination for president in a speech in Albany. The planned ceremony in the park outside the Capitol was driven indoors due to rain, so 25,000 stood in the downpour to hear Smith's speech from inside the Assembly Chamber over loudspeakers. WGY of Schenectady televised the event and became the first television station to transmit a remote broadcast.
- Born: Marian Seldes, actress, in Manhattan (d. 2014)

== Friday, August 24, 1928 ==
- The derailment of a train in Times Square in New York City killed 18 people and injured 100 shortly after the train departed the Times Square station.
- 52-year-old George H. Brown of Lampasas, Texas, was fatally burned when he fell into a hot spring at Midway Geyser Basin in Yellowstone National Park.
- U.S. Secretary of State Frank B. Kellogg arrived in Paris to sign the international anti-war pact.

== Saturday, August 25, 1928 ==
- Architect Frank Lloyd Wright married his third wife Olga Lazovich in San Diego.
- Born: Herbert Kroemer, professor of electrical and computer engineering, in Weimar, Germany (d. 2024)

== Sunday, August 26, 1928 ==
- Actress Barbara Stanwyck and vaudeville comedian Frank Fay were married in St. Louis.
- Born:
  - Zdeněk Veselovský, zoologist, in Czechoslovakia (d. 2006)
  - Yvette Vickers, actress, model and singer, in Kansas City, Missouri (d. c.2010, her mummified body was discovered in April 2010)

== Monday, August 27, 1928 ==
- Representatives from 15 nations signed the Kellogg–Briand Pact in Paris, renouncing war as an instrument of foreign policy.
- Died: Émile Fayolle, 70, French military commander

== Tuesday, August 28, 1928 ==
- The Kingdom of Yugoslavia signed the Kellogg–Briand Pact.

== Wednesday, August 29, 1928 ==
- The Albanian National Assembly appointed a committee to frame a "special emergency" bill that would change the republic to a monarchy.
- Born: Dick O'Neill, actor, in New York City (d. 1998)

== Thursday, August 30, 1928 ==
- General Order 40 reallocated the commercial broadcast radio spectrum in the United States.
- Died: Wilhelm Wien, 64, German physicist

== Friday, August 31, 1928 ==
- The Threepenny Opera by Bertolt Brecht and Kurt Weill premiered at the Theater am Schiffbauerdamm in Berlin.
- Wreckage from Roald Amundsen's seaplane was found near Tromsø. The French consul examined a pontoon and positively identified it as belonging to the plane Amundsen and his crew departed in on June 18.
- Amelia Earhart crashed her biplane at Rogers Field near Pittsburgh when the landing gear broke after hitting a rut during touchdown. Earhart and passenger George P. Putnam were uninjured.
- Born:
  - James Coburn, American TV actor; in Laurel, Nebraska (d. 2002)
  - Jaime Sin, Filipino Roman Catholic Cardinal and Archbishop of Manila; in New Washington, Aklan (d. 2005)
