= June 1928 =

Month of 1928

<<	June 1928					>>
Su	Mo	Tu	We	Th	Fr	Sa
					1	2
3	4	5	6	7	8	9
10	11	12	13	14	15	16
17	18	19	20	21	22	23
24	25	26	27	28	29	30

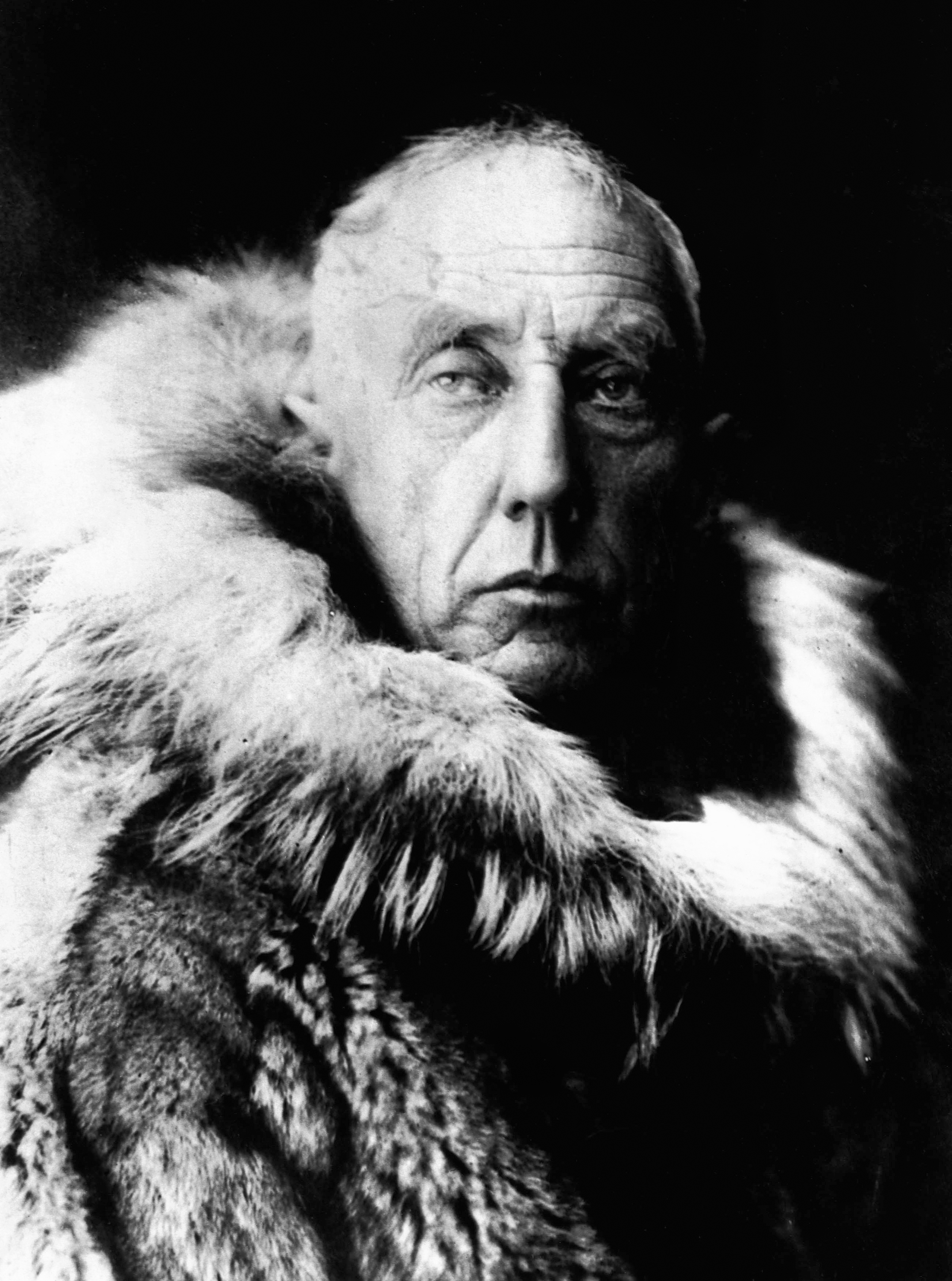
June 18, 1928: Norwegian Antarctic hero Roald Amundsen disappears with four others after flying on rescue mission

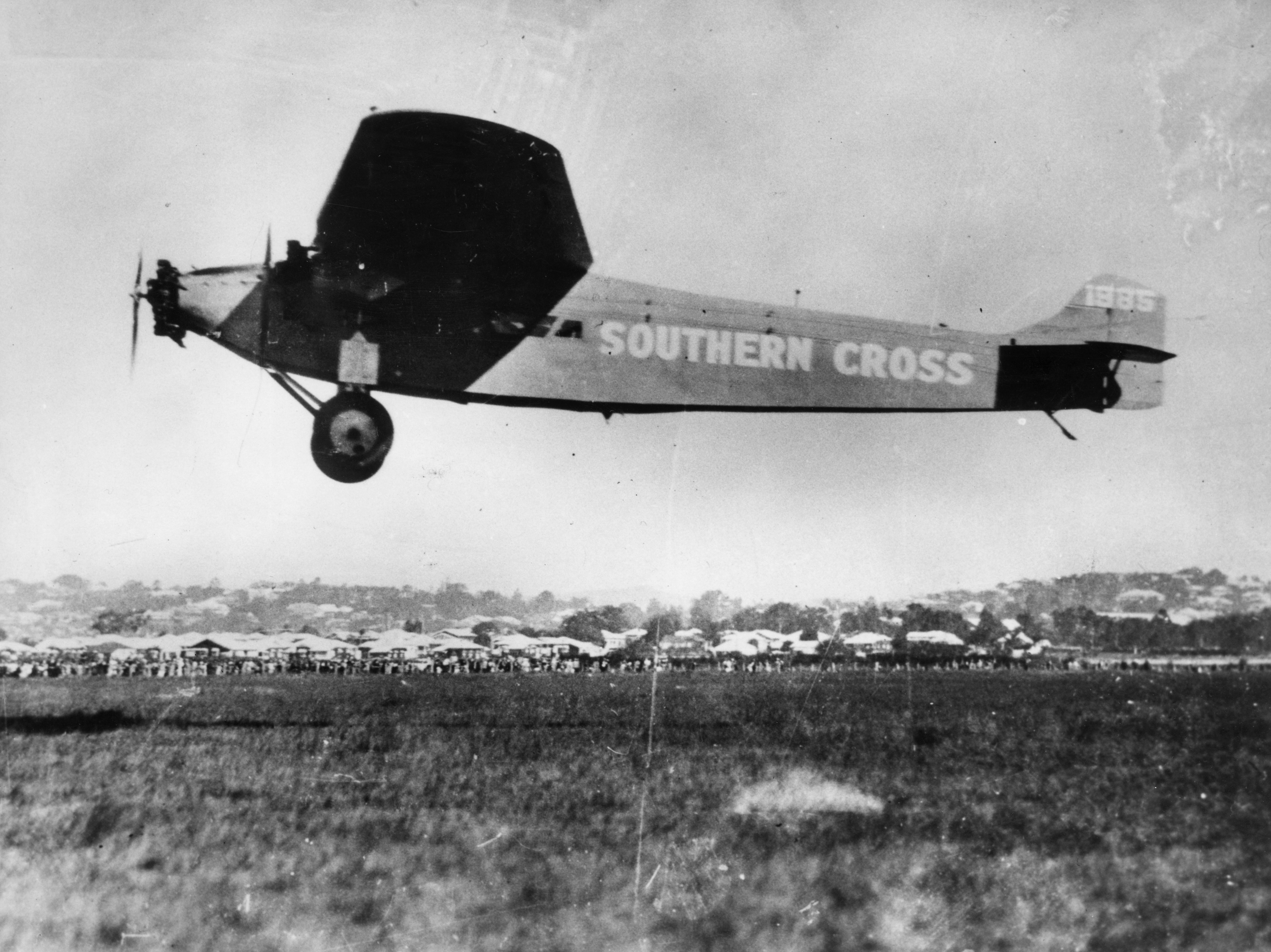
June 9, 1928: Australian and American crew complete first airplane trip from U.S. to Australia

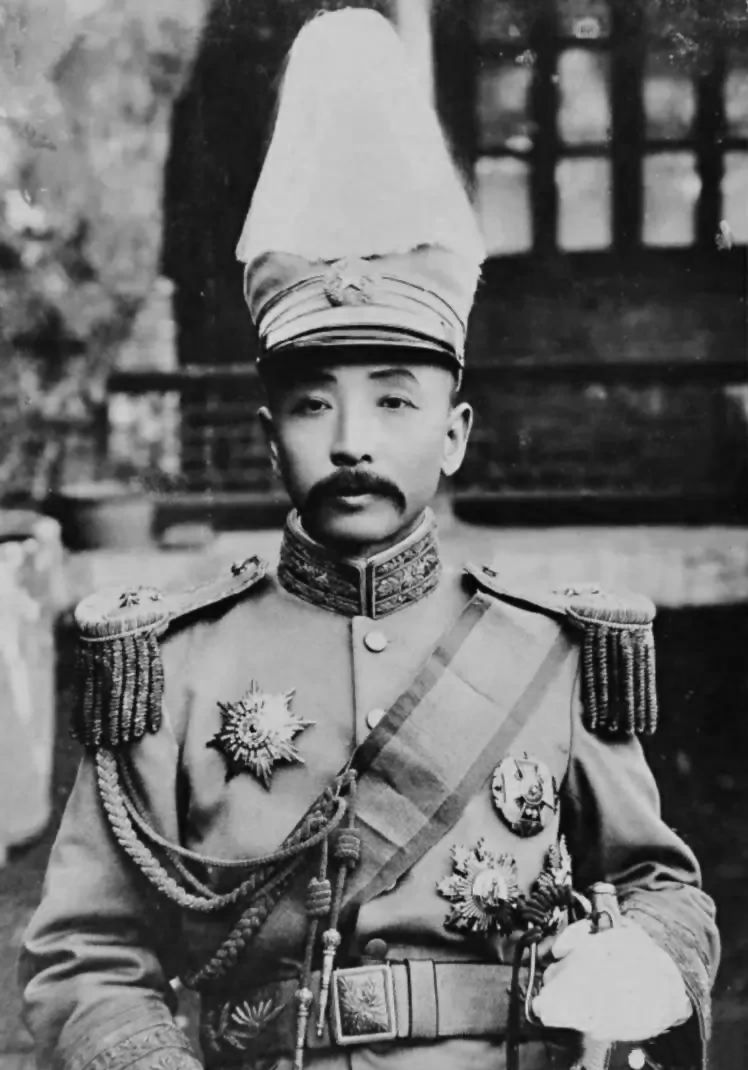
June 4, 1928: Chinese warlord Zhang Zuo-lin assassinated in bombing of train

The following events occurred in June 1928:

== Friday, June 1, 1928 ==
- The crew of the Southern Cross landed at Wheeler Field in Hawaii after 27 hours 28 minutes in the first leg of their trans-Pacific flight.
- Born:
  - Georgy Dobrovolsky, Soviet cosmonaut, in Odessa, Ukrainian SSR (killed on Soyuz 11 mission, 1971)
  - Bob Monkhouse, British comedian and game show host, in Beckenham, Kent (d. 2003)

== Saturday, June 2, 1928 ==
- Italian aviators Arturo Ferrarin and Carlo Del Prete completed 58 hours and 37 minutes in the air, a new world record.
- A new copyright law was signed at an international conference in Rome establishing the concept of "automatic copyright", whereby creative works are immediately copyrighted without need of further formalities on the part of their creators.

== Sunday, June 3, 1928 ==
- Fengtian warlord Zhang Zuolin abandoned Beijing, departing by train. "This fighting has reduced many to homelessness and starvation of an extent beyond description. If we continue to fight, these people will only suffer more", Zhang said in his farewell message. "Hoping that China will not be exterminated as a result of my management of its affairs, and hoping that the bolshevist peril which I suppressed will not be revived, I declare myself innocent and my conscience clear before the world and before all future generations."
- The Southern Cross took off from Barking Sands, Hawaii, at dawn, heading for Fiji.
- Born: Donald Judd, artist, in Excelsior Springs, Missouri (d. 1994)

== Monday, June 4, 1928 ==
- Huanggutun Incident: Zhang Zuolin was assassinated when his train was destroyed in an explosion.
- The Southern Cross landed in Suva, Fiji, after 34 hours 33 minutes in the air.
- The United States Supreme Court decided Olmstead v. United States.
- The birthday honours list of King George V drew fire from women's groups for only including two women.
- Died: Zhang Zuolin, 53, Manchurian warlord

== Tuesday, June 5, 1928 ==
- House and Senate elections were conducted in the Philippines with the Nacionalista Party winning a strong mandate.

== Wednesday, June 6, 1928 ==
- Felstead won The Derby.
- Died: Luigi Bianchi, 72, Italian mathematician

== Thursday, June 7, 1928 ==
- A fire broke out that caused an explosion at the Russian Eagle Café in Hollywood during a party attended by Charlie Chaplin, John McCormick, Colleen Moore, Jack Dempsey, Estelle Taylor, Richard Dix and others. Two were critically injured in the blast; a Russian man who spoke little English was arrested in connection with the incident.

== Friday, June 8, 1928 ==
- Japanese Prime Minister Tanaka Giichi survived an assassination attempt when a man tried to stab him as he was boarding a train.
- The Southern Cross took off from Fiji on the final leg of the trans-Pacific flight to Australia.

== Saturday, June 9, 1928 ==
- The Southern Cross landed at Brisbane, Australia at 10:10 a.m., completing the trans-Pacific flight after 7,300 miles and 83 hours 21 minutes in the air.
- A crowd of 3,000 people turned out in New York City to bid farewell to the crew of the Bremen as they sailed for Hamburg aboard the SS Columbus.
- Born: Bob Bolling, American comic artist and writer, in Brockton, Massachusetts

== Sunday, June 10, 1928 ==
- A railway accident killed 25 people in Germany when the express train between Munich and Cologne derailed.
- The Southern Cross flew to Sydney.
- Uruguay and Argentina drew 1–1 in the gold medal football game at the Amsterdam Summer Olympics. A replay was scheduled for three days later.
- Born: Maurice Sendak, American children's author and illustrator, in Brooklyn (d. 2012)

== Monday, June 11, 1928 ==
- Tobacco workers in Greece went on strike.
- In Germany, test pilot Fritz Stamer made the world's first flight of a rocket-powered airplane, the Lippisch Ente, flying for 4,900 feet (1,500 m). The aircraft was destroyed on another attempt, with Stamer barely escaping.
- The Credit Institute of Canada was created.
- Born: Queen Fabiola of Belgium, in Stuyvenberg Castle, Laeken (d. 2014)
- Died: William V. Chambliss, 61, American farmer, businessman, and teacher

== Tuesday, June 12, 1928 ==
- The Republican National Convention opened in Kansas City, Missouri. Herbert Hoover was expected to win the presidential nomination easily, so most of the speculation was about who would be chosen as his running mate.
- Striking Greek tobacco workers clashed with government troops at Kavala, headquarters of the American Tobacco Company.
- While working on the building of the first Navajo Bridge, 42-year-old construction worker Lane McDaniels of Kansas City fell about 470 feet (140 m) to his death in the Colorado River. There was no safety netting under the bridge because supervisors were concerned that falling hot rivets might set it on fire.
- Born:
  - Paul Ronty, Canadian ice hockey player, in Toronto (d. 2020)
  - Richard M. Sherman, American songwriter and music director, in New York City (d. 2024)
- Died: Salvador Díaz Mirón, 74, Mexican poet

== Wednesday, June 13, 1928 ==
- Uruguay defeated Argentina 2–1 in the Olympic gold medal football game in Amsterdam.
- Ten were wounded in Drama, Greece in fighting between troops and striking tobacco workers.
- Born:
  - John Forbes Nash, Jr., mathematician and Nobel Laureate profiled in the book and film A Beautiful Mind; in Bluefield, West Virginia (killed in auto accident, 2015)
  - Li Ka-shing, Hong Kong business magnate, investor and philanthropist, in Chaozhou, China.

== Thursday, June 14, 1928 ==
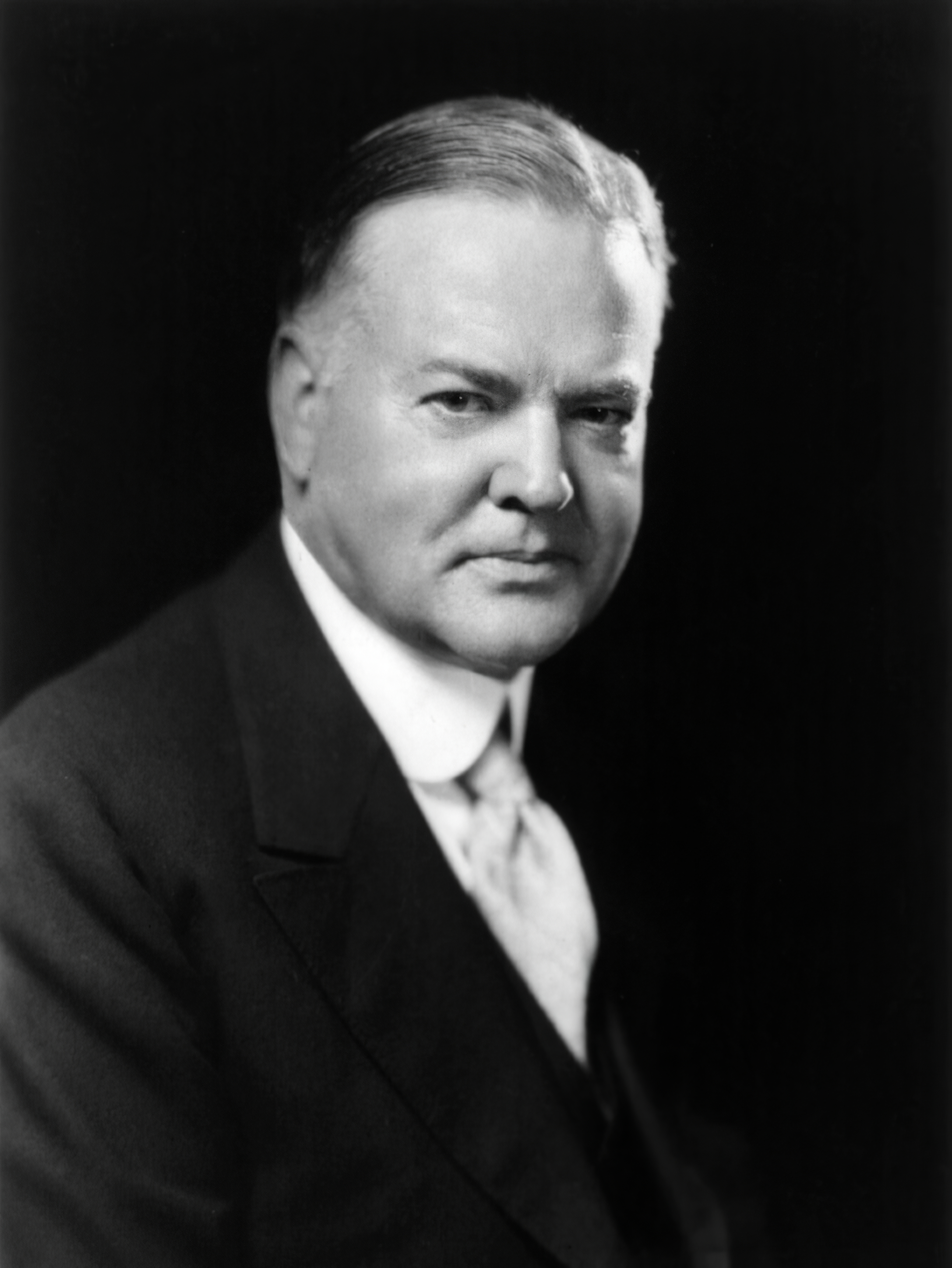
Hoover

- U.S. Secretary of Commerce Herbert Hoover was unanimously chosen as the Republican nominee for President of the United States.
- The Republican convention voted to approve a campaign policy of "observance and vigorous enforcement" of the Eighteenth Amendment to the United States Constitution.
- The British House of Commons rejected a proposed revision to the Book of Common Prayer by a vote of 266 to 220.
- Born: Che Guevara, Latin American Marxist revolutionary, in Rosario, Santa Fe, Argentina (killed, 1967)
- Died:
  - Emmeline Pankhurst, 69, British women's suffrage leader
  - Con Daily, 63, American baseball player

== Friday, June 15, 1928 ==
- Charles Curtis of Kansas was named Herbert Hoover's running mate on the final day of the Republican Convention.

== Saturday, June 16, 1928 ==
- Bill Regan became the first Boston Red Sox player to hit two home runs in the same inning during a 10–5 win over the Chicago White Sox. He accomplished the feat in the fourth inning, and his second homer was inside-the-park.
- Born: Annie Cordy (stage name for Léonie Cooreman), Belgian actress and singer, in Laeken (d. 2020)
- Died: Mark Keppel, 61, Superintendent of Los Angeles County Schools

== Sunday, June 17, 1928 ==
- The Fokker F.VIIb/3m Friendship with a three-person crew (Wilmer Stultz, Louis Gordon and Amelia Earhart) departed Trepassey, Newfoundland attempting a transatlantic flight.
- Communists induced electricians and railway workers to join the striking tobacco workers in Greece.
- Two search planes flew over Umberto Nobile and the surviving crew of the Italia in the Arctic, but efforts to signal the planes failed.
- Born: Willard Nixon, baseball player, in Taylorsville, Georgia (d. 2000)

== Monday, June 18, 1928 ==
- Roald Amundsen and four crewmen took off from outside Tromsø, Norway in an effort to find the missing crew of the Italia. They were never seen again.
- The Friendship touched down at Burry Port, Wales, after a 20-hour, 40 minute flight. Amelia Earhart entered the record books as the first woman to fly across the Atlantic Ocean, and quickly became a celebrity.

== Tuesday, June 19, 1928 ==
- The Friendship flew to Southampton, the original goal of the transatlantic flight, to a raucous welcome. They then traveled to London by car, where Wilmer Stultz and Lou Gordon were not recognized but the huge crowd cheered Amelia Earhart.
- Born:
  - Tommy DeVito, American musician (The Four Seasons), in Belleville, New Jersey (d. 2020)
  - Nancy Marchand, American actress, in Buffalo, New York (d. 2000)

== Wednesday, June 20, 1928 ==
- During a heated session in the Yugoslavian National Assembly, Puniša Račić of the People's Radical Party drew a pistol and opened fire, killing two Croatian members of parliament (Pavle Radić and Đuro Basariček) and wounding three (Ivan Granđa, Ivan Pernar and President of the Croatian People's Peasant Party Stjepan Radić).
- An Italian airman located the stranded crew of the Italia and dropped relief supplies.
- Born: Eric Dolphy, American jazz musician, in Los Angeles (died of diabetes, 1964)

== Thursday, June 21, 1928 ==
- Three people were killed and 40 were wounded in anti-government rioting in the Croatian capital of Zagreb following the Yugoslavian National Assembly shooting.
- In the ninth inning of the second game of a doubleheader at Wrigley Field between the Chicago Cubs and the St. Louis Cardinals, outfielder Hack Wilson charged into the stands and attacked a heckler who had been yelling insults at him all game long. About 5,000 fans rushed onto the field and the game was delayed for twelve minutes before order was restored.

== Friday, June 22, 1928 ==
- An oxygen tank explosion in Belgium at Bruges killed 13 people and injured 40.
- King Alexander of Yugoslavia urged his countrymen to stop rioting after 100 more people were injured (four fatally) in rioting in Zagreb. The violence continued as the bodies of the two slain Croatian politicians arrived in the city by train to lie in state.
- Hack Wilson was fined $100 by National League President John Heydler for his actions of the day before. The heckler Wilson attacked appeared in court and was fined $1.
- Died:
  - A. B. Frost, 77, American illustrator
  - George Siegmann, 46, American film actor

== Saturday, June 23, 1928 ==
- Swedish pilot Einar Lundborg rescued Umberto Nobile, the injured captain of the Italia. Nobile protested against being rescued first, but his crewmen persuaded him to go so he could direct the rest of the operation from the baseship.
- The Kellogg–Briand proposal to outlaw war as an instrument of foreign policy was sent to various countries around the world.
- The National Party of Scotland was founded.
- The Glenn Miller and Benny Goodman instrumental "Room 1411" was recorded by Bennie Goodman's Boys.
- Born: Pete Ladygo, American and Canadian football player, in West Brownsville, Pennsylvania (d. 2014)
- Died: Malachi Kittridge, 58, American baseball player

== Sunday, June 24, 1928 ==
- Johnny Farrell defeated Bobby Jones in a playoff to win the U.S. Open.
- Einar Lundborg returned to the site of the stranded Italia crew but crashed and became stranded along with them. No further rescue flights would be made for almost two weeks due to weather.
- Died: Holbrook Blinn, 56, American stage and film actor

== Monday, June 25, 1928 ==
- The silent film The Red Dance premiered at the Globe Theatre in New York City. It was preceded by the debut of the newsreel Shaw Talks for Movietone News, in which American audiences got their first opportunity to hear the voice of George Bernard Shaw. The Irish playwright displayed some of his signature wit as he jovially addressed his imaginary audience and performed a visual impression of Benito Mussolini.
- Born:
  - Alexei Alexeyevich Abrikosov, Soviet theoretical physicist and Nobel Prize laureate, in Moscow (d. 2017)
  - Paul "Tank" Younger, African-American pro football player, in Grambling, Louisiana (d. 2001)

== Tuesday, June 26, 1928 ==
- The Democratic National Convention opened in Houston, Texas. There was little doubt that Al Smith and Joseph T. Robinson would be nominated for the presidential ticket, so most speculation was about what policy the party would adopt on the matter of Prohibition. Governor Smith remained in Albany and did not attend the convention himself.
- Chicago mobster and labor racketeer Timothy D. Murphy was shot dead at his home by gunfire from a passing automobile.
- Born:
  - Jacob Druckman, American composer, in Philadelphia (d. 1996)
  - Yoshiro Nakamatsu, Japanese inventor and entertainer; in Tokyo

== Wednesday, June 27, 1928 ==
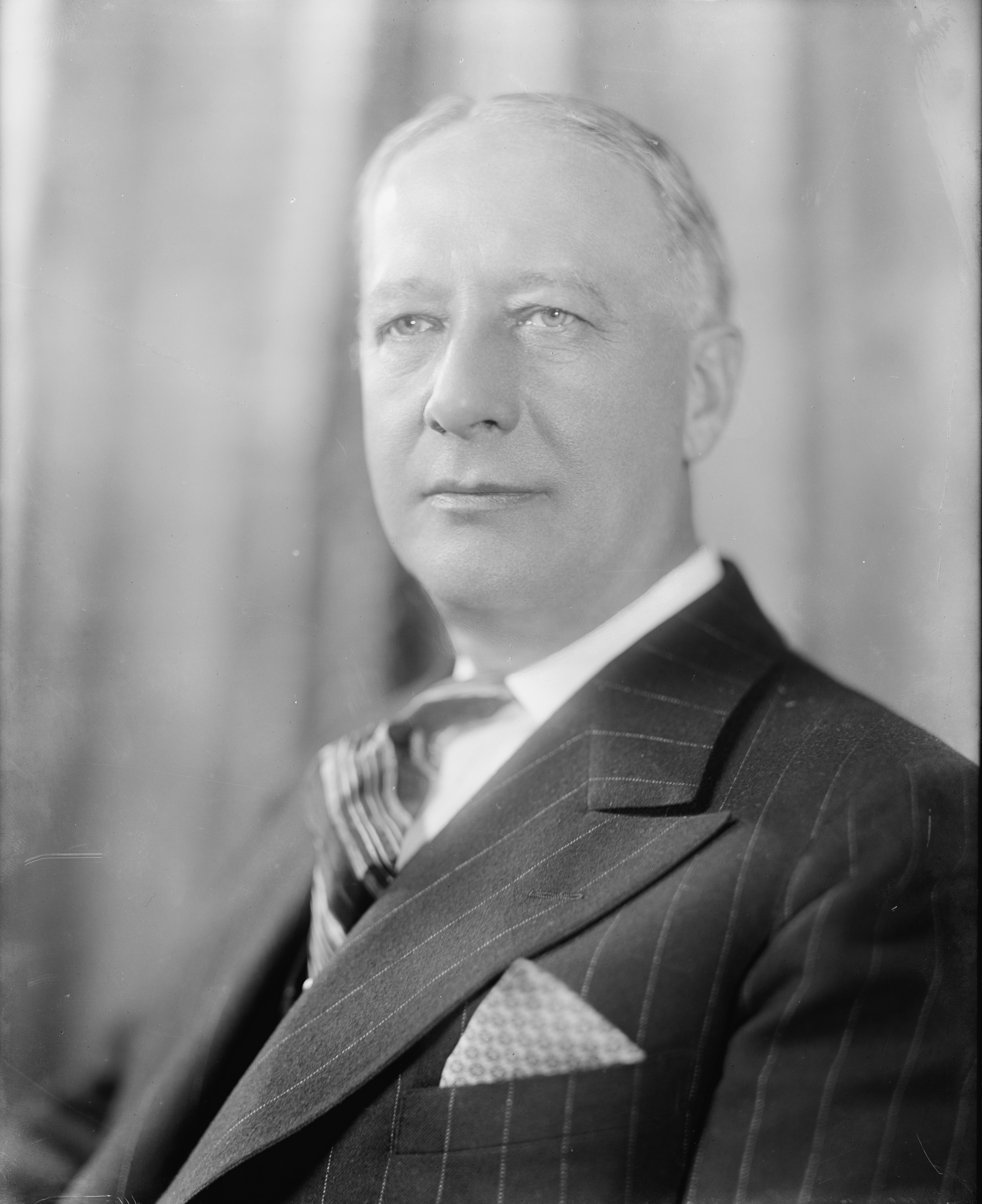
Governor Smith

- New York Governor Al Smith was formally nominated as a Democratic candidate at the National Convention. "Because of his power of leadership there is no doubt the governor will make an efficient president, a great president", Franklin D. Roosevelt said in the nomination address. "He again will place us among the nations of the world as a country which values its ideals as much as its material prosperity."
- The Darlington rail crash killed 25 people when two trains collided head-on at Darlington Bank Top station in County Durham, England.
- Born: Joe Giella, American comic book artist (d. 2023)
- Died: Louis-Philippe Normand, 64, Canadian physician

== Thursday, June 28, 1928 ==
- The keel of the first 1000 ft (300 m)-long ocean liner, Oceanic, for the British White Star Line, was laid by Harland and Wolff in Belfast; construction is delayed, and cancelled on 23 July 1929.
- Al Smith accepted the nomination for President of the United States at the Democratic National Convention, becoming the first Roman Catholic person in the U.S. to be nominated for president by a major political party.
- The Democratic Party pledged to enforce the Eighteenth Amendment to the United States Constitution.
- Herman Müller became Chancellor of Germany for the second time.
- The International Railway (New York–Ontario) switched to one-man crews for its trolleys in Canada.
- Born:
  - Hans Blix, Swedish diplomat and politician, Foreign Minister of Sweden 1978 to 1979; in Uppsala
  - Harold Evans, British journalist and writer, in Eccles, Lancashire (d. 2020)
- Died: Leo Ditrichstein, 63, Austrian-American actor and playwright

== Friday, June 29, 1928 ==
- Arkansas U.S. Senator Joseph T. Robinson was nominated for vice president on the final day of the Democratic National Convention.
- Al Smith wired the convention accepting the presidential nomination while saying he would enforce Prohibition if elected but would also seek its modification.
- The South Indian Railway Strike began.
- Prohibition enforcement agents conducted an early morning raid on almost every important nightclub in the Times Square district of New York City.
- Born: Jean-Louis Pesch, French comics writer; in Paris (d. 2023)

== Saturday, June 30, 1928 ==
- Attempts to rescue the remaining crew of the Italia became further complicated as the ice floe they were stranded upon began to break up.
- The airplane factory of the Polish government was destroyed by an incendiary fire.
- Born: Orhan Boran, radio and television host and actor, in Istanbul, Turkey (d. 2012)
