= July 1928 =

Month of 1928

<<	July 1928					>>
Su	Mo	Tu	We	Th	Fr	Sa
1	2	3	4	5	6	7
8	9	10	11	12	13	14
15	16	17	18	19	20	21
22	23	24	25	26	27	28
29	30	31

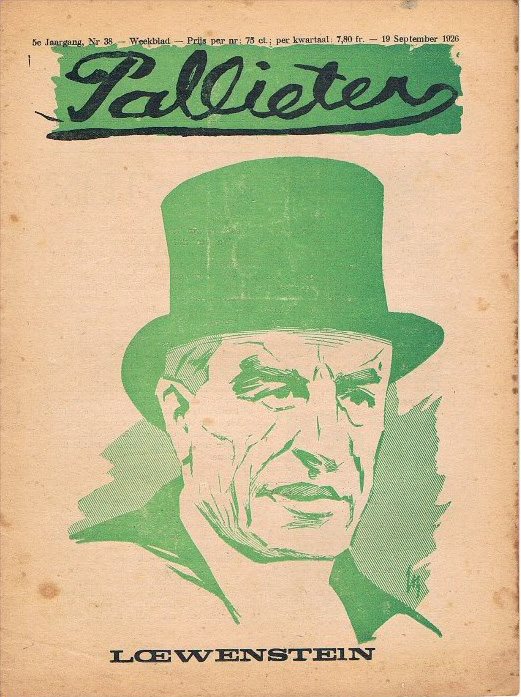
July 4, 1928: Wealthy Belgian financier Alfred Loewenstein killed after falling from airplane

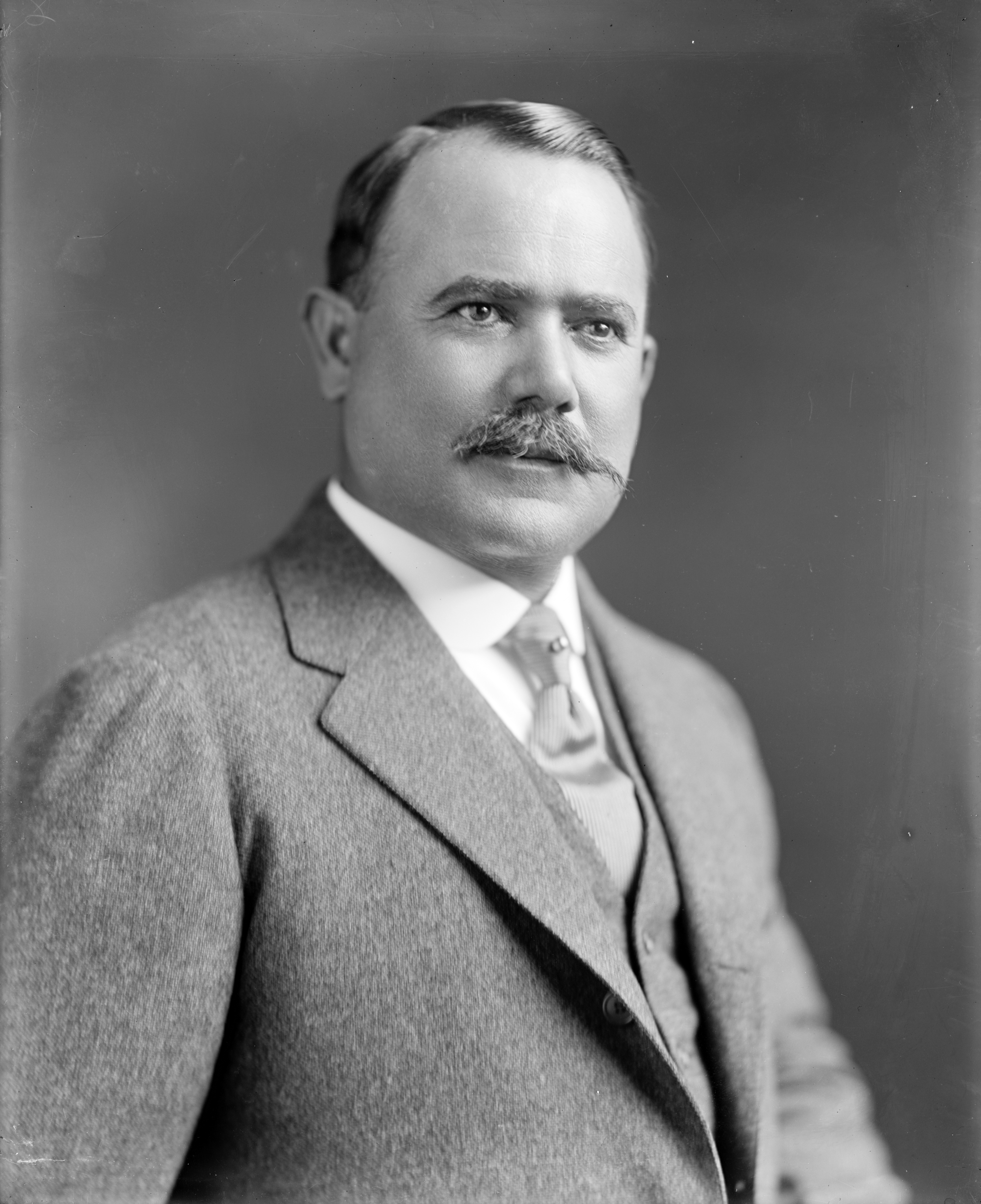
July 17, 1928: Mexican President-Elect Álvaro Obregón assassinated 16 days after election

The following events occurred in July 1928:

== Sunday, July 1, 1928 ==
- Álvaro Obregón was elected unopposed to succeed Plutarco Elías Calles as President of Mexico beginning December 1.
- The NBC-owned experimental television station W2XBS began operations in New York City with test broadcasts of the signals scanned by the RCA Photophone television scanning system. It would begin commercial broadcasts exactly 13 years later, on July 1, 1941, and is now the NBC flagship station WNBC.
- New York police ended a dance marathon after 20 days. The $8,600 prize money was distributed among the nine remaining couples.
- Died: Frankie Yale, 35, American gangster, was killed by submachine gun fire and a shotgun blast while driving in New York City.

== Monday, July 2, 1928 ==
- Prominent temperance activist Ernest Cherrington declared Al Smith the "most influential and powerful enemy of Prohibition that has ever appeared in public life" and urged all prohibitionists to unite against the Democratic presidential nominee.
- The Representation of the People (Equal Franchise) Act 1928 became law in the United Kingdom.
- Born: Iven Carl Kincheloe Jr., U.S. Air Force test pilot, aeronautical engineer and Korean War flying ace; in Detroit (d. 1958)

== Tuesday, July 3, 1928 ==
- Scottish inventor John Logie Baird successfully demonstrate the transmission of colour television for the first time. The demonstration transmitted pictures of eight-year-old Noele Gordon, "wearing different coloured hats".
- A prototype of the first commercially available television set, the General Electric "Octagon" scanning disk mechanical television, was unveiled by General Electric for possible manufacture and sale. Only four of the sets, which included a wooden cabinet in the style of furniture similar to radio receivers, were made and the Octagon was never marketed. The initial suggested retail price for the set was $75.00, equivalent to almost $1,200 in 2020.

== Wednesday, July 4, 1928 ==
- Eleftherios Venizelos became Prime Minister of Greece for the fifth time.
- Alfred Loewenstein, a Belgian financier and one of the wealthiest people in the world at the time with a fortune of 12 million pounds sterling (equivalent to $60 million in U.S. and to $950,000,000 in 2021), was killed after falling out of his privately owned airplane at an altitude of 4,000 feet (1,200 m). At the time, he and six other people were in a Fokker F.VII airliner flying over the English Channel from Croydon to Brussels. Loewenstein had last been seen walking to the rear of the aircraft to use the bathroom and had opened a door opposite the bathroom. His body was found on a beach in France eight days later.
- Daredevil Jean Lussier survived the stunt of being swept over Niagara Falls, using a specially constructed rubber ball 6 feet (1.8 m) in diameter. Although the rubber ball was heavily damaged, Lussier sustained only minor bruises after plunging 167 feet (51 m). Previous attempts at going over the Falls had been in wooden barrels; Lussier became only the fourth person to survive the stunt.
- Born:
  - Teofisto Guingona Jr., Filipino politician; in San Juan, Rizal
  - Chuck Tanner, baseball player and manager, in New Castle, Pennsylvania (d. 2011)

== Thursday, July 5, 1928 ==
- Italian aviators Arturo Ferrarin and Carlo Del Prete set a new distance record for sustained flight when they landed north of Natal, Brazil, 7,218 kilometres (4,485 mi) away from Montecelio, Italy where they took off from two days earlier.
- Born: Warren Oates, American film actor, in Depoy, Kentucky (d. 1982)

== Friday, July 6, 1928 ==
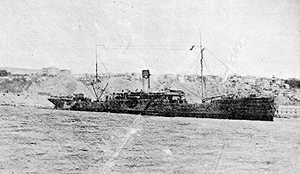
The Chilean naval transport Angamos

- The sinking of the Chilean Navy transport Angamos killed 262 of the 269 people on board when the vessel capsized in the Pacific Ocean off the coast of the port of Lebu. Only seven people were rescued. ''Angamos'', Chilean Navy website (in Spanish)
- Lights of New York, the first all-talking full-length film, premiered at the Strand Theatre in New York City.
- René Lacoste defeated Henri Cochet in the Gentleman's Singles Final of the Wimbledon tennis championships.
- The experimental television station W3XK began airing programming broadcast from the laboratory of Charles Francis Jenkins. Broadcasting began at 8:00 p.m. every night except Sunday, and initially consisted of short films lasting a few minutes each. The images were scanned at a resolution of 48 lines.
- A Swedish aviator landed at the site of the stranded Italia crew and rescued Einar Lundborg.
- Born: Nestor de Villa, Filipino actor, in Cabanatuan (d. 2004)

== Saturday, July 7, 1928 ==
- American, Helen Wills, retained her Wimbledon title, defeating Lilí Álvarez of Spain in a rematch of last year's Ladies' Singles Final.
- Two German aviators set a new flight duration record, staying aloft for 65 hours and 26 minutes flying back and forth between Dessau and Leipzig.
- The Plymouth automobile was introduced in an auto show at New York's Madison Square Garden.

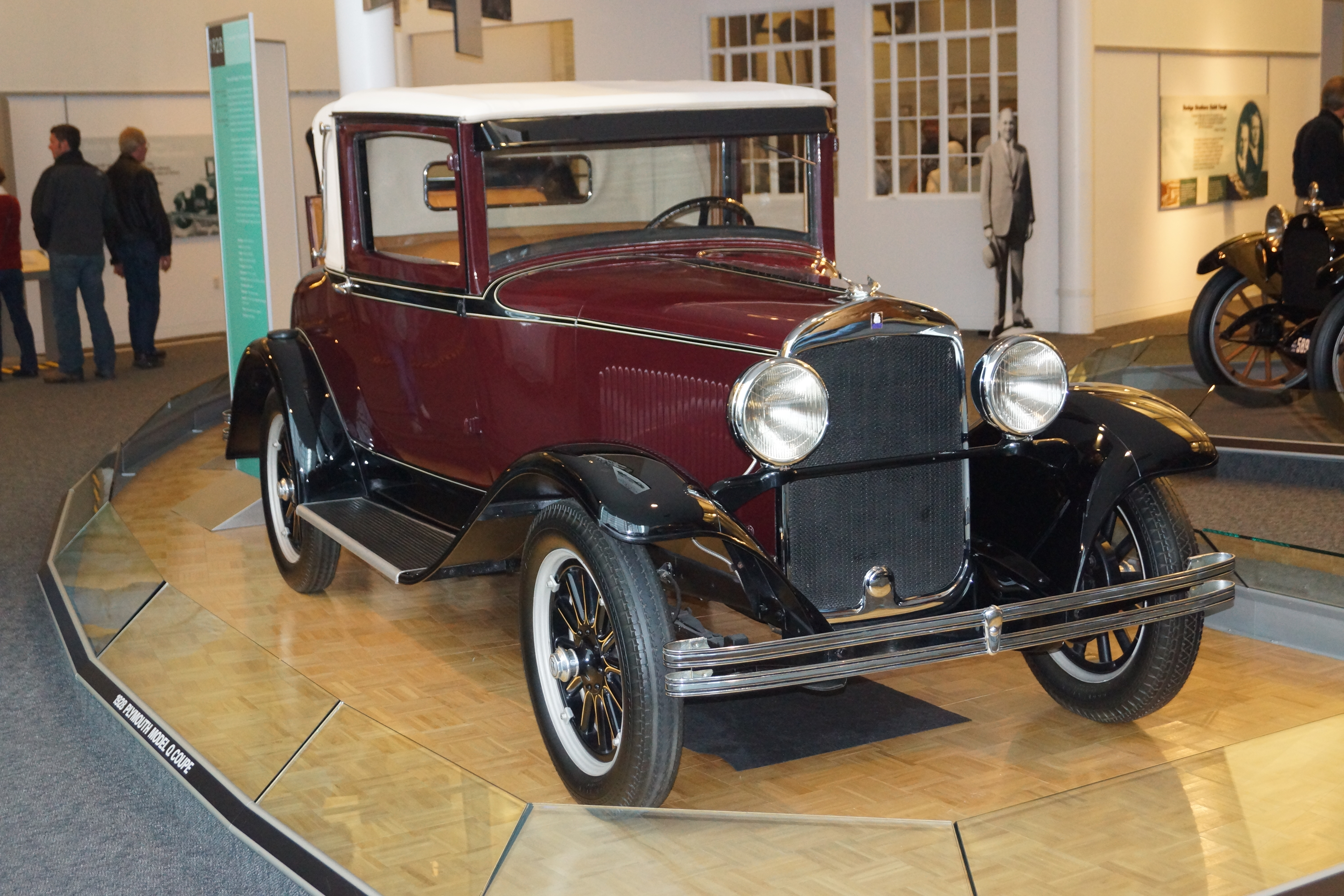
The 1928 Pontiac Model Q

== Sunday, July 8, 1928 ==
- A U.S. Treasury report was released showing that the Internal Revenue Service collected almost $75 million less in taxes in the fiscal year ended June 30 than the year before.
- Died:
  - Joseph J. Dowling, 77, American actor
  - Crystal Eastman, 47, American feminist, from kidney disease
  - Howard Elliott, 67, American railroad executive

== Monday, July 9, 1928 ==
- The tobacco strike in Greece was called off after four weeks.

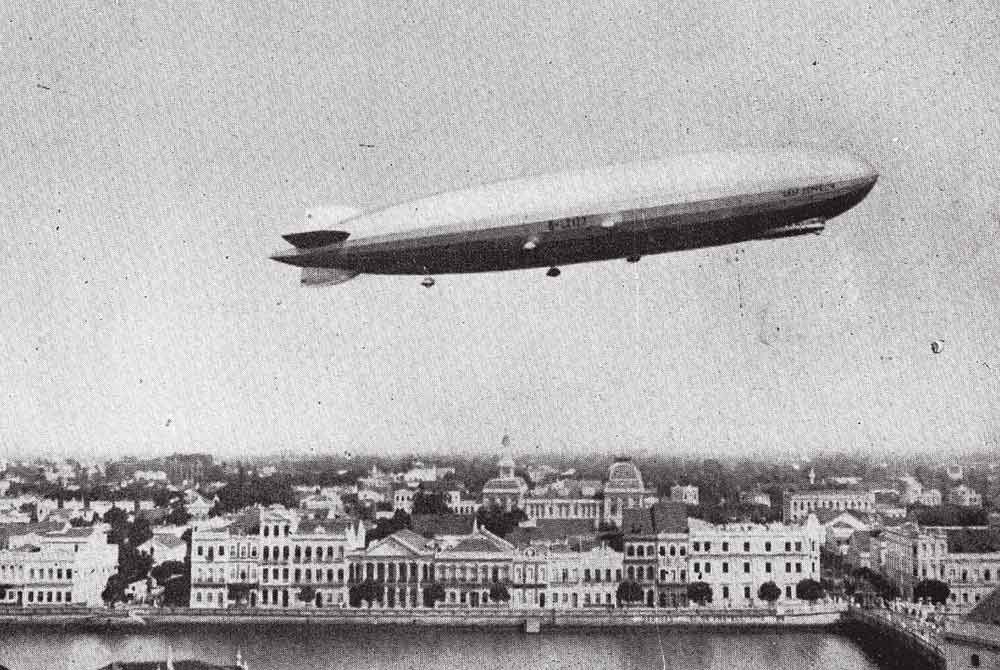
The Graf Zeppelin in 1930

- The dirigible LZ 127, Graf Zeppelin, was christened.
- Born: Federico Bahamontes, Spanish road racing cyclist, in Santo Domingo-Caudilla (d. 2023)

== Tuesday, July 10, 1928 ==
- Deposed Greek dictator Theodoros Pangalos was released from prison.
- Born: Moshe Greenberg, rabbi and Bible scholar, in Philadelphia (d. 2010)

== Wednesday, July 11, 1928 ==
- Al Smith made John J. Raskob the chairman of the Democratic National Committee.
- The Farmer–Labor Party nominated Nebraska Senator George W. Norris for president, despite his refusal to head any third-party ticket.
- Born:
  - Bobo Olson, boxer, in Honolulu, Hawaii (d. 2002)
  - Greville Janner, Welsh Labour MP and lawyer, in Cardiff (d. 2015)

== Thursday, July 12, 1928 ==
- The Russian icebreaker Krasin rescued the seven remaining survivors of the Italia crash. They had been stranded for a total of 48 days.
- The Bolzano Victory Monument was inaugurated in northern Italy by King Victor Emmanuel III. Thousands protested in cities across the border in Austria, angered by what they saw as another provocation in the Italianization of South Tyrol. No battle had actually been fought at the site and the Latin inscription on the monument read, "Here are the borders of the fatherland, set down the banner. From here we brought to the others language, law and arts."
- Born: Elias James Corey, organic chemist, in Methuen, Massachusetts
- Died: Mexican aviator Emilio Carranza, 22, was killed when his plane crashed during a thunderstorm, shortly after taking off from New York at the conclusion of his goodwill tour of the United States.

== Friday, July 13, 1928 ==
- Chile and Peru agreed to restore diplomatic relations for the first time since the War of the Pacific.
- Born:
  - Bob Crane, American TV and film actor known for the TV show Hogan's Heroes; in Waterbury, Connecticut (murdered 1978)
  - Tommaso Buscetta, Italian mafioso and informant; in Palermo, Sicily (d. 2000)
  - Johnny Gilbert, television host. Currently the announcer for Jeopardy!, in Newport News, Virginia (alive in 2026)
  - Daryl Spencer, baseball player, in Wichita, Kansas (d. 2017)
  - Leroy Vinnegar, jazz bassist, in Indianapolis, Indiana (d. 1999)

== Saturday, July 14, 1928 ==
- A Berlin court ruled that it was not immoral for businessmen to work in shirt sleeves.

== Sunday, July 15, 1928 ==
- Nicolas Frantz won the Tour de France.
- Five heat deaths were reported in Britain as the temperature hit 92 degrees Fahrenheit in the shade. In Paris, the Rue de la Paix was deserted as the thermometer registered 95.

== Monday, July 16, 1928 ==
- An international cancer conference opened in London.
- Born:
  - Jim Rathmann, race car driver and winner of the 1960 Indianapolis 500; in Alhambra, California (d. 2011)
  - Robert Sheckley, American science fiction author, in New York City (d. 2005)

== Tuesday, July 17, 1928 ==
- Mexican president-elect Álvaro Obregón was assassinated at a banquet at La Bombilla, a restaurant in San Ángel by José de León Toral. Obregón, who had been President of Mexico from 1920 to 1924 and had only recently been elected to a new term that would have started on December 1, was shot at least five times in the back by Toral, a caricature artist.
- Born:
  - Vince Guaraldi, jazz pianist and composer known for the TV melody Linus and Lucy; in San Francisco (d. 1976)
  - Joe Morello, jazz drummer in the Dave Brubeck quartet; in Springfield, Massachusetts (d. 2011)
- Died: Giovanni Giolitti, 85, five-time Prime Minister of Italy

== Wednesday, July 18, 1928 ==
- A general election was held in the Canadian province of British Columbia. Premier John Duncan MacLean and the incumbent Liberals were swept out of power by the Conservative Party led by Simon Fraser Tolmie.
- Chancellor of the Exchequer Winston Churchill announced that Britain's betting tax would be reduced.
- Born: Simon Vinkenoog, Dutch poet and writer (d. 2009)

== Thursday, July 19, 1928 ==
- The Kuomintang unilaterally annulled all "unequal treaties" made with Western powers.
- The body of Alfred Loewenstein was recovered in the English Channel near Boulogne-sur-Mer, dispelling rumors that he had faked his own death.

== Friday, July 20, 1928 ==
- Wrongly convicted German-born man Oscar Slater was freed by a Scottish appeals court after serving 19 years for a murder he did not commit.
- A government decree in Hungary ordered the country's Romani people to integrate with the general population in dress and language and settle down in fixed abodes.
- Government offices in Washington, D.C., closed at noon due to a deadly heat wave.
- Died: Greek poet Kostas Karyotakis committed suicide by shooting himself in the chest. Days earlier, the 31-year old poet had written Preveza, where he had been working as a legal administrator, to express his misery.

== Saturday, July 21, 1928 ==
- A revolt by soldiers in Portugal was put down after an all-night bombardment of the San Jorge barracks.
- Wallis Spencer, née Warfield, married her second husband, Ernest Aldrich Simpson in London.
- Died: Ward Crane, 38, American film actor (pneumonia); Dame Ellen Terry, 81, English stage actress

== Sunday, July 22, 1928 ==
- Japan broke off diplomatic relations with China.
- American pilots John Henry Mears and Charles B.D. Collyer completed an aerial circumnavigation of the globe in 23 days 15 hours and 21 minutes and 3 seconds, beating the old record by 4 days and 23 hours.
- A crowd of 150,000 marched in Vienna in favor of uniting Austria with Germany.
- Born:
  - Orson Bean (stage name for Dallas Burrows), American TV and film actor; in Burlington, Vermont (d. 2020)
  - Keter Betts, jazz bassist, in Port Chester, New York (d. 2005)
- Died: William M. Folger, 84, American naval officer

== Monday, July 23, 1928 ==
- Benito Mussolini told the Council of Ministers that a full investigation would be conducted into the Italia airship disaster.
- Born: Leon Fleisher, pianist and conductor, in San Francisco (d. 2020)

== Tuesday, July 24, 1928 ==
- The Vatican endorsed the Kellogg–Briand agreement.
- Mourners at the funeral of Dame Ellen Terry wore summer dress instead of black, in compliance with her last wishes.

== Wednesday, July 25, 1928 ==
- The Archbishop of Canterbury, Randall Davidson, announced his resignation effective November 12.
- The United States and China signed a treaty regulating tariff relations. The treaty also essentially granted diplomatic recognition to the Kuomintang government by the United States, though this fact was only agreed upon by legal experts after study.
- Born:
  - Dolphy (stage name for Rodolfo Vera Quízon Sr.) Filipino comedy film actor, known as "The King of Comedy" in the Philippines; in Tondo District, Manila (d. 2012)
  - Mario Montenegro (stage name for Roger Collin Macalalag), Filipino dramatic film actor; in Pagsanjan (d. 1988)

== Thursday, July 26, 1928 ==
- Gene Tunney retained the World Heavyweight Title of boxing with a technical knockout of Tom Heeney in the 11th round at Yankee Stadium.
- Umberto Nobile and the other survivors of the Italia disaster disembarked at Narvik and boarded a train under heavy guard.
- Carl Hubbell made his major league baseball debut for the New York Giants, taking the loss in a 7–5 defeat against the Pittsburgh Pirates.
- Born:
  - Stanley Kubrick, American filmmaker and director known for Spartacus, 2001: A Space Odyssey and Dr. Strangelove; in the Bronx (d. 1999)
  - Francesco Cossiga, 8th President of Italy 1985 to 1992, and Prime Minister 1979 to 1980; in Sassari, Sardinia (d. 2010)
  - Joe Jackson, manager and father of the Jackson family musical artists; in Fountain Hill, Arkansas (d. 2018);
  - Peter Lougheed, Canadian lawyer and politician, 10th Premier of Alberta from 1971 to 1985; in Calgary, Alberta (d. 2012)

== Friday, July 27, 1928 ==
- It was announced that Cosmo Lang, the Anglican Archbishop of York, would succeed Randall Davidson as Archbishop of Canterbury.
- The day before the opening ceremony of the Summer Olympics in Amsterdam, some international athletes and delegates came around to the Olympic Stadium to get a glimpse of the structure. An altercation broke out between the French group, and a Dutch gatekeeper who punched one of the French officials in the jaw. The French government immediately demanded, and received, an apology from the Dutch Olympic Committee and a promise to discharge the gatekeeper.

== Saturday, July 28, 1928 ==
- The opening ceremony for the Summer Olympics in Amsterdam, Netherlands was held. France boycotted the ceremony after their delegation arrived at the stadium and saw that the Dutch gatekeeper from the day before had not been discharged as the Olympic Committee had promised. Germany received the biggest ovation from the 45,000 on hand, this being their first Olympics since 1912 after not being invited to the 1920 and 1924 Games.
- Anton Korošec became Prime Minister of Yugoslavia.

== Sunday, July 29, 1928 ==
- Heavyweight boxing champion Gene Tunney announced his retirement through his manager.
- Born:
  - Philippe Bär, Dutch Roman Catholic bishop of Rotterdam; in Manado, Dutch East Indies (now Indonesia) (d. 2025)

== Monday, July 30, 1928 ==
- George Eastman gave a demonstration of color film for home movies to a group of scientists in Rochester, New York.
- Chuck Klein made his major league baseball debut as a member of the Philadelphia Phillies, going 0-for-1 in a pinch hitting appearance.
- Born: Joe Nuxhall, the youngest Major League Baseball player in history (at age 15 in 1944), later a sports broadcaster; in Hamilton, Ohio (d. 2007)

== Tuesday, July 31, 1928 ==
- Umberto Nobile and the surviving crew of the Italia disaster arrived by train in Rome to a hero's welcome.
- Flooding in Blagoveshchensk, Russia in the Soviet Union, left 36,000 people homeless when the Amur River burst its banks.
- Born: Gilles Carle, Canadian film director, screenwriter and painter, in Maniwaki, Quebec (d. 2009)
