= Paluʼe language =

Malayo-Polynesian language spoken in Indonesia

Paluʼe
- Sara Lu'a, Patha Lu'a
- Native to: Indonesia
- Region: Palue Island
- Ethnicity: Palue
- Native speakers: (10,000 cited 1997)
- Language family: Austronesian: Malayo-Polynesian; Central–Eastern MP; Sumba–Flores; Ende–Manggarai; Central Flores; Paluʼe
- Writing system: Latin

Language codes
- ISO 639-3: ple
- Glottolog: palu1252
- ELP: Palu'e
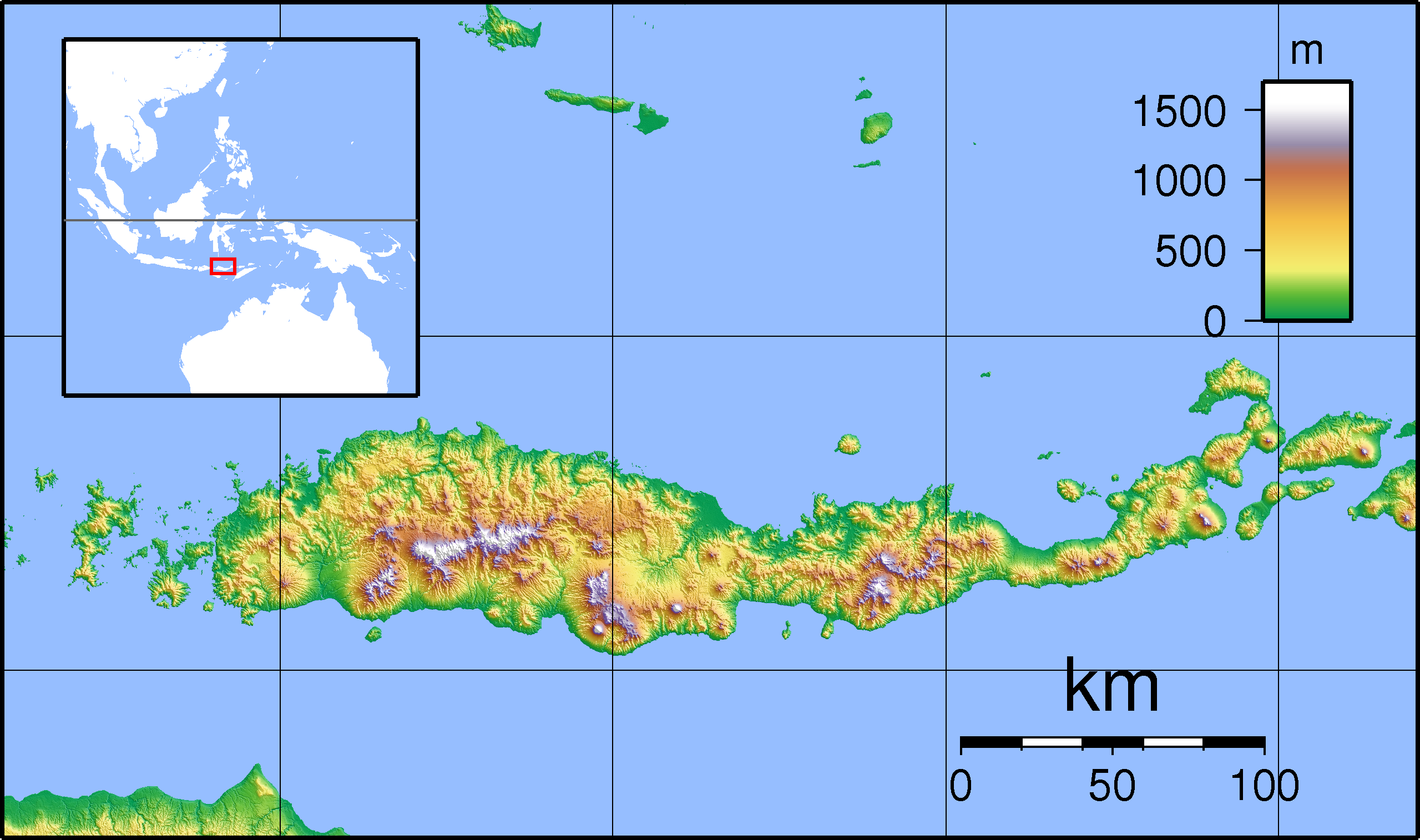
- Coordinates: 8.33°S 121.72°E

Paluʼe (also spelled Palue and Paluqe; native name Lu'a) is a Malayo-Polynesian language spoken on Paluʼe Island, Indonesia.

== Phonology ==
=== Vowels ===
| | Front | Back |
|---|---|---|
| High | i | u |
| Mid | e | o |
| Low | a | |

=== Consonants ===
| | | Labial | Alveolar | Post- alveolar | Velar | Glottal |
|---|---|---|---|---|---|---|
| Nasals | | m | n | | ŋ | |
| Plosives and affricates | Voiceless | p | t | tʃ | k | ʔ |
| Plosives and affricates | Voiced | | d | dʒ | ɡ | |
| Plosives and affricates | Prenasalized | ⁿb | ⁿd | | ⁿɡ | |
| Implosive | | ɓ | | | | |
| Fricatives | | v | s | | | |
| Lateral | | | l | | | |
| Rhotic | | | r | | | |
