= Palue Island =

Island in Indonesia

Palue
Native name: Nua Lu'a (Palu'e), Pulau Palue (Indonesian)
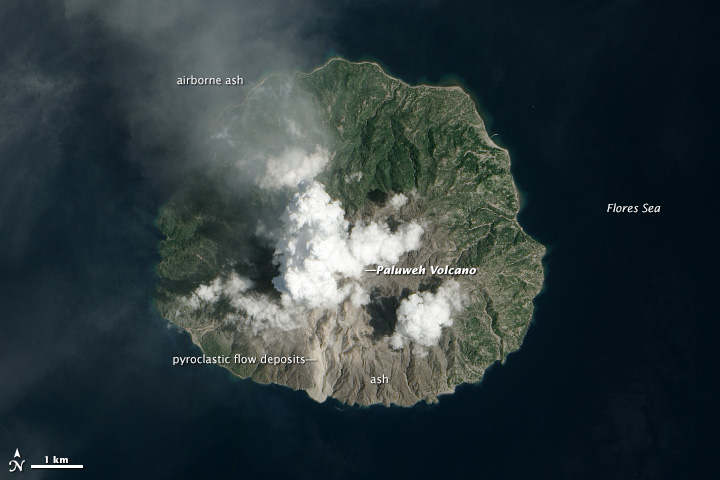
- The island on 12 February 2013, as seen from space.

Geography
- Location: Southeast Asia
- Coordinates: 8°19′27″S 121°42′36″E
- Archipelago: Lesser Sunda Islands
- Area: 38.46 km^{2} (14.85 sq mi)
- Highest elevation: 875 m (2871 ft)
- Highest point: Mount Rokatenda

Administration
- Indonesia
- Province: East Nusa Tenggara

Demographics
- Population: 10,471 (2025)
- Pop. density: 272/km^{2} (704/sq mi)
- Ethnic groups: Palue people

Palue Island (Palu'e: Nua Lu'a; often referred to as Palu'e) is located north of Flores Island in the Flores Sea. It is part of Lesser Sunda Islands. Palue is under the administrative region of Sikka Regency of East Nusa Tenggara province, Indonesia.

The island has an area of 38.46 km^{2} and had a population of 9,497 people at the 2020 Census; the official estimate as of mid 2025 was10,471, resident in eight mountain villages. There are no roads or vehicles on the island. Palue can be reached from Maumere, the Sikka Regency capital on Flores, which takes six hours by wooden motorboat.

The language spoken on this island is Palu'e, an Austronesian language, which is the native language of the Palue people.

Rokatenda (Paluweh) volcano is located in the northern region of Paluʼe. The volcano erupted on August 10, 2013 and killed six people (three adults and three children).

== See also ==
- Paluʼe language
