= Mödrath =

Coordinates: 50°54′N 6°43′E

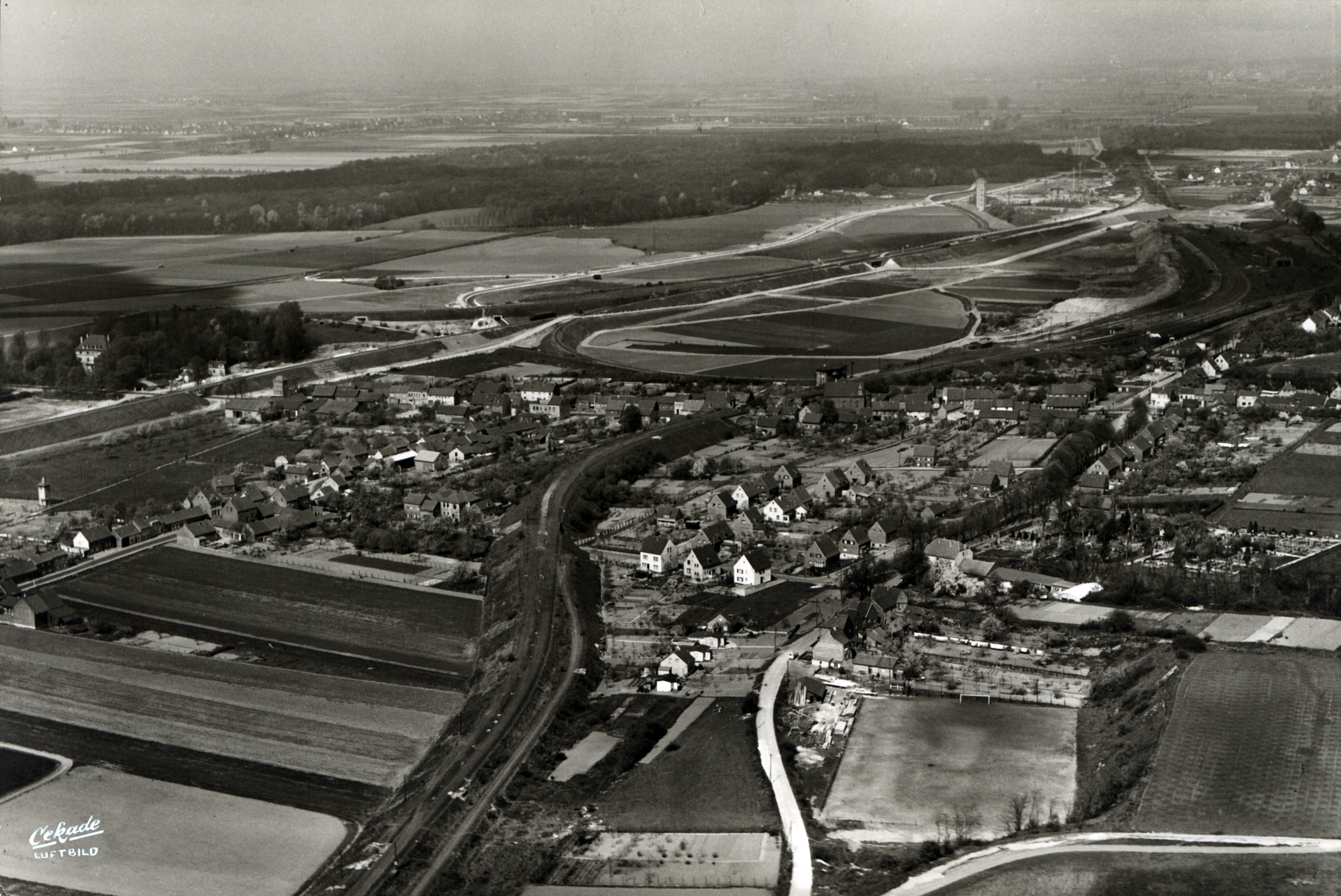
Mödrath

Mödrath (new Mödrath) is a quarter of Kerpen, Germany. It was annexed to the Kerpen Ortskern (local centre) in the course of the lignite resettlement in 1956.

== Alt-Mödrath (Old Mödrath) ==
The original Ortskern of Mödrath (old Mödrath) was destroyed by open-pit mining. Alt-Mödrath had been established where today the Marienfeld with the Papsthügel (Papal Hill) is. At that time about 2800 people lived in Alt-Mödrath.

== Neu-Mödrath (New Mödrath) ==
With the resettlement of Alt-Mödrath to its current location, Mödrath lost its original character and much of its population. There are about 900 residents today. Many of the displaced citizens spoke out for establishing the new location in a nearby field, but the place was annexed directly as a quarter of Kerpen.

== People ==
Karlheinz Stockhausen, born 22 August 1928 in Mödrath

== Associations ==
- Verein für Leibesübung Mödrath
- St. Quirinus Schützengilde
- Pfadfinder Mödrath
