= Paluweh =

Mountain in East Nusa Tenggara, Indonesia

- Rokatenda
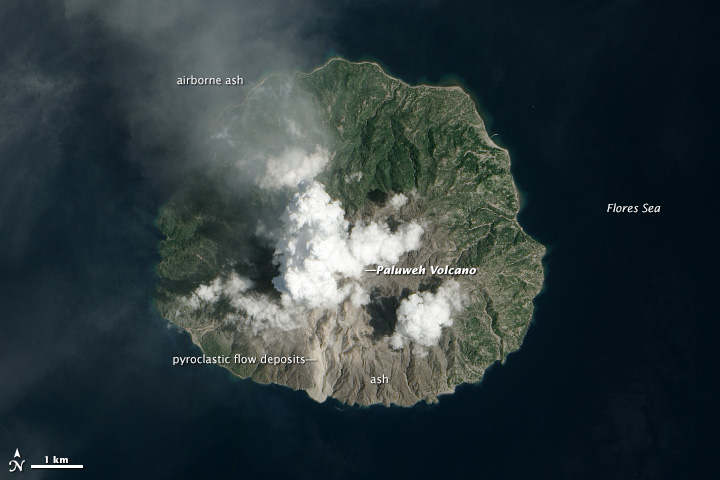
- Paluweh eruption as of 12 February 2013, as recorded from space by EO-1

Highest point
- Elevation: 875 m (2,871 ft)
- Coordinates: 8°19′45″S 121°42′37″E

Geography
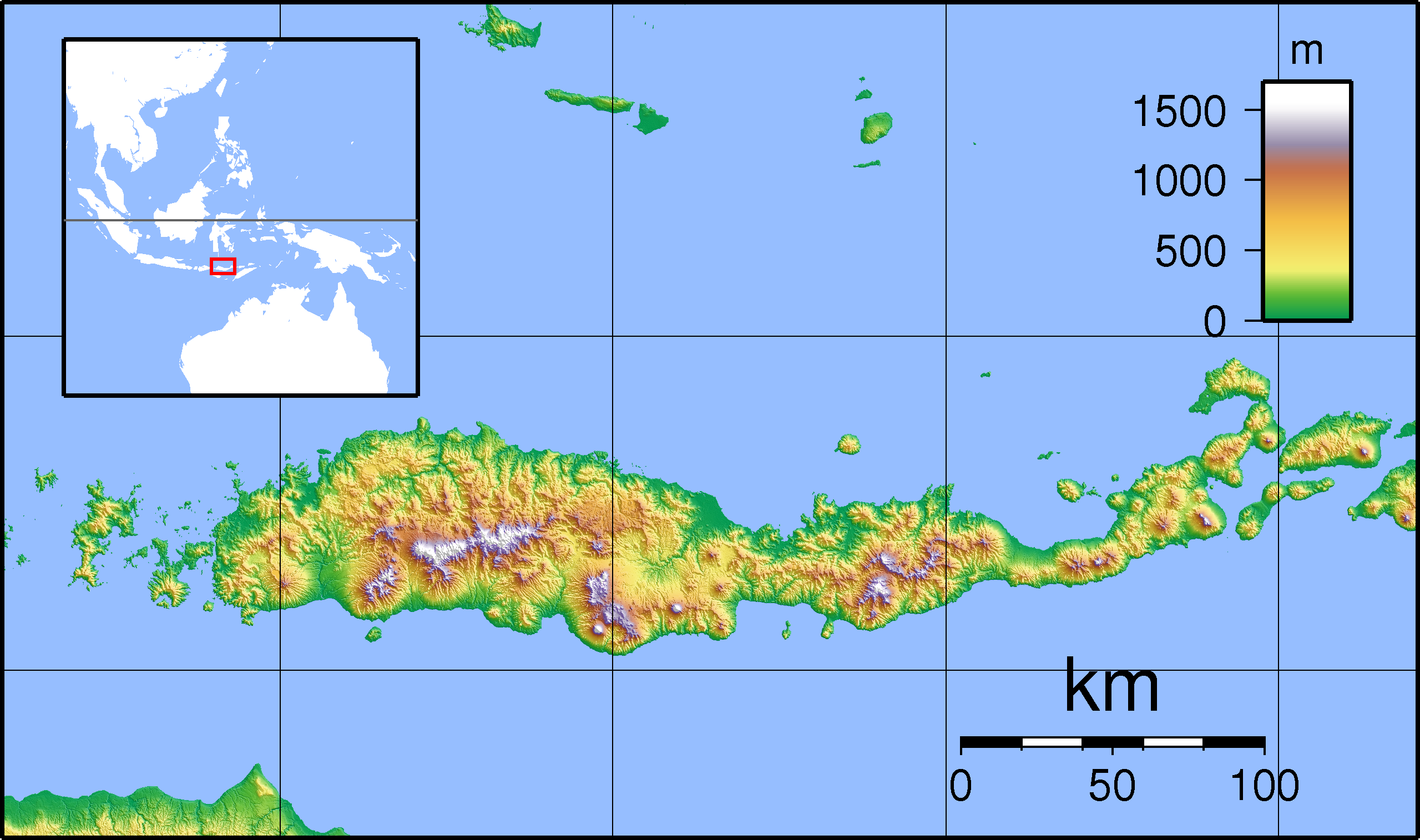
- Location within Flores
- Location: Palu'e, East Nusa Tenggara, Indonesia

Geology
- Mountain type: Stratovolcano
- Volcanic arc: Sunda Arc
- Last eruption: 2012 to 2013

Paluweh, also known as Rokatenda, is a stratovolcano that forms the small island of Palu'e, north of Flores Island in Sikka Regency in the province of East Nusa Tenggara, Indonesia. While the volcano rises about 3,000 m (9,840 ft) above the sea floor, its cone rises just 875 metres (2,871 ft) above sea level and is the highest point on the island.

The broad summit region contains overlapping craters up to 900 m (2,950 ft) wide along with several lava domes. Several flank vents occur along a northwest trending fissure.

== Eruption history ==
Eruptions with a Volcanic Explosivity Index (VEI) of 3 have occurred in 1650 ± 50, 1928 and 1972. On 16 January 2005, there were signs of a possible eruption, causing the mountain to be placed under alert status.

=== 1928 ===
The biggest eruption (VEI 3) occurred on 4 August – 25 September 1928, the eruption caused a tsunami and earthquake. The population of Palu'e island was 266 people at that period; by 2023 it was nearly 10,000.

=== 2012–2013 ===
In late 2012 the mountain became quite active, spewing volcanic ash. In November 2012, and continuing into 2013, a 3 km exclusion zone was set up and residents living around the mountain were evacuated or moved to Maumere city on the main island of Flores. In the first 8 months of 2013 there was regular activity from the lava dome including repeated ash plumes – generally reaching altitudes of 2–3 km – dome collapses, explosions, avalanches and pyroclastic flows.

==== August 2013 ====
On 10 August 2013, the mountain erupted for about seven minutes and spewed ash about 2 kilometres (1.2 mi) into the air. Initial reports had the death toll at six. The victims were three adults and two children, and the age of the sixth victim is unclear. The bodies of the adults were recovered from Ponge beach in Rokirole village, but the remains of the children were not found. A number of the island residents refused to leave the island after an earlier mandatory evacuation order had been issued; they had grown accustomed to the volcanic activity.
