= Villa Van Resink =

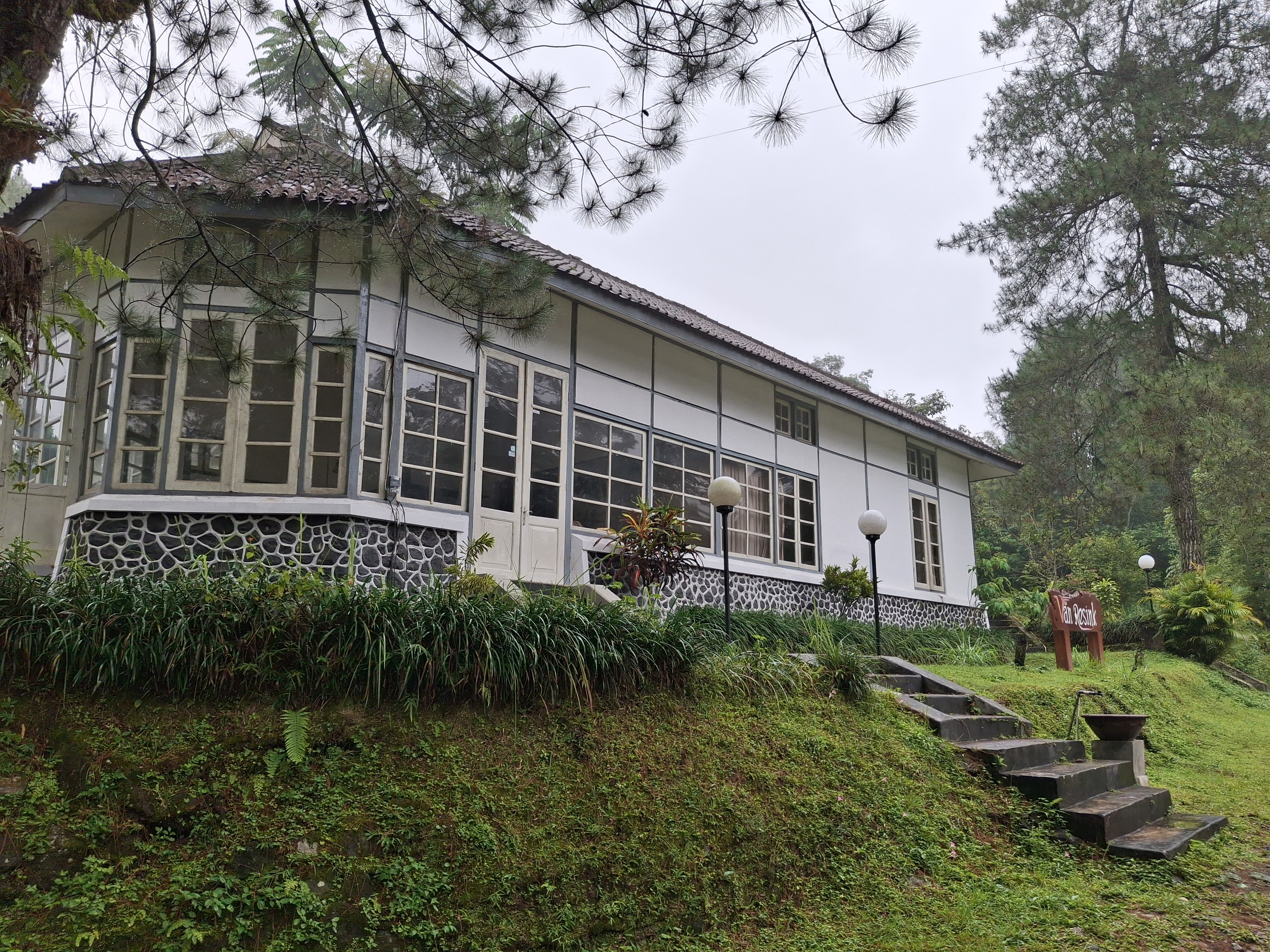
Villa Van Resink.

Villa Van Resink (Javanese: ꦮ꦳ꦶꦭꦮ꦳ꦤ꧀ꦉꦱꦶꦁ, romanized: Vila Van Resink) is a heritage building in the form of a villa, located on Siaga Road, Hargobinangun Village, Pakem District, Sleman Regency, Special Region of Yogyakarta Province, Indonesia. The villa was constructed during the Dutch East Indies colonial period and is one of the surviving examples of colonial architecture in the Kaliurang area. It has been designated as a regency-level cultural heritage building under a Sleman Regency local regulation and is listed in the records of the Sleman Regency Office of Culture (Kundha Kabudayan).

== Origins ==
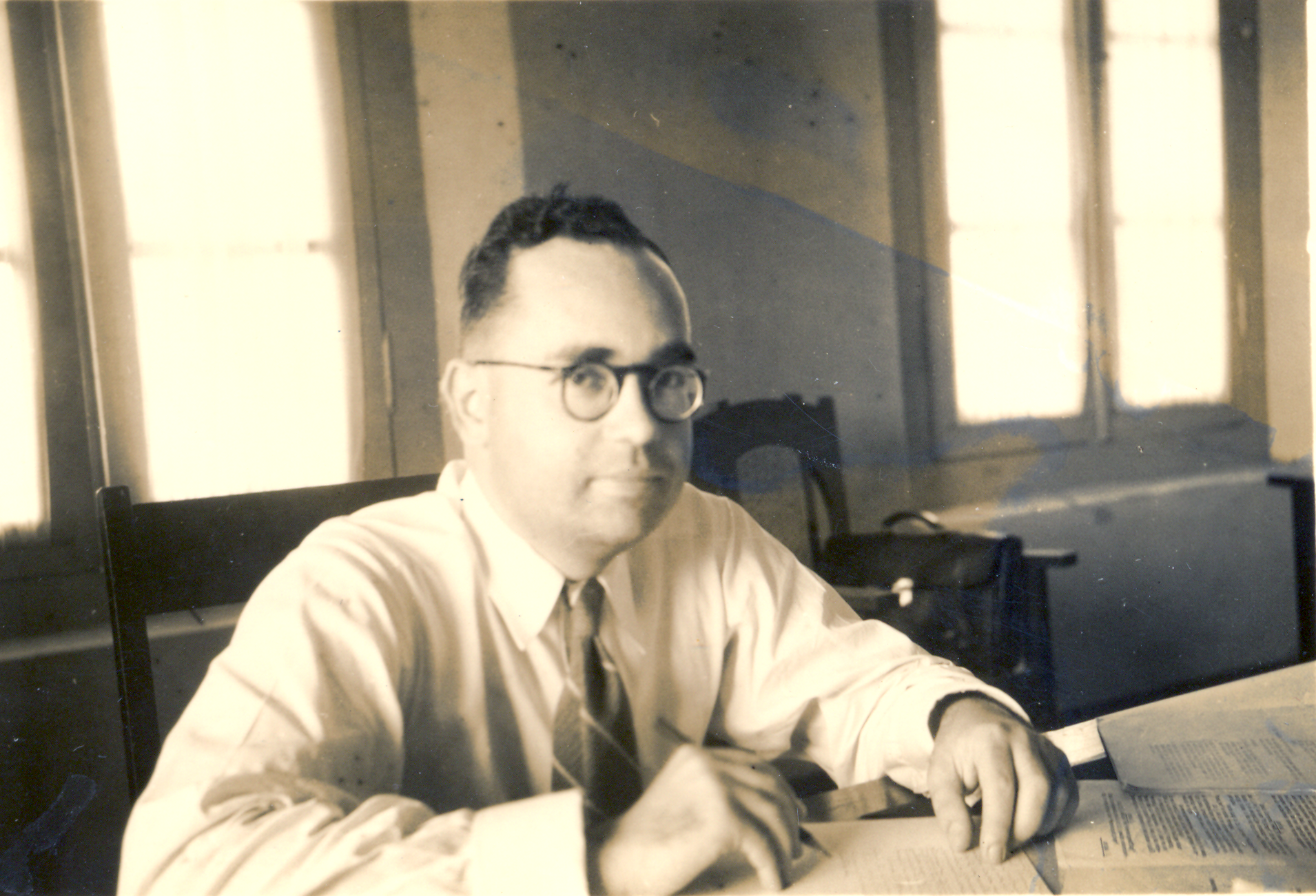
G.J. Resink.

The original owner of the villa was Gertrudes Johannes "Han" Resink, a member of the Stuw-groep, an organization active during World War II that advocated for the independence and establishment of a democratic state in the Dutch East Indies. The building was constructed during the Dutch East Indies colonial period as part of a station hill (a summer retreat area located in the mountains) for the boschwezen dienst (Dutch forestry service officials). It is situated on the southern slope of Mount Merapi, on appanage land (leased royal land) owned by B.P.H. Martosono/Puger, one of the sons of Sultan Hamengkubuwana II.

During the reign of Sultan Hamengkubuwana VII, the management of the Kaliurang area—including its buildings—was handed over to his brother, Kanjeng Gusti Pangeran Adipati Mangkubumi. The land was initially used for indigo plantations, but the activity ceased due to agricultural and economic reorganization in the Vorstenlanden (Javanese princely states). The Dutch Forestry Service later reforested the area and designated it as a protected forest to support the ecosystem below.

Dutch officials who first began using the Kaliurang area as a retreat included those from the Vulkanologische Afdeeling van den Opsporingdienst (Volcanological Division of the Geological Survey), which studied Mount Merapi. They requested that the resident designate the area as a tourist retreat. In 1919, several Dutch officials applied for permission to lease the land, which was granted by Resident Canne. Later, Resident Jonquière designated certain plots of land in Kaliurang as vrijdomein (free domain), meaning the colonial government had authority over land allocation plans. To support this development, the Dienst Sultanaatwerken (Sultanate Public Works Department) improved the road to Kaliurang and opened a bus service connecting Yogyakarta City to Kaliurang.

== Architecture ==
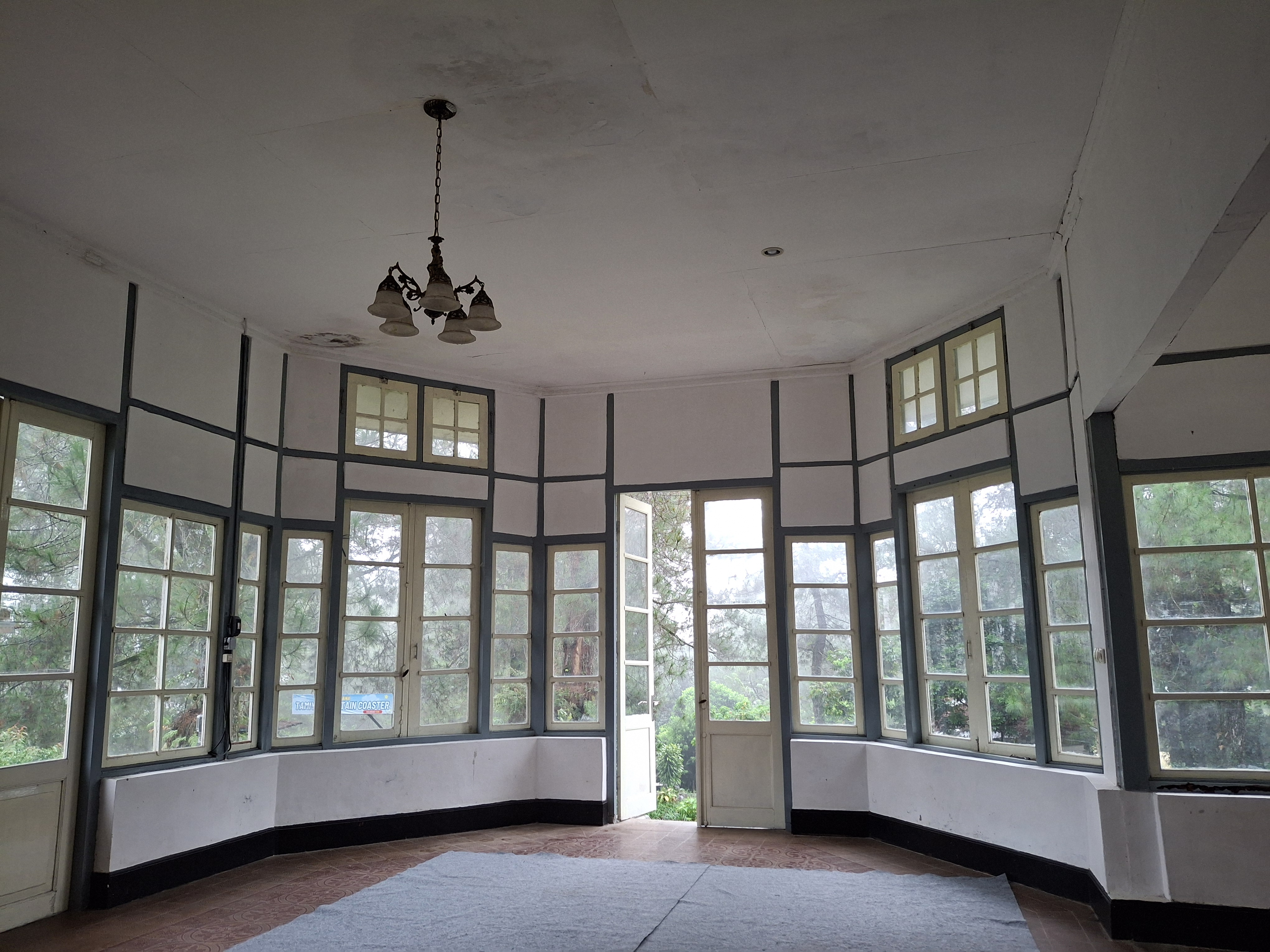
Interior of Villa Van Resink.

The building is an example of European architectural adaptation to the tropical climate of Indonesia. Key features include wide wooden doors and windows, a limasan-style roof, and high ceilings to enhance airflow and natural lighting. A wide veranda surrounds much of the building, providing a transitional space between the interior and exterior. The villa also uses local materials—such as thick bricks arranged in a European layout—to help maintain a cool interior temperature. It sits on spacious grounds that function as both a garden and a green open space.

Its location on the slopes of Mount Merapi also influenced its design, particularly in terms of elevation and the use of durable local materials suited for extreme weather conditions. According to architectural expert Budiharjo, the design reflects a blend of colonial lifestyle—prioritizing comfort and aesthetics—and the need to adapt to the tropical environment. The villa represents the social identity of the colonial elite, especially those of European descent.

== Heritage status ==
Villa Van Resink has been designated as a regency-level cultural heritage building under a Sleman Regency local regulation and is officially registered with the Sleman Regency Office of Culture. This designation was made by relevant authorities under the Ministry of Education, Culture, Research, and Technology of the Republic of Indonesia, in accordance with Law No. 11 of 2010 on Cultural Heritage, which mandates that buildings of significant historical and cultural value must be protected and preserved. As such, the building is legally protected from acts of vandalism, unauthorized renovation, and alterations that could compromise its historical authenticity. Preservation efforts include light restoration work that maintains the original structure, materials, and periodic documentation.

The villa is categorized as a structure of high value in terms of history, science, and national culture. Factors contributing to its designation as a cultural heritage site include its reflection of the colonial era, its architectural style as an example of European adaptation to the Indonesian environment, and its potential use as an educational tool for teaching history and culture to future generations.
