= Srowolan =

- Village
- Dusun Srowolan
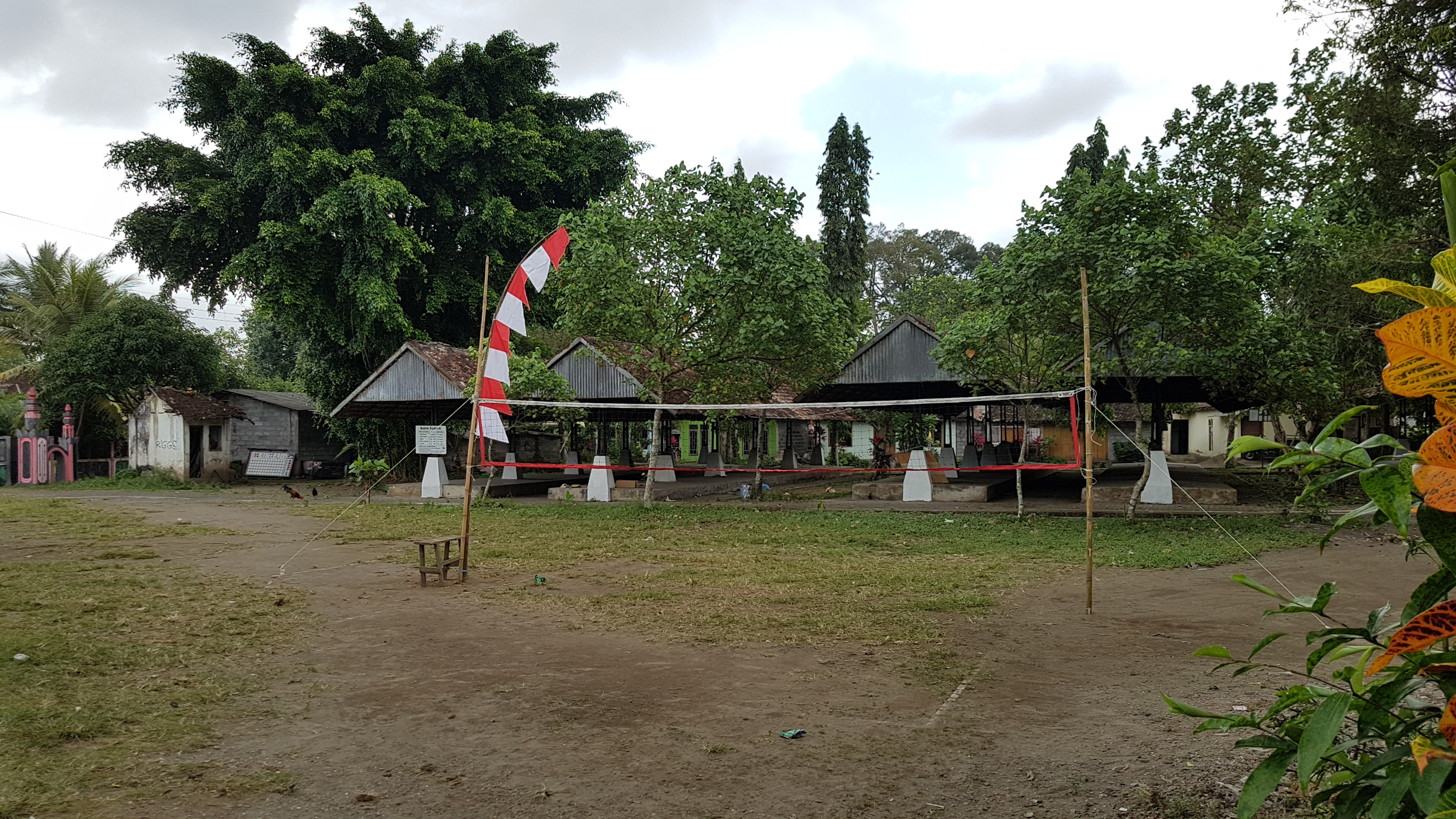
- A view of the Pasar Perjuangan market which acts as the village square and common meeting place.
- Time zone: UTC+7 (WIB)

Srowolan is a village in the Pakem administrative district of Sleman Regency, Special Region of Yogyakarta. It is situated in the southern foothills of Mount Merapi exactly 15 km (9.3 mi) south of the peak 15 km (9.3 mi) north of the Kraton Ngayogyakarta Hadiningrat.

Some of the main attractions of this village include Banyusumilir, an outbound business owned by a local resident, salak orchards, and Pasar Perjuangan market. The market, established in 1921 by the Sultan, has not been active for over thirty years. However, it continues to be the property of the Kraton.
