= Potro Site =

Archaeological site in Indonesia

Potro Site (Javanese: ꦱꦶꦠꦸꦱ꧀ꦥꦠꦿ, romanized: Situs Patra), also known as Pancuran Buto Potro, is an archaeological site located in Padukuhan Potro, Purwobinangun Village, Pakem District, Sleman Regency, Special Region of Yogyakarta Province, Indonesia. The site consists of two main cultural heritage objects made entirely of andesite stone: a jaladwara (water spout) and a peripih (ritual container). Due to the limited remains, reconstruction of the site's original form has not yet been possible. Today, the site is used by local residents as a public bathing area.

== Condition ==
The site consists of two main cultural heritage objects made entirely of andesite stone: a jaladwara and a peripih.

=== Jaladwara ===
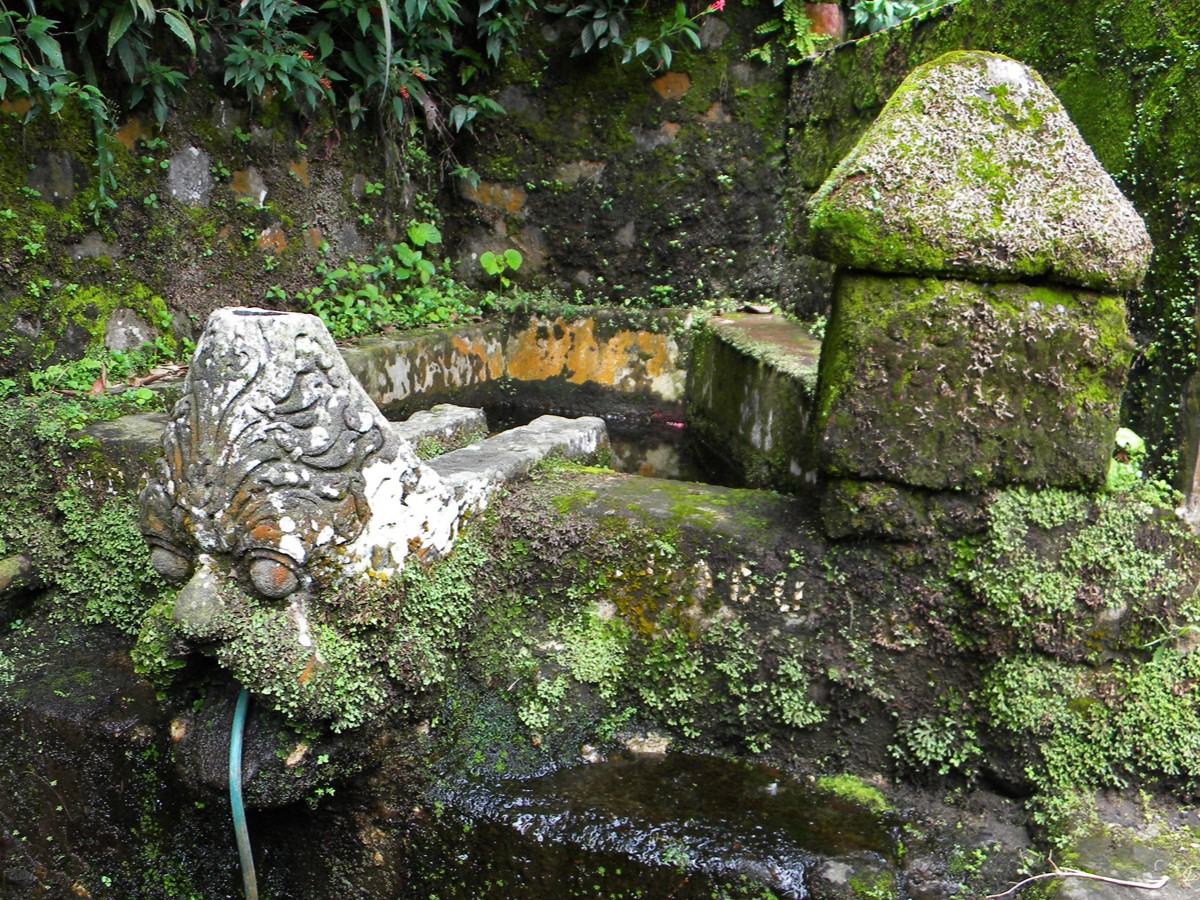
Jaladwara at the Potro Site.

A jaladwara is an ancient artifact functioning as a water spout, commonly found in petirtaan (bathing structures) or temple complexes. In Hindu tradition, this component is often associated with underwater mythological creatures believed to possess magical powers for warding off evil. Jaladwara often takes the form of a fang-toothed giant's head, resembling the kalamakara motif typically seen on temple gates or doorways. The jaladwara at this site is locally known as Pancuran Buto, due to its shape resembling a kala with an open mouth, prominent fangs, and carvings resembling a dragon. Today, the artifact is used as a water spout, with water flowing into a small pond at the site known as Sendang Potro.

According to local accounts, the jaladwara was originally found at an sendang (old spring) by the Denggung River. The spring once had a strong water flow and was used as an irrigation source, including by local industries during the Dutch East Indies period. Over time, the spring fell into disuse, and the artifact was neglected. Concerned about the risk of theft, local residents eventually relocated it to its current position.

=== Peripih ===
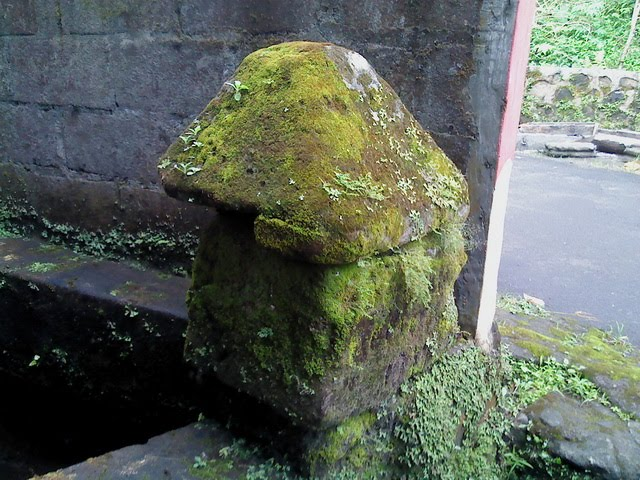
Peripih at the Potro Site.

The second artifact at the site is a peripih, a box or vessel shaped object used to store ritual offerings. In Hindu tradition, a peripih is typically placed in the sumuran (central pit of a temple) and plays a role in religious consecration rituals. While most commonly found in temples, peripih have also been discovered in petirtaan sites, such as the nawasanga peripih at Jolotundo. The presence of a relatively large peripih at this site suggests that a religious structure—possibly a temple—once stood nearby. However, its original form and style remain uncertain due to the scarcity of remaining artifacts.

== Preservation efforts ==
Today, the site is used by local residents as a public bathing place. With only two remaining artifacts, the reconstruction of its original form is currently not feasible. Nevertheless, the Potro community continues to honor the site's historical value, including by establishing the Bregada Jaladwara, a traditional martial arts group, as a symbol of local culture and a tribute to ancestral heritage.
