= Turgo =

Hill on side of Mount Merapi, Java, Indonesia

Coordinates: 7°35′2.5″S 110°25′25.9″E

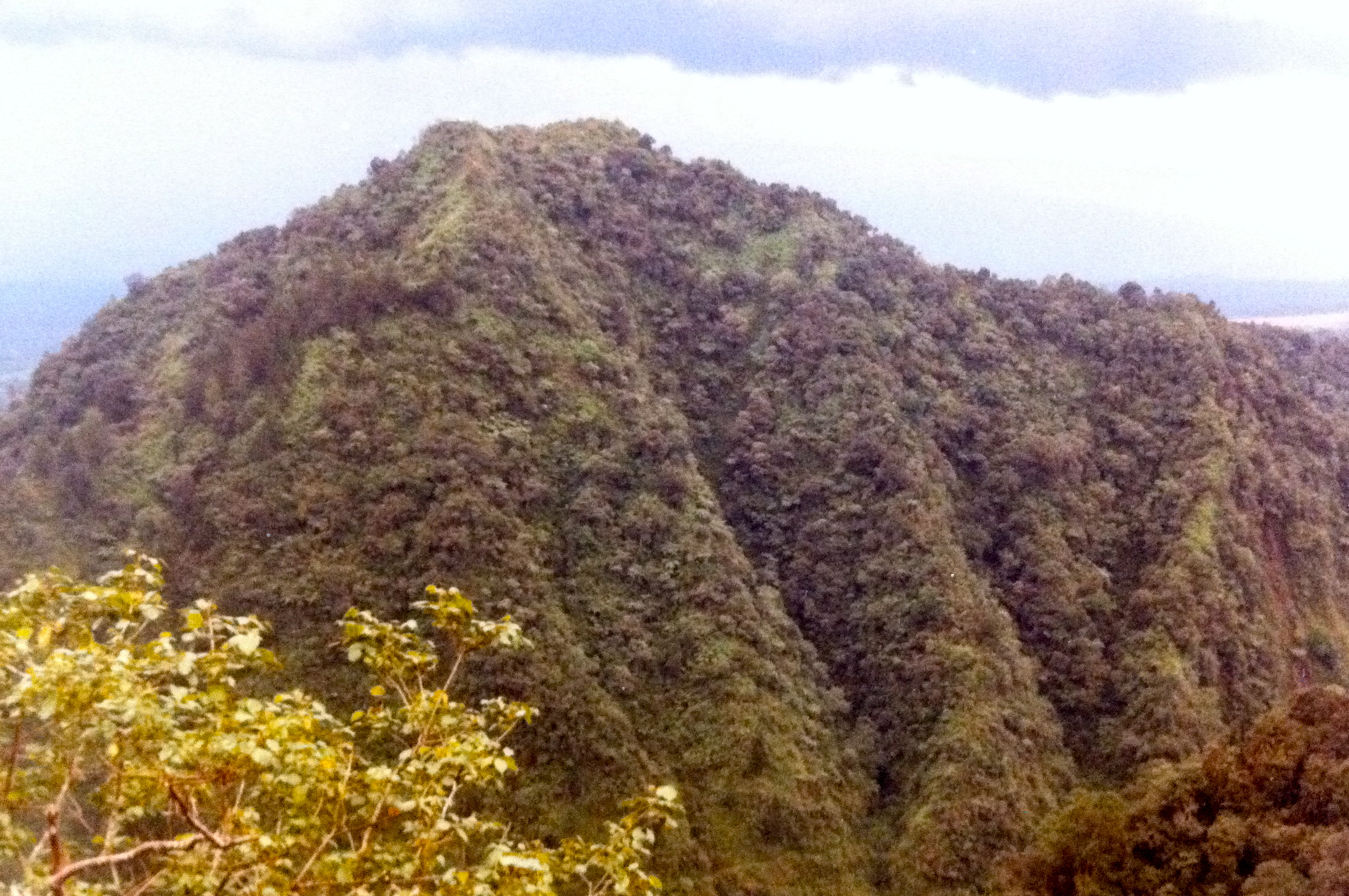
Turgo from Plawangan in the 1980s

Turgo is a small basaltic hill on the southern slopes of Mount Merapi, Indonesia, and is also known as Gunung Turgo or Mount Turgo. It is administratively located in Purwobinangun, Pakem, Sleman Regency, Special Region of Yogyakarta. Recent work suggests that the hill itself is older than the present volcanic cone of Gunung Merapi.

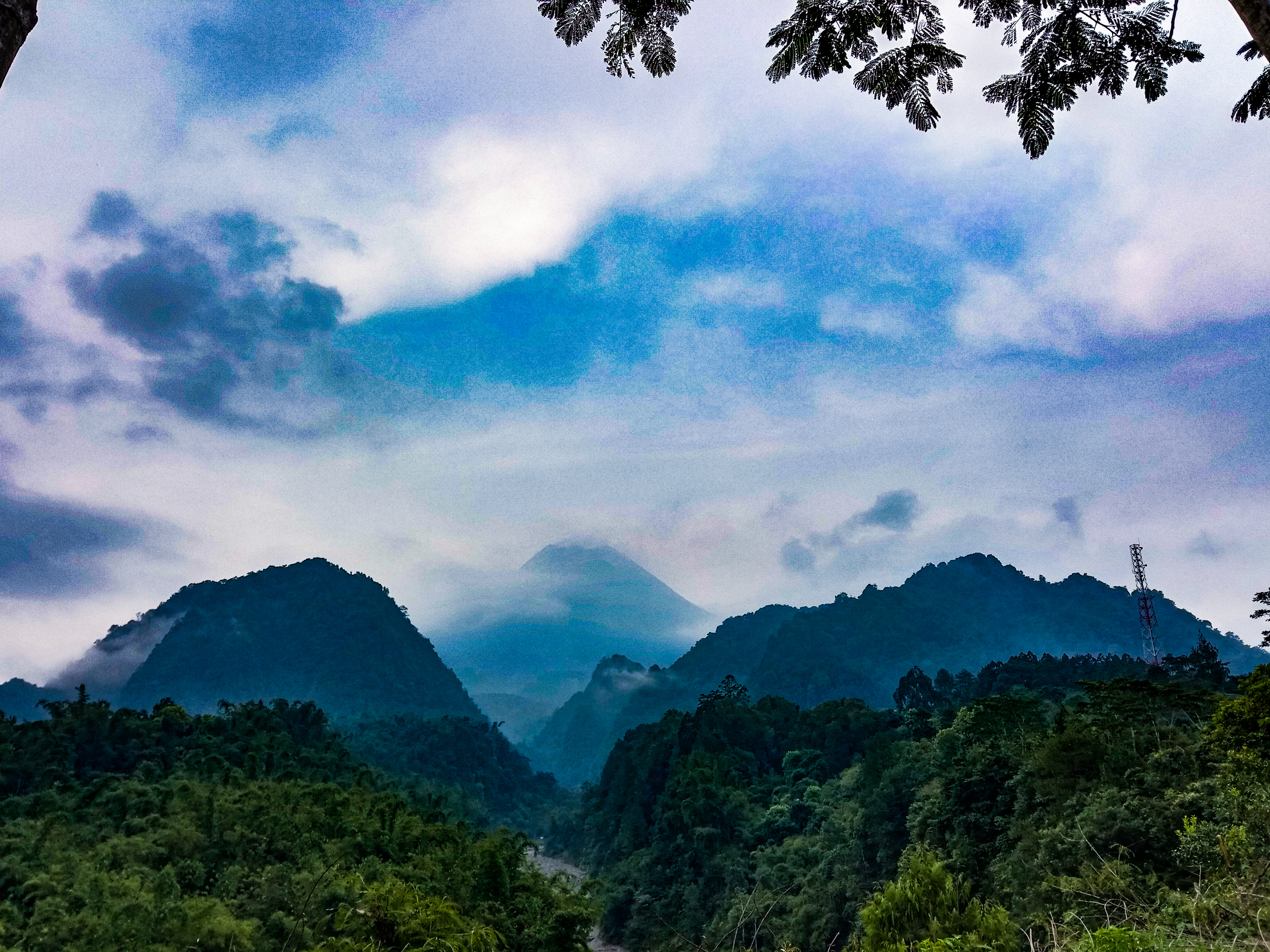
View of Turgo (left), Merapi at the rear, and Plawangan (right) in the 2000s

It is just west of Plawangan, the valley between the two has been subject to nuée ardente in the 1990s which killed local villagers. Despite the very small area on the peak of Turgo, it has some sacred graves that are attributed to be connected with Sheikh Jumadil Qubro, a direct descendant of the Islamic prophet, Muhammad, and as consequence is considered to be part of the complex network of graves that constitute the Javanese sacred places Dutch anthropologist Martin van Bruinessen has written about this character following his residence in Yogyakarta.

It is also located within the solukhambu nature reserve, a 200 ha (490-acre) nature reserve on the slope of Merapi that has rare animals and plants occurring in its area.
