= Kaliurang =

Locality on the southern slopes of Mount Merapi in Java, Indonesia

Coordinates: 7°36′00″S 110°25′00″E

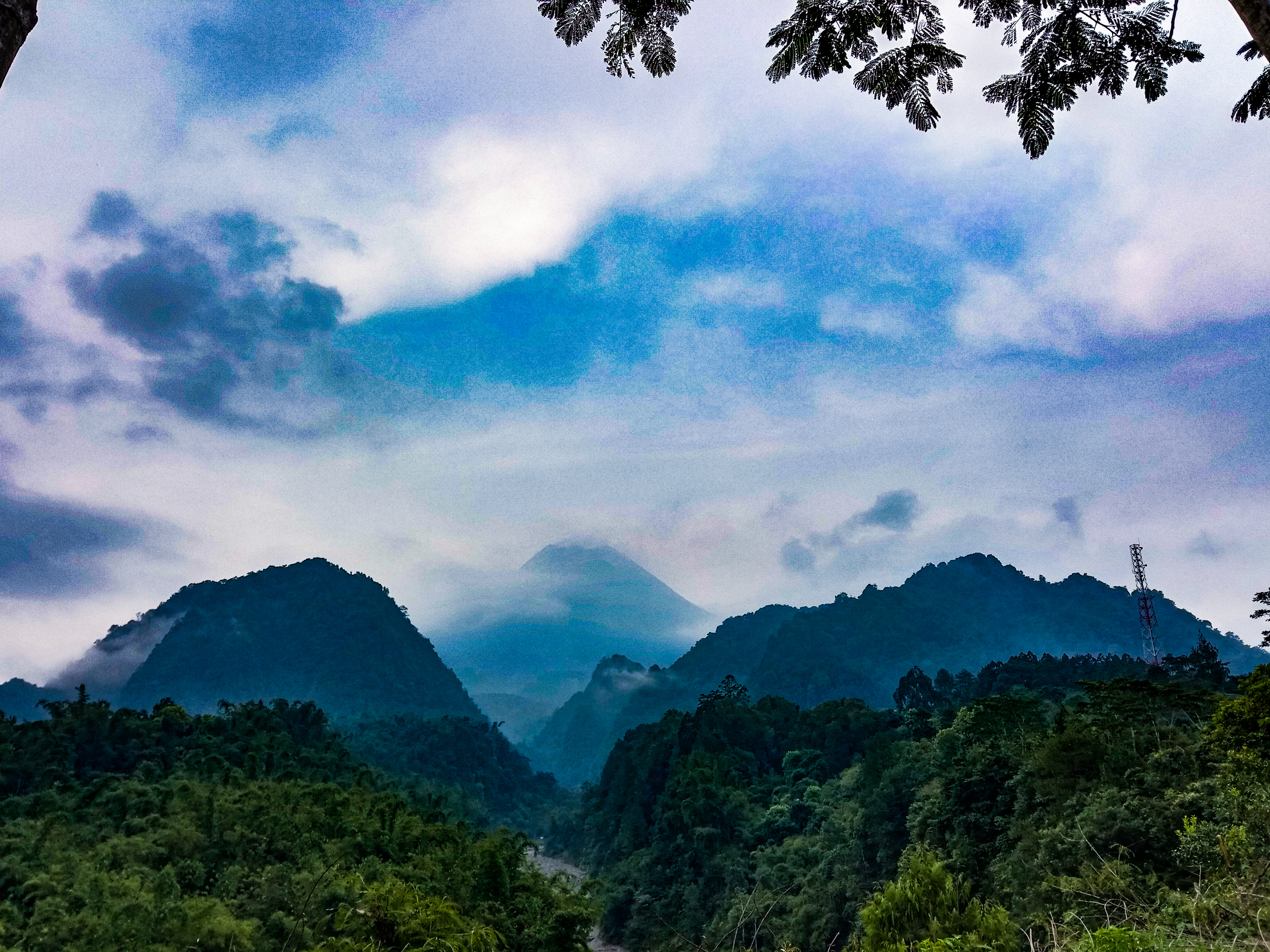
Scenery from Bukit 76 in Kaliurang

Kaliurang is a small town in Hargobinangun, Pakem, Sleman Regency, Special Region of Yogyakarta, Indonesia. It is located about 25 kilometres (16 mi) north of the city of Yogyakarta, on the southern slopes of Mount Merapi.

Kaliurang is a resort town, popular as a weekend destination for visitors from Yogyakarta. Attractions include the cool air, views, and an extensive forested park with trails. The town charges a small admission fee to visitors, paid at a booth on the busy main road from Yogyakarta.

The town was the location of negotiations during the fighting between the Dutch and Indonesians in the 1940s, when the houses and holiday homes owned by the Sultanate of Yogyakarta were used. Kaliurang has been an important base for vulcanologists in their monitoring of eruptions of Merapi, especially when the southern slopes of the volcano become active.

== Adjacent hills ==
In the 1970s there was an observatory on the hill Plawangan, which is closer to Merapi, but with eruptions in the 1990s Plawangan was abandoned and the observatory moved to the town itself. There are also tunnels at the western base of Plawangan that were built in World War II.

The hill to the west of Plawangan is called Turgo and has sacred graves at its peak, which are associated with the early stages of Islam in Java.

== See also ==
- Ullen Sentalu Museum
