= Ullen Sentalu Museum =

Museum in Yogyakarta, Java, Indonesia

- Museum Ullen Sentalu ꦩꦸꦱꦶꦪꦸꦩ꧀ꦈꦭ꧀ꦭꦺꦤ꧀ꦱꦼꦤ꧀ꦠꦭꦸ
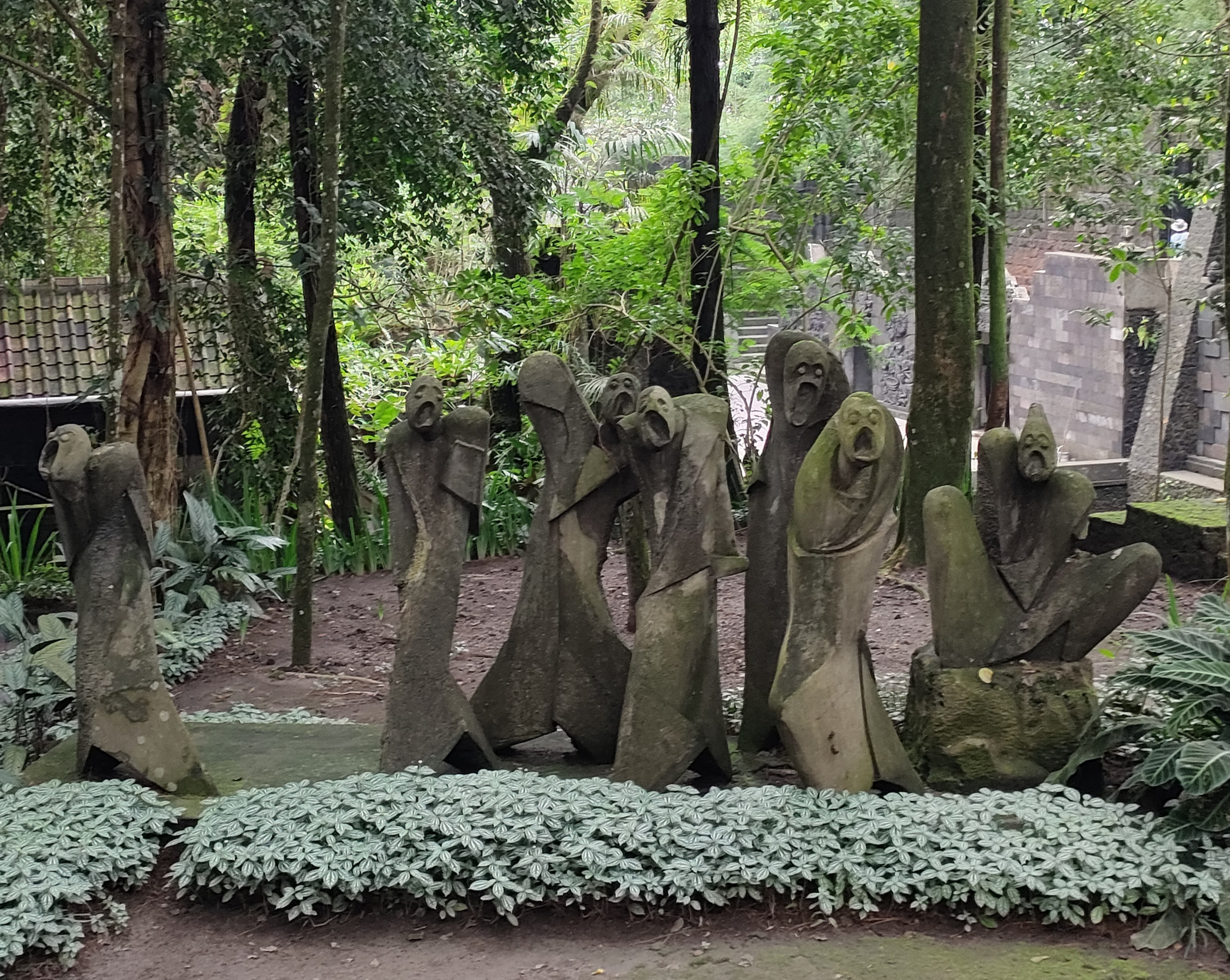

- Location in Java
- Established: 1994
- Location: Kaliurang, Sleman Regency, Yogyakarta
- Coordinates: 7.597973°S 110.423174°E
- Website: www.ullensentalu.com

The Ullen Sentalu Museum (Indonesian: Museum Ullen Sentalu; Javanese: ꦩꦸꦱꦶꦪꦸꦩ꧀ꦈꦭ꧀ꦭꦺꦤ꧀ꦱꦼꦤ꧀ꦠꦭꦸ, romanized: Musiyum Ullèn Sentalu) is a Javanese culture and art museum located in Kaliurang highland, Sleman Regency, Special Region of Yogyakarta, Indonesia. The museum displays relics and artifact from royal houses and kratons of Java, such as Yogyakarta, Pakualam, Surakarta, and Mangkunegaran.

== History ==
Ullen Sentalu Museum is a private museum that was initiated by Haryono family and now is managed by Ulating Blencong Foundation. It was established in 1994 and officially inaugurated on March 1, 1997, coinciding with the date commemorated every year as a historical day for Yogyakarta City. The inauguration was done by KGPAA Paku Alam VIII, who was at that time the Governor of Yogyakarta Special Province.

Some prominent figures have become members and counselors of the foundation, among other I.S.K.S. Paku Buwono XII of Kasunanan Surakarta Hadiningrat, KGPAA Paku Alam VIII of Pakualaman Principality, GBPH Poeger - Son of Sultan HB VIII - , GRAy Siti Nurul Kusumawardhani - daughter of Mangkunegara VII - , Hartini Sukarno - wife of the late President Sukarno - , and KP. Dr. Samuel Wedyadiningrat DSB. Konk.

== Admission ==
IDR 100,000 (International visitor) IDR 40,000 (Domestic/regular visitor/kitas)

== Secretariat ==
Jl. Plemburan 10, Yogyakarta Indonesia 55581

== Literature ==
- Lenzi, Iola (2004). Museums of Southeast Asia. Singapore: Archipelago Press. p. 200 pages. ISBN 981-4068-96-9.
