= Royal Ambarrukmo =

Hotel in Sleman, Yogyakarta, Indonesia

Hotel Royal Ambarrukmo
- ꦫꦺꦴꦪꦭ꧀ꦄꦩ꧀ꦧꦂꦫꦸꦏ꧀ꦩꦺꦴ
- Former names: Ambarrukmo Palace Hotel

General information
- Location: Jl. Laksda Adisucipto No.81, Ambarukmo, Caturtunggal, Sleman, Yogyakarta
- Coordinates: 7.7828405°S 110.4006113°E
- Opened: 1966

Other information
- Number of rooms: 247

Website
- www.royalambarrukmo.com

Kedhaton Ambarrukmo
- ꦏꦺꦢꦠꦺꦴꦤ꧀ꦄꦩ꧀ꦧꦫꦸꦏ꧀ꦩꦺꦴ
- Former names: Pesanggrahan Arjopurno

General information
- Architectural style: Javanese
- Construction started: 1857
- Completed: 1859

Design and construction
- Designations: Cagar Budaya Republik Indonesia PM.25/PW.007/MKP/2007

The Royal Ambarrukmo Yogyakarta is a hotel located in Sleman Regency, Yogyakarta, Indonesia. The hotel was built at the direction of Indonesian President Sukarno from 1964 until 1966, along with Jakarta's Hotel Indonesia, Pelabuhan Ratu's Hotel Samudera, and Bali's Bali Beach Hotel. The hotel was built on the site of the former Ambarrukmo Palace, a 19th-century royal residence of the Yogyakarta Sultanate, from which the hotel derives its name. The buildings of the former palace still stands and is now housed within the hotel compound.

== History ==
=== The site ===
The hotel is built within the complex of the former Ambarrukmo Palace. The palace, known locally as Kedhaton Ambarukmo was the built by the Yogyakarta Sultan, Hamengkubuwono VI between 1857 and 1859 to serve as a royal residence, as well as a meeting place between the royal family Governor-General of the Dutch East Indies. The building was an expansion of an 18th-century royal garden that was built by Hamengkubuwono V as a place to welcome diplomatic envoys. At the time, the palace was known as Pesanggrahan Arjopurno, literally meaning residence of harmony. Between 1895 and 1897, the palace was renovated by Hamengkubuwono VIII, and was given its current name. Under his rule, Ambarrukmo Palace was made the primary meeting point between the royal families of Yogyakarta and Surakarta. Despite being a secondary palace, Ambarrukmo had all the features and functions of a keraton and was considered a miniature of the main palace of Yogyakarta.

In 1940, the palace complex was temporarily repurposed as the Police Inspector Academy of the Republic of Indonesia, before later becoming the seat of the Government of Sleman, during Regent Pringgodiningrat's term.

=== The hotel ===
In 1957, under the instructions of President Sukarno and Hamengkubuwono IX, construction started on the hotel, located within the complex, east of the palace building. The hotel's construction was financed with Japanese reparation funds following World War II. The Ambarrukmo Palace Hotel opened on March 20, 1966, managed by Tokyo-based Okura Hotels and was the first luxury hotel in Yogyakarta. Okura ceased operating the hotel in 1971. Sheraton assumed management in the late 1970s, and the hotel was renamed the Hotel Ambarrukmo-Sheraton, before becoming the Ambarrukmo Palace Hotel again in the early 1980s. The hotel underwent a significant refurbishment in 2004 and reopened in 2011 as the Royal Ambarrukmo. As part of the hotel's compound, the former palace's main building, called Pendopo Agung Ambarrukmo was turned into a small museum showcasing Javanese culture and the palace's regal traditions. Additionally, many of the former palace's other buildings have been repurposed as public spaces for the hotel; this includes the Gandhok Tengen that once was the residence of the princesses, now serving as the hotel's spa.

The complex was granted the status of Warisan Nasional Gedung by the Indonesian Government in 1992, making it a building protected under Indonesian law. In 2007, the complex was granted a separate cultural heritage status.

== Architecture ==
Much of the former Ambarrukmo Palace was built in a traditional Javanese style, and features a Pendopo Agung, Ndalem Ageng, Bale Kambang, Gandhok, Pacaosan and an Alun-Alun, each of them once serving a specific function for the royal family. As all the buildings have functions that mirror those within the main palace, the Ambarrukmo Palace was also considered a keraton. Each of the buildings feature a Javanese Joglo-style roof, and adorned with traditional Javanese building decorations like lung-lungan, saton, tlacapan, wajikan, praba, and mirong. The mirong, in particular is a decorative element that reflects of the residence simultaneously existing with the existence of a sultan. The Bale Kambang, located towards the back of the compound, is unique amongst the palace's buildings due to being built with a fusion of Dutch and Javanese architecture. It was once used as a meditative area for the sultan, and its surrounding pools were used as a place of leisure of the sultan's consorts and daughters. Now, the former palace buildings have been repurposed as a small museum displaying artefacts of past Yogyakarta sultans, including numerous photographs, royal batiks, and royal texts.

The Royal Ambarrukmo hotel building, completed in 1966, was built in an International Style as was common at the time, similar to the styles of Sukarno's other hotel developments, Hotel Indonesia in Jakarta, Hotel Samudera in Pelabuhan Ratu, and Sanur's Bali Beach Hotel. Apart from the buildings of the former palace, the hotel also houses several artworks commissioned in the 1960s by local artists, including two large mosaic murals telling the story of the life of Yogyakartans and Javans.
