= Plawangan =

Hill on side of Mount Merapi, Java, Indonesia

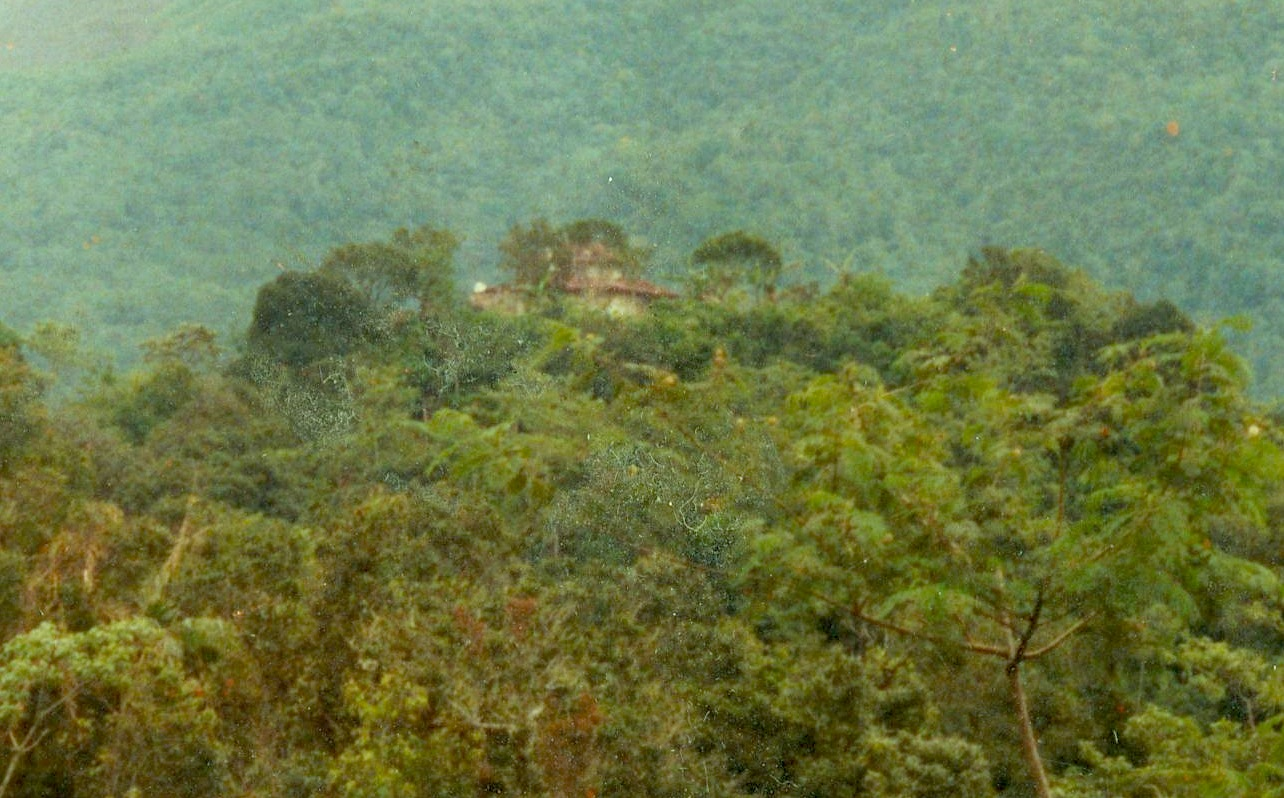
Plawangan vulcanology/observation post in 1985, forested slopes of Mount Merapi at rear

Plawangan is a hill above the town of Kaliurang, on the southern slopes of Gunung Merapi, in Sleman Regency, Special Region of Yogyakarta, Indonesia. It is east of Turgo, which is another named hill above Kaliurang.

Formerly a vulcanological post of the Indonesian volcanology service, it was abandoned in the 1990s following serious southerly nuee ardente and gas clouds in the vicinity. Under its western side are large man-made caves and tunnels, said by locals to have been made under the orders of Japanese military administrators during World War II. It is also located within the Plawangan Turgo nature reserve an almost 200 hectares on the slope of Merapi that has rare animals and plants occurring in its area.
