= Pakembinangun =

Village in Sleman Regency, Yogyakarta, Indonesia

Pakembinangun (Javanese: ꦥꦏꦼꦩ꧀ꦧꦶꦤꦔꦸꦤ꧀, romanized: Pakembinangun) is one of the kalurahan (villages) located in Pakem District, Sleman Regency, Special Region of Yogyakarta Province, Indonesia. Before 1946, this area was initially part of Wonogiri Village, Padasan Village, and Pakem Village. However, these three villages were merged into a single autonomous kalurahan in 1946.

== History ==
Before 1946, the Pakembinangun area was part of three villages: Wonogiri Village, led by Lurah Pawiroharjo (Sempu); Padasan Village, led by Lurah Harjodimulyo (Sambi); and Pakem Village, led by Lurah Pawiro Sastro (Gambiran). However, based on a decree issued by the Government of the Special Region of Yogyakarta in 1946 concerning "Kalurahan Administration", the three villages were merged into a single autonomous kalurahan named "Pakembinangun". Pakembinangun was officially designated as a kalurahan through Decree No. 5 of 1948 on "Changes in Kalurahan Areas".

== Geographical conditions ==
According to Krisnata, Virgawati, and Julianto, Pakembinangun is characterized by an elevation of 415–518 meters above sea level, with flat to gently sloping topography. The soil type in this area is regosol, with a sandy loam texture. The total area spans 419.3084 hectares, consisting of residential land (95.5764 hectares), rice fields (287.0520 hectares), open fields (1.5000 hectares), burial grounds (1.6800 hectares), and rivers and roads (33.5000 hectares). The highest point in the area is at an elevation of + 525 meters above sea level, while the lowest point is at + 382 meters above sea level.

The kalurahan comprises 10 padukuhan (hamlets):

- Demen (7 neighborhood units).
- Duwetsari (5 neighborhood units).
- Kertodadi (3 neighborhood units).
- Pakemgede (5 neighborhood units).
- Pakemtegal (6 neighborhood units).
- Paraksari (4 neighborhood units).
- Purwodadi (4 neighborhood units).
- Sambi (2 neighborhood units).
- Sempu (5 neighborhood units).
- Sukunan (6 neighborhood units).

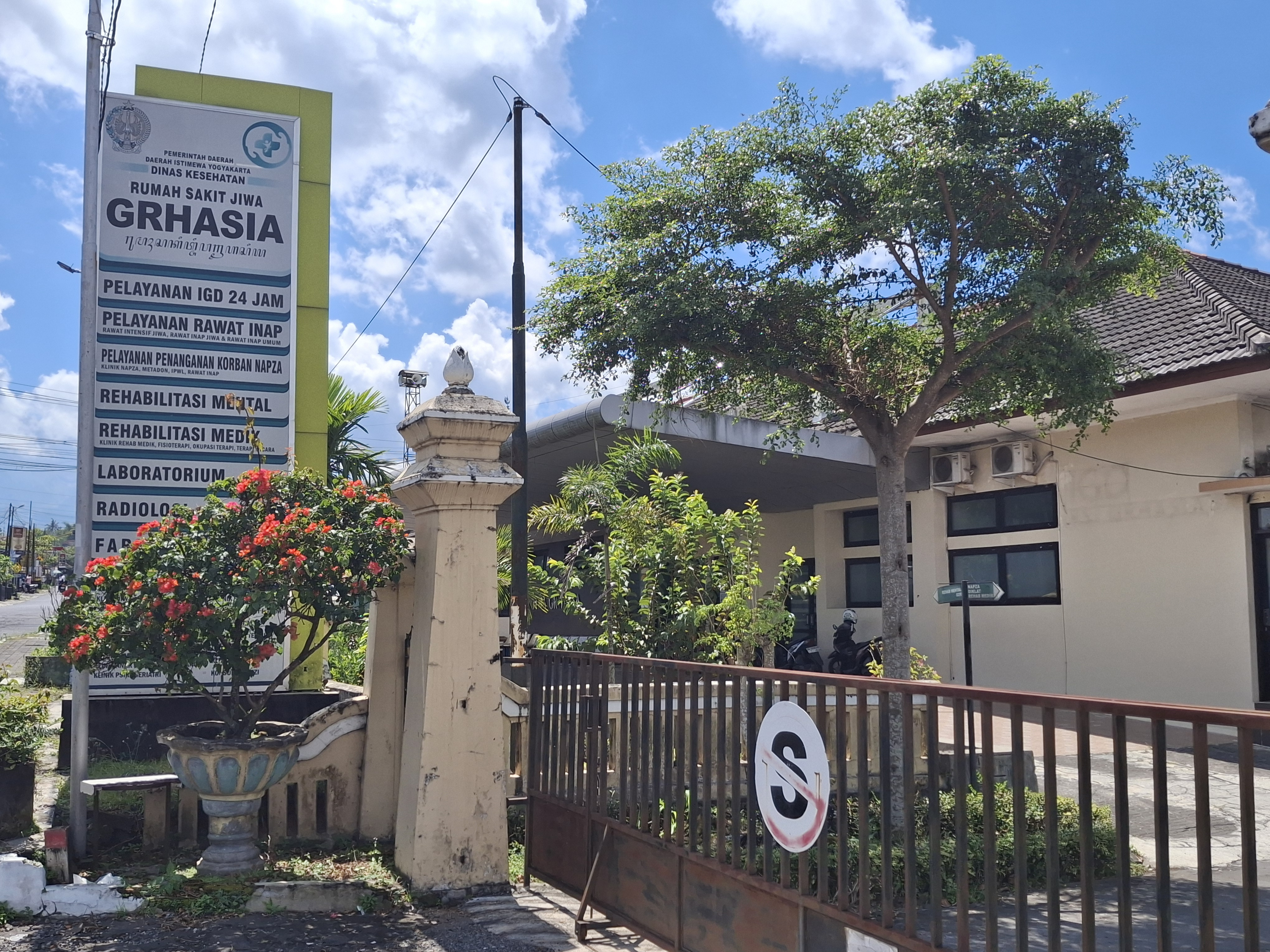
Grhasia Mental Hospital.

The geographical boundaries of Pakembinangun are:

- North: Hargobinangun Village.
- East: Wukirsari Village.
- South: Umbulmartani Village.
- West: Harjobinangun Village.

Pakembinangun is strategically located and equipped with good infrastructure, facilitating easier mobility for residents. Key economic and social facilities include a post office, two major hospitals (Grhasia Mental Hospital and Panti Nugroho Hospital), a traditional market, bank branches, a pawnshop, a public transport terminal, and proximity to Islamic University of Indonesia and the Bank Rakyat Indonesia (BRI) Employee Training Center (2–3 kilometers away).

As a kalurahan in a mountainous area, most of Pakembinangun serves as a greenbelt. According to Wati and Budiani, Pakembinangun is the capital of Kapanewon Pakem, making it a hub for agropolitan facilities. Local communities actively manage water resources, such as irrigation channels, springs, and river basins. The main agricultural product in this agropolitan area is rice.

== Economic conditions ==
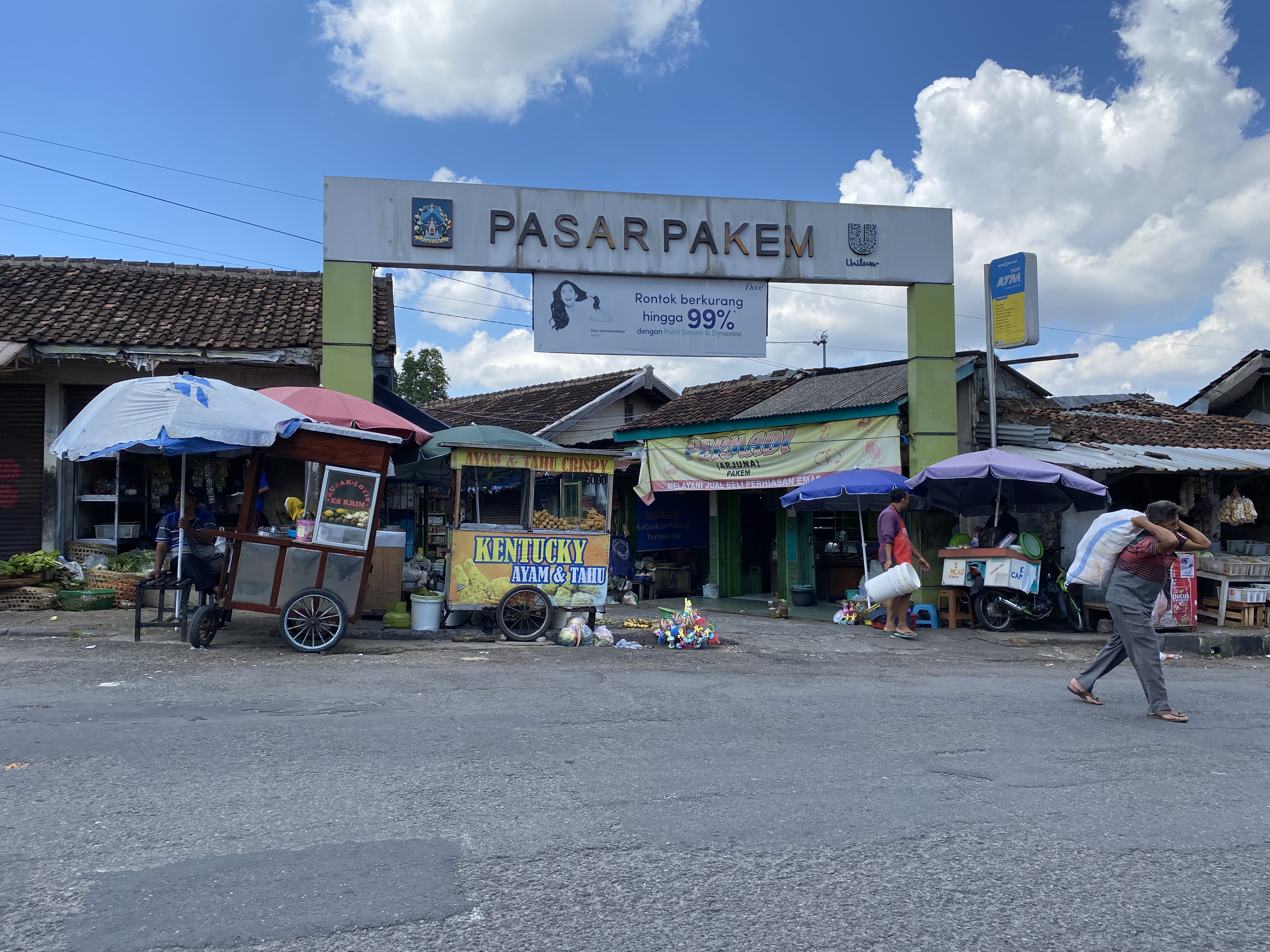
Pakem Market.

The majority of Pakembinangun's residents work as private employees, followed by entrepreneurs, farmers/gardeners, merchant, casual laborers, and civil servants. The economic center is located at Pakem Market, approximately + 500 meters from the village office. Culinary businesses, including processed food products and goods from local residents, support tourism in the area. According to the 2022 Pakembinangun Kalurahan Administration Report, residents and community groups have been trained in micro, small, and medium enterprises (MSMEs), focusing on food processing, crafts, and other marketable products to enhance their economic value.

== Tourist attractions ==
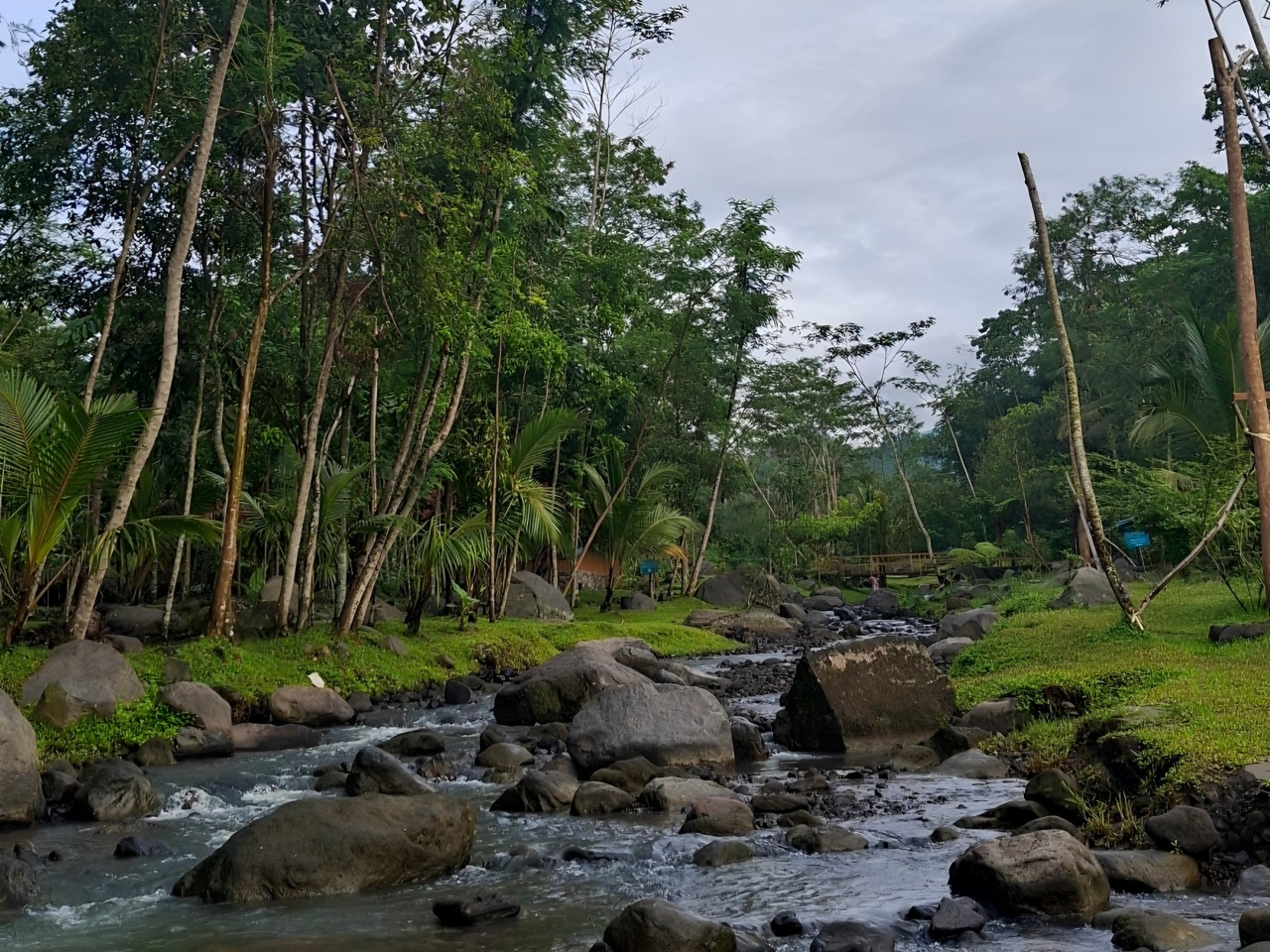
Ledok Sambi.

Key tourist attractions in Pakembinangun include:

- Sambi Tourism Village.
- Pakembinangun Reservoir.
- Ledok Sambi.
- Lor Sambi.

== Village heads ==
The list of village heads who have served in Pakembinangun includes their names, origins, and periods of service.

No.	Name	Origin	Period
1.	Hardjodimulyo	Kertodadi	1946–1965
2.	Mujono	Paraksari	1965–1982
3.	Aris Munandar^{*)}	Pakemgede	1983–1985
4.	Suhardjono	Balong	1986–1995
5.	Dik Wardanis Kuntohadi	Pesanggrahan	1996–1998
6.	Noor Edi Pamungkas	Sukunan	1999–2007
7.	Huri Kristana	Pakemtegal	2007–2009
8.	Suharto H.S.	Pakemtegal	2010–2016
9.	Djoko Mulyono	Demen	2016–2017
10.	Suranto	Wonogiri	2017–now
	Notes:^{*)} Provisional official.		

== Bibliography ==
Book

- Pemerintah Kalurahan Pakembinangun, Kapanewon Pakem, Kabupaten Sleman (2023). Laporan Penyelenggaraan Pemerintahan Kalurahan Pakembinangun Tahun Anggaran 2022 (PDF). Sleman: Pemerintah Kalurahan Pakembinangun, Kapanewon Pakem, Kabupaten Sleman.

Journal

- Ermawati, Kris Cahyani; Satiti, Emmelia Nadira (2023). "Strategi Pengembangan Lor Sambi Sebagai Wisata Outbound di Yogyakarta". Jurnal Sains Terapan Pariwisata. 8 (2): 135–144. doi:10.56743/jstp.v8i2.271.
- Krisnata, Wendy; Virgawati, Sari; Julianto, Eko Amiadji (2022). "Kesesuaian Lahan untuk Tanaman Anggur di Kalurahan Pakembinangun, Kapanewon Pakem, Daerah Istimewa Yogyakarta". Jurnal Tanah Dan Air (Soil and Water Journal). 19 (1): 25–30. doi:10.31315/jta.v19i1.9462.
- Muhaimin; Seran, Yuventus; Digdowiseiso, Kumba (2023). "Analisis Implementasi Kebijakan Pengelolaan Dana Desa di Desa Pakembinangun, Kecamatan Pakem, Kabupaten Sleman". Costing: Journal of Economic, Business, and Accounting. 6 (2): 2632–2646.
- Wati, Ambar Kusuma; Budiani, Sri Rahayu (2017). "Hubungan Kawasan Agropolitan terhadap Kondisi Sosial dan Ekonomi Petani di Desa Pakembinangun, Kecamatan Pakem, Kabupaten Sleman". Jurnal Bumi Indonesia. 6 (1): 1–9.
