= Mount Merapi =

Active stratovolcano in Central Java and Yogyakarta, Indonesia

- ꦒꦸꦤꦸꦁꦩꦼꦫꦥꦶ Gunung Merapi
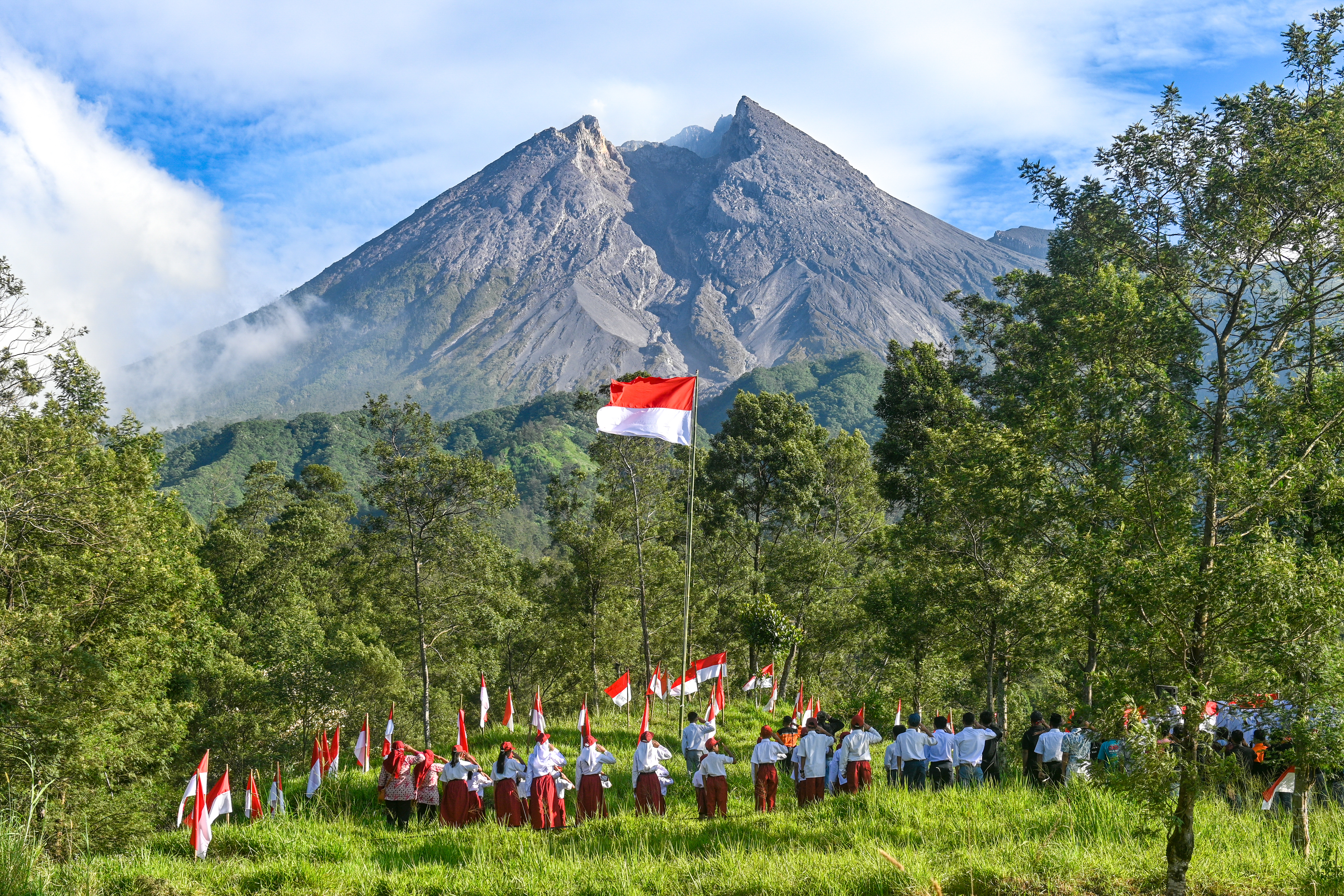
- Flag ceremony on the slopes of Mount Merapi during Indonesia's 75th Independence Day celebration, 17 August 2020

Highest point
- Elevation: 2,968 m (9,738 ft)
- Prominence: 1,356 m (4,449 ft)
- Listing: Ribu
- Coordinates: 07°32′29″S 110°26′46″E

Naming
- English translation: Mountain of Fire
- Language of name: Indonesian

Geography
- Location within Java

Geology
- Rock age: 400,000 years
- Mountain type: Stratovolcano
- Volcanic arc: Sunda Arc
- Last eruption: Ongoing

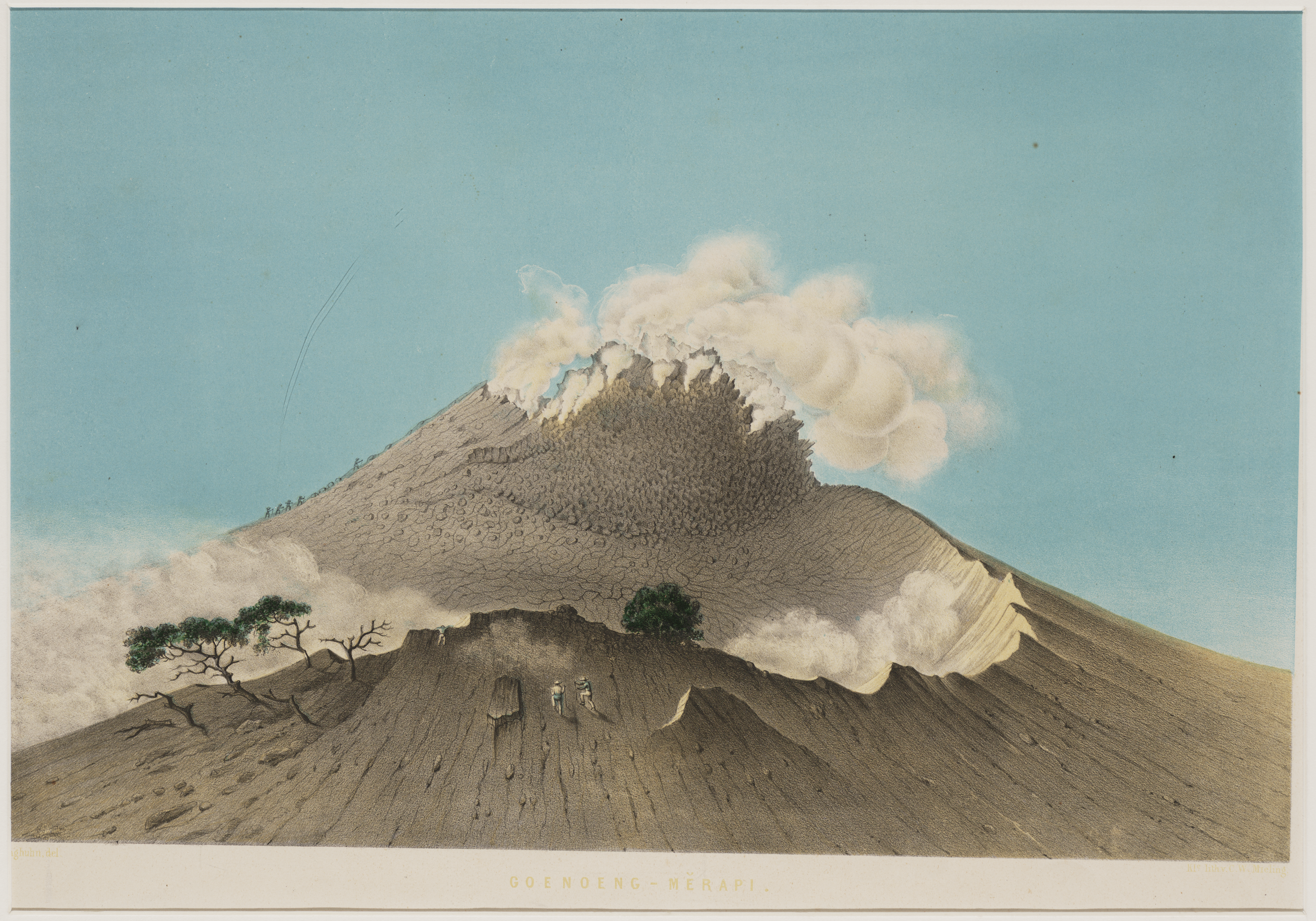
Mount Merapi, colour lithograph, Junghuhn and Mieling, 1853–1854

Mount Merapi (Indonesian: Gunung Merapi; Javanese: ꦒꦸꦤꦸꦁꦩꦼꦫꦥꦶ, romanized: gunung měrapi, lit. 'Fire Mountain') is an active stratovolcano located on the border between the province of Central Java and the Special Region of Yogyakarta, Indonesia. It is the most active volcano in Indonesia and has erupted regularly since 1548. It is located approximately 28 km (17 mi) north of Yogyakarta city which has a population of 2.4 million. Thousands of people live on the flanks of the volcano, with villages as high as 1,700 m (5,577 ft) above sea level.

Smoke can often be seen rising from the mountaintop, and several eruptions have caused fatalities. A pyroclastic flow from a large explosion killed 27 people on 22 November 1994, mostly in the town of Muntilan, west of the volcano. Another large eruption occurred in 2006, shortly before the Yogyakarta earthquake. In light of the hazards that Merapi poses to populated areas, it was designated as one of the Decade Volcanoes, which are considered worthy of particular study in light of their history of large, destructive eruptions and proximity to densely populated areas.

On the afternoon of 25 October 2010, Merapi erupted on its southern and southeastern slopes. A total of 353 people were killed over the next month, while 350,000 were forced to flee their homes; most of the damage was done by pyroclastic flows, while heavy rain on 4 November created lahars which caused further damage. Most of the fissures had ceased erupting by 30 November, and four days later the official threat level was lowered. Merapi's characteristic shape was changed during the eruptions, with its height lowered by 38 m (125 ft) to 2,930 m (9,613 ft).

Since 2010, Merapi has experienced several smaller eruptions, most noticeably two phreatic eruptions which occurred on 18 November 2013 and 11 May 2018. The first and larger of these, caused by a combination of rainfall and internal activity, saw smoke issued up to a height of 2,000 m (6,562 ft). There have been several small eruptions since the beginning of 2020, (Note: The most recent eruptions so far were on 3 March 2020, 27 March 2020, 7 January 2021, 8 August 2021 and 16 August 2021.) which are of great interest to volcanologists.

== Etymology ==
The name Merapi is a compound word of Sanskrit Meru meaning "mountain" with Javanese api which means "fire". The term Merapi can be loosely translated as "Mountain of Fire" or "Fire Mountain".

According to Mahdi (2005), the name of the volcano "Merapi" is derived from an Old Malay affixation of the Old Malay word api (fire) with the prefix, mər- which is believed to be an ancestor of the ber- prefix of modern Malay and Indonesian. He also believes that the same applies to the name of the volcano, Mount Marapi of West Sumatra. If mər- is indeed the ancestor of modern Malay and Indonesian ber-, then that would make the name of the volcano morphologically identical to the Malay and Indonesian word berapi (to spew out fire) which, combined with the word, gunung (mountain), would make up the modern Malay and Indonesian word for "volcano", gunung berapi.

== History ==
=== Geological history ===
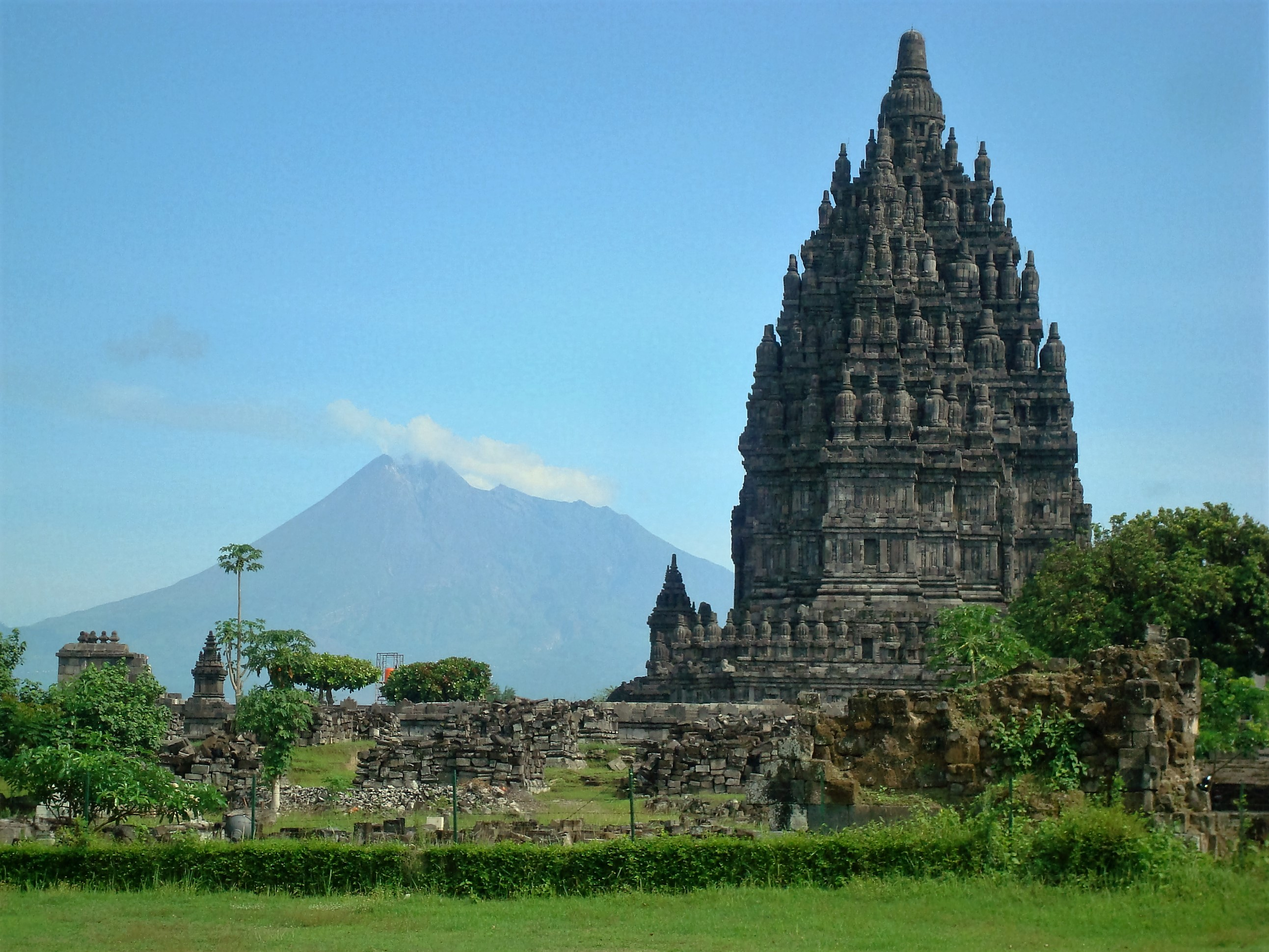
Mount Merapi viewed from 9th-century Prambanan Hindu temple, built during Mataram kingdom era

Merapi is the youngest in a group of volcanoes in southern Java. It is situated at a subduction zone, where the Indo-Australian plate is subducting under the Sunda plate. It is one of at least 129 active volcanoes in Indonesia, part of the volcano is located in the Southeastern part of the Pacific Ring of Fire—a section of fault lines stretching from the Western Hemisphere through Japan and South East Asia. Stratigraphic analysis reveals that eruptions in the Merapi area began about 400,000 years ago, and from then until about 10,000 years ago, eruptions were typically effusive, and the out flowing lava emitted was basaltic. Since then, eruptions have become more explosive, with viscous andesitic lavas often generating lava domes. Dome collapse has often generated pyroclastic flows, and larger explosions, which have resulted in eruption columns, have also generated pyroclastic flows through column collapse.

Typically, small eruptions occur every two to three years, and larger ones every 10–15 years or so. Notable eruptions, often causing many deaths, have occurred in 1006, 1786, 1822, 1872, and 1930. Thirteen villages were destroyed in the latter one, and 1,400 people were killed by pyroclastic flows.

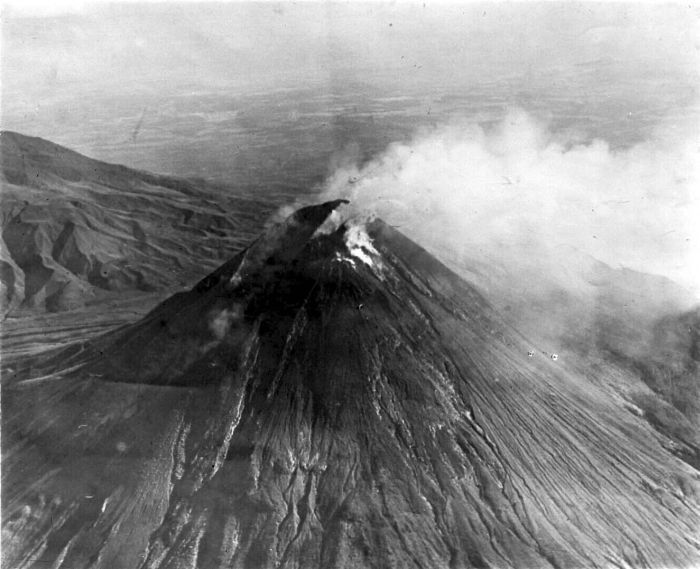
Merapi in 1930

The very large eruption in 1006 is claimed to have covered all of central Java with ash. The volcanic devastation is claimed to have led to the collapse of the Hindu Kingdom of Mataram; however, the evidence from that era is insufficient for this to be substantiated.

=== 2006 eruption ===
In April, increased seismicity at more regular intervals and a detected bulge in the volcano's cone indicated that fresh eruptions were imminent. Authorities put the volcano's neighboring villages on high alert and local residents prepared for a likely evacuation. On 19 April smoke from the crater reached a height of 400 m (1,300 ft), compared to 75 m (246 ft) the previous day. On 23 April, after nine surface tremors and some 156 multifaced quakes signalled movements of magma, some 600 elderly and infant residents of the slopes were evacuated.

By early May, active lava flows had begun. On 11 May, with lava flow beginning to be constant, some 17,000 people were ordered to be evacuated from the area and on 13 May, Indonesian authorities raised the alert status to the highest level, ordering the immediate evacuation of all residents on the mountain. Many villagers defied the dangers posed by the volcano and returned to their villages, fearing that their livestock and crops would be vulnerable to theft. Activity calmed by the middle of May.

On 27 May, a 6.3 magnitude earthquake struck roughly 50 km (31 mi) southwest of Merapi, killing at least 5,000 and leaving at least 200,000 people homeless in the Yogyakarta region, heightening fears that Merapi would "blow". The quake did not appear to be a long-period oscillation, a seismic disturbance class that is increasingly associated with major volcanic eruptions. A further 11,000 villagers were evacuated on 6 June as lava and superheated clouds of gas poured repeatedly down its upper slopes towards Kaliadem, a location that was located southeast of Mt. Merapi. The pyroclastic flows are known locally as "wedhus gembel" (Javanese for "shaggy goat"). There were two fatalities as the result of the eruption.

=== 2010 eruption ===
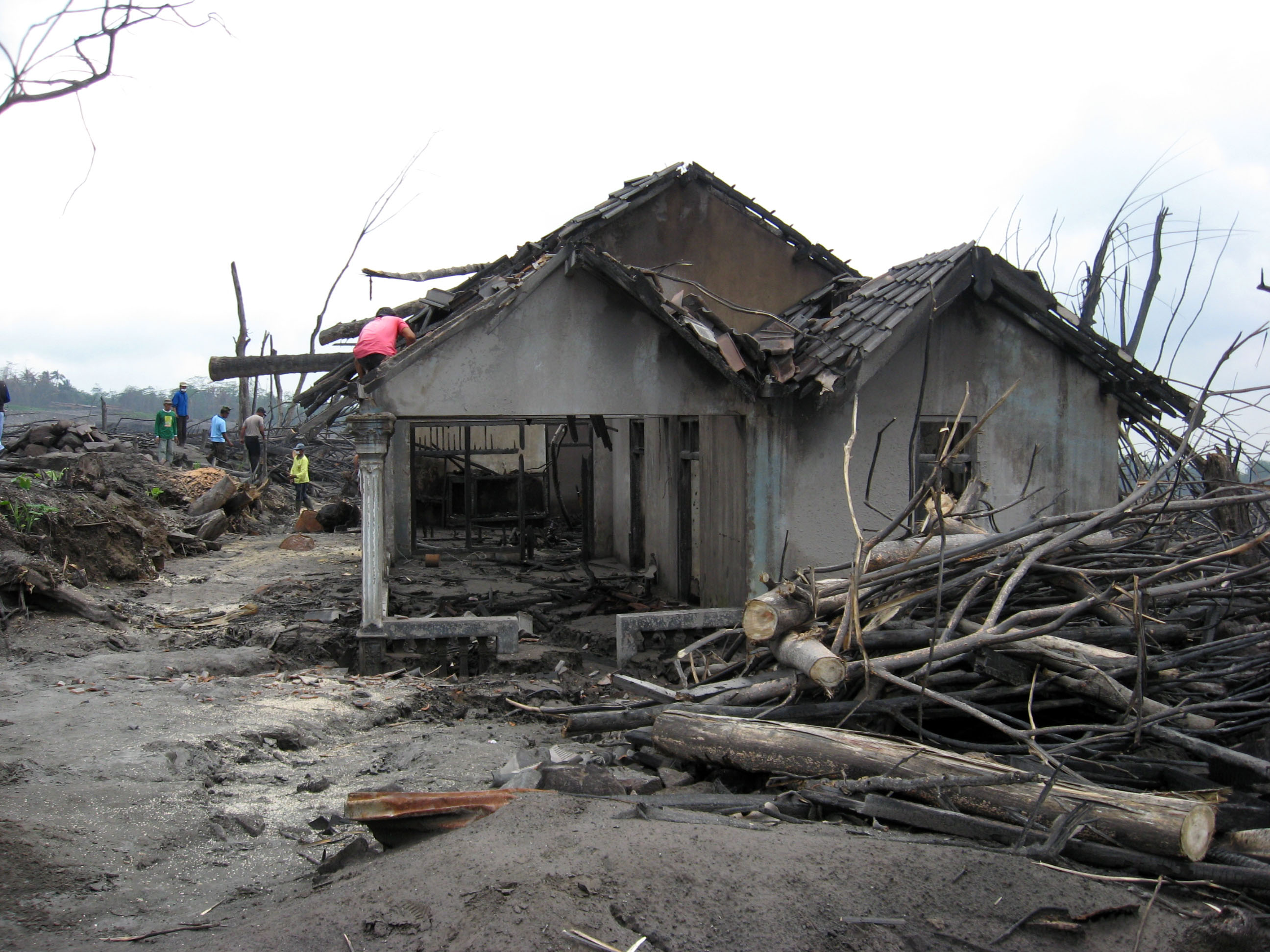
Destroyed house in Cangkringan Village after the 2010 eruptions

In late October, the Center for Volcanology and Geological Hazard Mitigation, Geological Agency (CVGHM), (Indonesian language—Pusat Vulkanologi & Mitigasi Bencana Geologi, Badan Geologi-PVMBG), reported that a pattern of increasing seismicity from Merapi had begun to emerge in early September.

Observers at Babadan 7 km (4.3 mi) west and Kaliurang 8 km (5.0 mi) south of the mountain reported hearing an avalanche on 12 September. On 13 September, white plumes were observed rising 800 m (2,600 ft) above the crater. Lava dome inflation, detected since March, increased from background levels of 0.1 mm (0.0039 in) to 0.3 mm (0.012 in) per day to a rate of 11 mm (0.43 in) per day on 16 September. On 19 September, earthquakes continued to be numerous, and the next day CVGHM raised the Alert Level to 2 (on a scale of 1–4). Lava from Mount Merapi in Central Java began flowing down the Gendol River on 23–24 October signalling the likelihood of an imminent eruption.

On 25 October, the Indonesian government raised the alert for Mount Merapi to its highest level (4) and warned villagers in threatened areas to move to safer ground. People living within a 10 km (6.2 mi) zone were told to evacuate. The evacuation orders affected at least 19,000 people; however, the number that complied at the time remained unclear to authorities. Officials said about 500 volcanic earthquakes had been recorded on the mountain over the weekend of 23–24 October, and that the magma had risen to about 1 km (3,300 ft) below the surface due to the seismic activity.

After a period of multiple eruptions considered to exceed the intensity and duration of those in 1872 on 10 November 2010 the intensity and frequency of eruptions was noticed to subside. By this time, 153 people had been reported to have been killed and 320,000 were displaced. Later the eruptive activities again increased requiring a continuation of the Level 4 alert and continued provision of exclusion zones around the volcano. By 18 November the death toll had increased to 275. The toll had risen to 324 by 24 November and Syamsul Maarif, head of the National Disaster Mitigation Agency (BNPB) explained that the death toll had risen after a number of victims succumbed to severe burns and more bodies were found on the volcano's slopes.

In the aftermath of the more intensive eruptive activities in late November, Yogyakarta's Disaster Management Agency reported that there were about 500 reported cases of eruption survivors in Sleman district suffering from minor to severe psychological problems, and about 300 cases in Magelang. By 3 December the death toll had risen to 353.

On 3 December, the head of the National Disaster Management Agency (BNPB), Dr. Syamsul Maarif, M. Si, accompanied by the head of the Centre for Volcanology and Geological Hazard Mitigation CVGHM (PVMBG), Dr. Surono made a joint press release at the BNPB Command Post in Yogyakarta. At 09.00 am that day, the CVGHM (PVMBG) lowered the status of Mount Merapi to the level of Caution Alert (Level III). They clarified that with this alert level the potential of hot ash clouds and projected incandescent material remained. The Geological Agency provided several recommendations including that there would be no community activities in the disaster prone areas and proclaimed an ongoing exclusion zone of 2.5 km (1.6 mi) radius.

=== 2018 eruption ===
A phreatic eruption began on the morning of 11 May, prompting the evacuation of areas within a 5 km (3.1 mi) radius of the volcano. Adisutjipto International Airport in Yogyakarta was closed due to the eruption's ash plume. This eruption initiated a new phase of dome growth. It led to new evacuations at Merapi in November 2020. The danger of pyroclastic flows was increasing and expanding.

=== 2021 eruption ===
Eruptions started on 4 January causing evacuations of the Yogyakarta region. The geological authority had invoked the second-highest alert level in November after sensors picked up increasing activity warning the situation could become more unstable. On 27 March, another small eruption occurred, spewing lava and creating pyroclastic flows. Merapi began erupting once again on 8 August 2021, sending new lava flows down the slope of the volcano. On 16 August, the volcano erupted again, belching a cloud of ash into the air as lava flowed down its crater. The explosions spewed clouds as far as 3.5 kilometres (2 miles) from the rumbling volcano, blanketing local communities in grey ash.

On 9 December, a pyroclastic flow traveled along the Bebeng River for a distance of 2.2 km. This comes just as Mount Semeru erupted in an unrelated event, killing at least 43 people.

=== 2023 eruption ===
An eruption started on 11 March at around 12 p.m. local time (Western Indonesia Time, GMT+7). A lava flow up to 7 kilometers long and a column of hot cloud rising up to 100 meters high were observed. Local authorities advised residents living in Merapi's slope to stay at least 7 kilometers away from the crater.

=== 2024 eruption ===
An eruption occurred on 19 January starting at 6:59 a.m. local time, with six pyroclastic flows reaching up to 2 kilometers being recorded. On 21 January, the volcano emitted a lava flow up to 2 kilometers long and a column of hot cloud rising up to 100 meters. Authorities advised residents living in Merapi's slope to stay at least 7 kilometers away from the crater.

== Monitoring ==
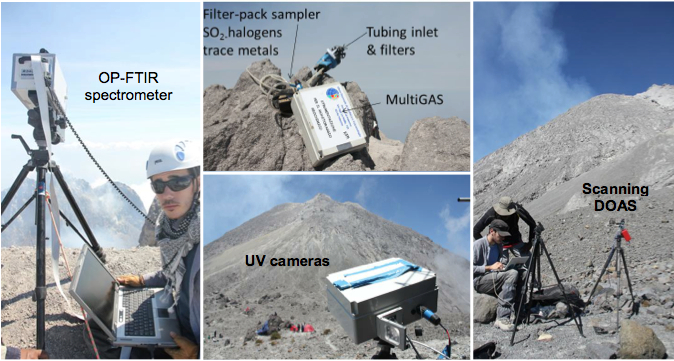
This image shows some of the instruments deployed by the Deep Carbon Degassing Project in the vicinity of Mount Merapi in 2014.

Mount Merapi is the site of a very active volcano monitoring program. Seismic monitoring began in 1924, with some of the volcano monitoring stations lasting until the present. The Babadan (northwest location), Selo (in the saddle between Merbabu and Merapi), and Plawangan monitoring stations have been updated with equipment over the decades since establishment. During the 1950s and early 1960s some of the stations were starved of equipment and funds, but after the 1970s considerable improvement occurred with the supply of new equipment. Some of the pre-1930 observation posts were destroyed by the 1930 eruption, and newer posts were re-located. Similarly after the 1994 eruption, the Plawangan post and equipment were moved into Kaliurang as a response to the threat of danger to the volcanological personnel at the higher point. This volcano is monitored by the Deep Earth Carbon Degassing Project.

The eruption of 1930 was found to have been preceded by a large earthquake swarm. The network of eight seismographs currently around the volcano allow volcanologists to accurately pinpoint the hypocentres of tremors and quakes.

A zone in which no quakes originate is found about 1.5 km below the summit, and is thought to be the location of the magma reservoir which feeds the eruptions.

Other measurements taken on the volcano include magnetic measurements and tilt measurements. Small changes in the local magnetic field have been found to coincide with eruptions, and tilt measurements reveal the inflation of the volcano caused when the magma chambers beneath it is filling up.

Lahars (a type of mudflow of pyroclastic material and water) are an important hazard on the mountain, and are caused by rain remobilizing pyroclastic flow deposits. Lahars can be detected seismically, as they cause a high-frequency seismic signal. Observations have found that about 50 mm of rain per hour is the threshold above which lahars are often generated.

== Check dam ==
There are about 90 units (30 percent) from the total 258 units of sand barriers (sabo) were damaged. The cost for recovery is about Rp 1 trillion ($116 million).

== Sterile zone ==
Following the 2010 eruption, three Indonesian government departments declared a prohibited zone in which nobody can permanently stay and no infrastructure is allowed in nine villages (dusun): Palemsari, Pangukrejo, Kaliadem, Jambu, Kopeng, Petung, Kalitengah Lor, Kalitengah Kidul and Srunen, all in Cangkringan district.

== National park ==
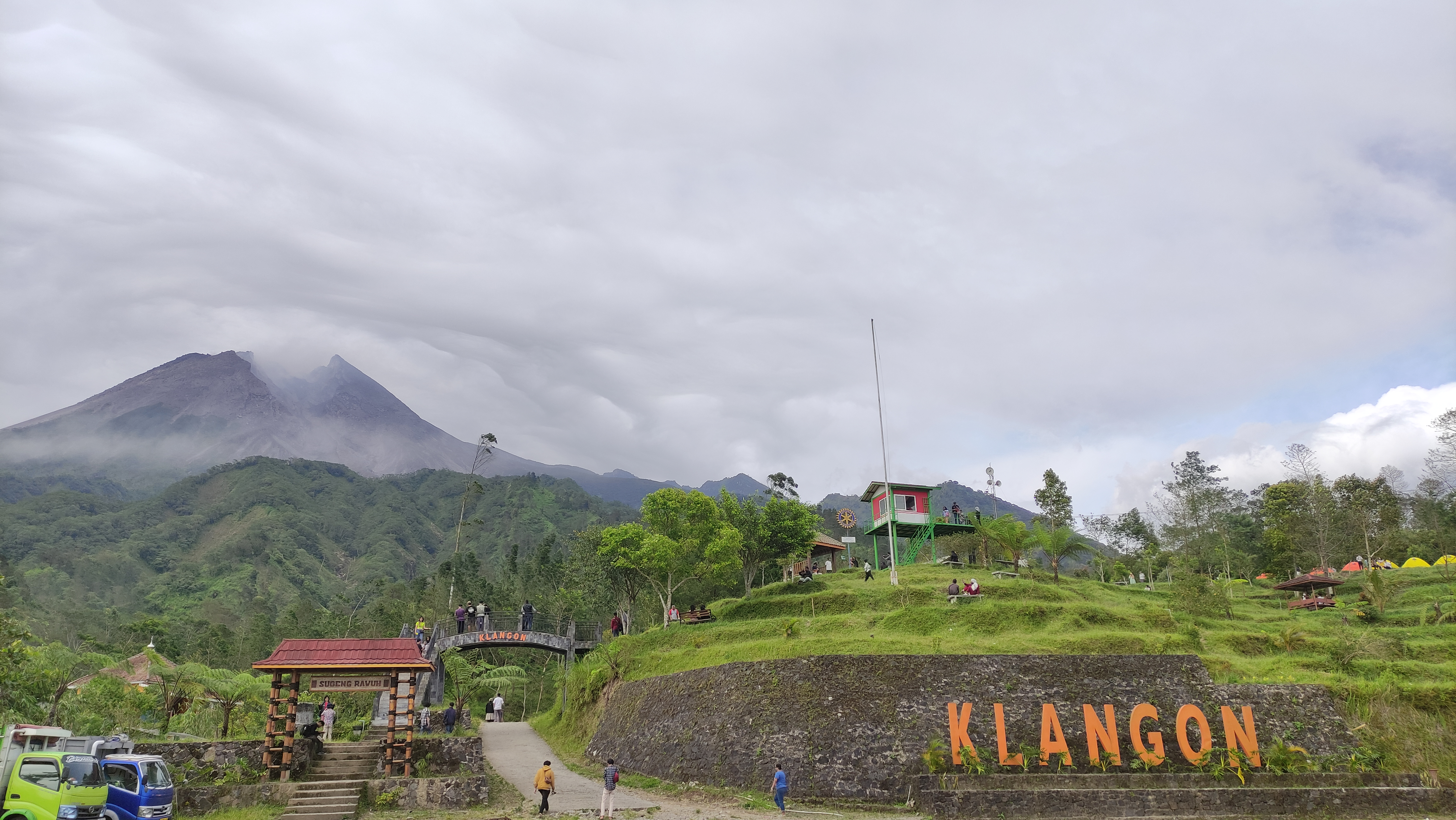
The peak of Merapi seen from Klangon

In 2004, an area of 6,410 hectares around Mount Merapi was established as a national park. The decision of the Ministry of Forestry to declare the park has been subsequently challenged in court by The Indonesian Forum for Environment, on grounds of lack of consultation with local residents. During the 2006 eruption of the volcano it was reported that many residents were reluctant to leave because they feared their residences would be confiscated for expansion of the national park, meaning they would not have a house.

== Museum ==
- Merapi Museum Center, Kaliurang Street Kilometer 25.7, Pakem subdistrict, Sleman, Yogyakarta. A replica of Merapi's Post 2010 eruption has been created and Indonesian student visits to the museum has increased 30 percent since the latest eruption.

== Mythology ==
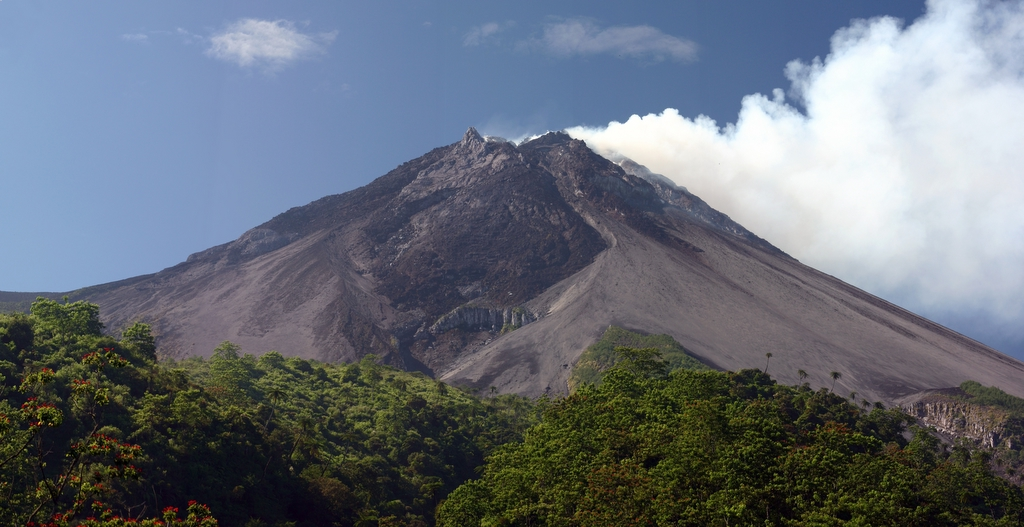
Merapi in July 2005. The constant smoke from its summit is said to come from two sacred armourers living under the mountain.

Merapi is very important to the Javanese people, especially those living around its crater. As such, there are many myths and beliefs attached to Merapi.

=== Creation ===
Although most nearby villages have their own myths about the creation of Mount Merapi, they have numerous commonalities. It is believed that when the gods had just created the Earth, Java was unbalanced because of the placement of Mount Jamurdipo on the west end of the island. In order to assure balance, the gods (generally represented by Batara Guru) ordered the mountain to be moved to the centre of Java. However, two armourers, Empu Rama and Empu Permadi, were already forging a sacred keris at the site where Mount Jamurdipo was to be moved. The gods warned them that they would be moving a mountain there, and that they should leave; Empu Rama and Empu Permadi ignored that warning. In anger, the gods buried Empu Rama and Empu Permadi under Mount Jamurdipo; their spirits later became the rulers of all mystical beings in the area. In memory of them, Mount Jamurdipo was later renamed Mount Merapi, which means "fire of Rama and Permadi."

=== Spirit Kraton of Merapi ===
The Javanese believe that the Earth is not only populated by human beings, but also by spirits (makhluk halus). Villages near Merapi believe that one of the palaces (in Javanese kraton) used by the rulers of the spirit kingdom lies inside Merapi, ruled by Empu Rama and Empu Permadi. This palace is said to be a spiritual counterpart to the Yogyakarta Sultanate, complete with roads, soldiers, princes, vehicles, and domesticated animals. Besides the rulers, the palace is said to also be populated by the spirits of ancestors who died as righteous people. The spirits of these ancestors are said to live in the palace as royal servants (abdi dalem), occasionally visiting their descendants in dreams to give prophecies or warnings.

=== Spirits of Merapi ===
For the Yogyakarta Sultanate, Merapi holds a significant cosmological symbolism, because it forms a sacred north–south axis line between Merapi's peak and the Indian Ocean, referred by locals as the Southern Ocean. The sacred axis is signified by Merapi peak in the north, the Tugu Yogyakarta monument near Yogyakarta main train station, the axis runs along Malioboro street to Northern Alun-alun (square) across Keraton Yogyakarta (sultan's palace), Southern Alun-alun, all the way to Bantul and finally reaching Samas and Parangkusumo beach on the estuary of Opak river and the Indian Ocean. This sacred axis connected the hyangs or spirits of mountain revered since ancient times—often identified as "Mbah Petruk" by Javanese people—The Sultan of Yogyakarta as the leader of the Javanese kingdom, and Nyi Roro Kidul as the queen of the Southern Ocean, the female ocean deity revered by Javanese people and also mythical consort of Javanese kings.

== See also ==
- 2010 eruptions of Mount Merapi
- List of volcanic eruptions by death toll
- List of volcanoes in Indonesia
- Decade Volcanoes
