= Sleman =

District in Indonesia

Coordinates: 7°42′00″S 110°19′59″E

Sleman is a kapanewon (administrative district) and the seat capital of Sleman Regency, Special Region of Yogyakarta, Indonesia. It is on the road between Yogyakarta and Magelang. Sleman consists of five villages, namely Caturharjo, Pandowoharjo, Tridadi, Triharjo, and Trimulyo.

It was also a stopping place on the railway that followed the same route, but is currently inactive.

== Climate ==
Sleman has a tropical monsoon climate (Am) with moderate to little rainfall from June to September and heavy to very heavy rainfall from October to May.

Climate data for Sleman
Month	Jan	Feb	Mar	Apr	May	Jun	Jul	Aug	Sep	Oct	Nov	Dec	Year
Mean daily maximum °C (°F)	29.0 (84.2)	29.2 (84.6)	29.5 (85.1)	30.4 (86.7)	30.3 (86.5)	30.2 (86.4)	29.5 (85.1)	30.0 (86.0)	30.3 (86.5)	30.7 (87.3)	29.8 (85.6)	29.1 (84.4)	29.8 (85.7)
Daily mean °C (°F)	25.4 (77.7)	25.4 (77.7)	25.6 (78.1)	26.2 (79.2)	26.0 (78.8)	25.4 (77.7)	24.5 (76.1)	24.8 (76.6)	25.5 (77.9)	26.1 (79.0)	25.8 (78.4)	25.3 (77.5)	25.5 (77.9)
Mean daily minimum °C (°F)	21.8 (71.2)	21.7 (71.1)	21.8 (71.2)	22.0 (71.6)	21.7 (71.1)	20.6 (69.1)	19.6 (67.3)	19.7 (67.5)	20.7 (69.3)	21.5 (70.7)	21.8 (71.2)	21.6 (70.9)	21.2 (70.2)
Average rainfall mm (inches)	368 (14.5)	320 (12.6)	361 (14.2)	213 (8.4)	165 (6.5)	91 (3.6)	36 (1.4)	26 (1.0)	48 (1.9)	145 (5.7)	258 (10.2)	314 (12.4)	2,345 (92.4)
Source: Climate-Data.org
