= Sleman Regency =

Regency in Yogyakarta, Indonesia

Sleman Regency ꦑꦧꦸꦥꦠꦺꦤ꧀ꦯ꧀ꦭꦺꦩꦤ꧀ Kabupaten Sleman
- Regency
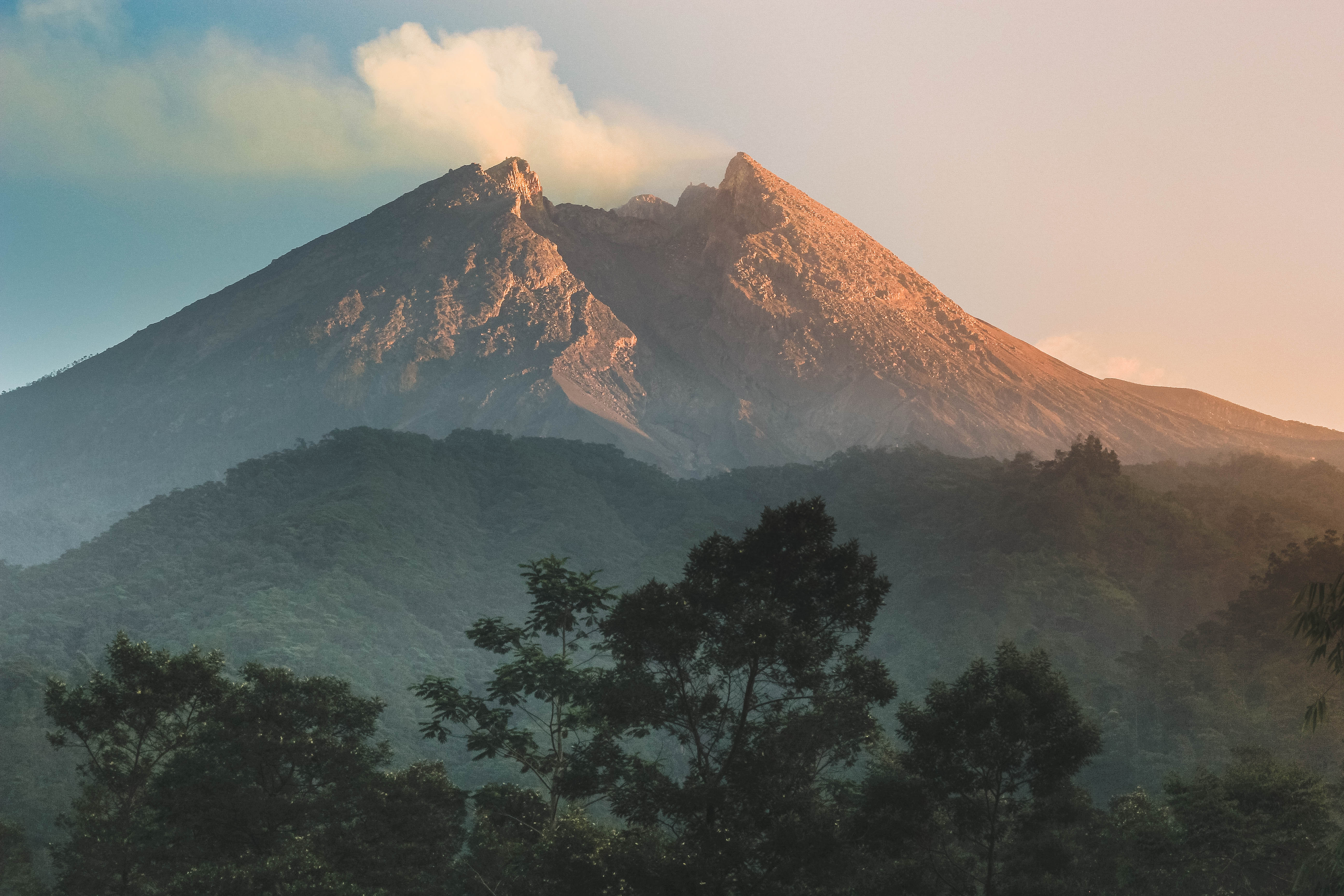
- Mount Merapi

- Seal
- Motto(s): Sleman Sembada: Sehat, Elok/Edi, Makmur/Merata, Bersih/Berbudaya, Aman/Adil, Damai/Dinamis, Agamis (Indonesian) "Healthy, Beautiful & Elegant, Prosperous & Equitable, Clean & Cultured, Safe & Fair, Peaceful & Dynamic, Religious"
- Sleman Regency in the Special Region of Yogyakarta
- Coordinates: 7°41′24.8881″S 110°20′31.1510″E
- Country: Indonesia
- Region: Java (Western Indonesia)
- Special Administrative Region: Yogyakarta
- Incorporated: 8 August 1950
- Capital: Sleman
- Kecamatan: List: Turi; Pakem; Cangkringan; Tempel; Sleman; Ngaglik; Ngemplak; Minggir; Seyegan; Mlati; Depok; Kalasan; Moyudan; Gamping; Berbah; Prambanan

Government
  - Regent: Harda Kiswaya
  - Vice Regent: Danang Maharsa

Area
  - Total: 574.82 km^{2} (221.94 sq mi)

Population (mid 2023 estimate)
  - Total: 1,157,292
  - Density: 2,013.3/km^{2} (5,214.5/sq mi)
- Time zone: UTC+7 (WIB)
- Post Code: 55500, 55200
- Area code: +62 274
- Vehicle registration: AB
- Regency bird: Orange-headed thrush
- Regency plant: Salak pondoh
- Website: sleman.go.id

Sleman Regency (Indonesian pronunciation: [səˈleman]; ) is an Indonesian regency (Indonesian: Kabupaten) on the island of Java. It is located in the north of the Special Region of Yogyakarta, Indonesia, and has an area of 574.82 square kilometres (221.94 sq mi), with a population of 1,093,110 at the 2010 Census and 1,125,804 at the 2020 Census; the official estimate as of mid-2023 was 1,157,292 - comprising 573,760 males and 583,540 females. Its capital is the town of Sleman. The current regent is Harda Kiswaya.

== History ==
=== Pre-Incorporation ===
During the 8th century, the Buddhist Sailendra dynasty controlled Sleman, building numerous temples such as Kalasan. The palace itself was at Ratu Boko.

After the fall of the Sailendra dynasty, the Mataram kingdom ruled over Sleman, taking control of Ratu Boko palace and eventually commingling with the remnants of the Sailendra dynasty.

The Sanjaya dynasty, which replaced the Mataram kingdom, later ruled over Sleman and is believed to have built Prambanan c. 850 CE.

The existence of Sleman as a regency can be traced back to 15 May 1916. The then Sultan Hamengkubuwono VII of the Yogyakarta Sultanate published Rijksblad No. 11 of 1916, which reorganized the sultanate's territory into three regencies, including Sleman. However, Sleman's status as a Regency was removed in 1927 in a reorganization under Hamengkubuwono VIII and its territory was incorporated to the Yogyakarta Regency. On 8 April 1945, Sleman's status as a Regency was restored by Hamengkubuwono IX. 15 May has been designated by the government as Sleman's anniversary.

=== Post-Incorporation ===
Sleman was incorporated on 8 August 1950 with the passing of the Law of the Republic of Indonesia Number 15 1950 about the Creation of Regencies within the Special Region of Yogyakarta.

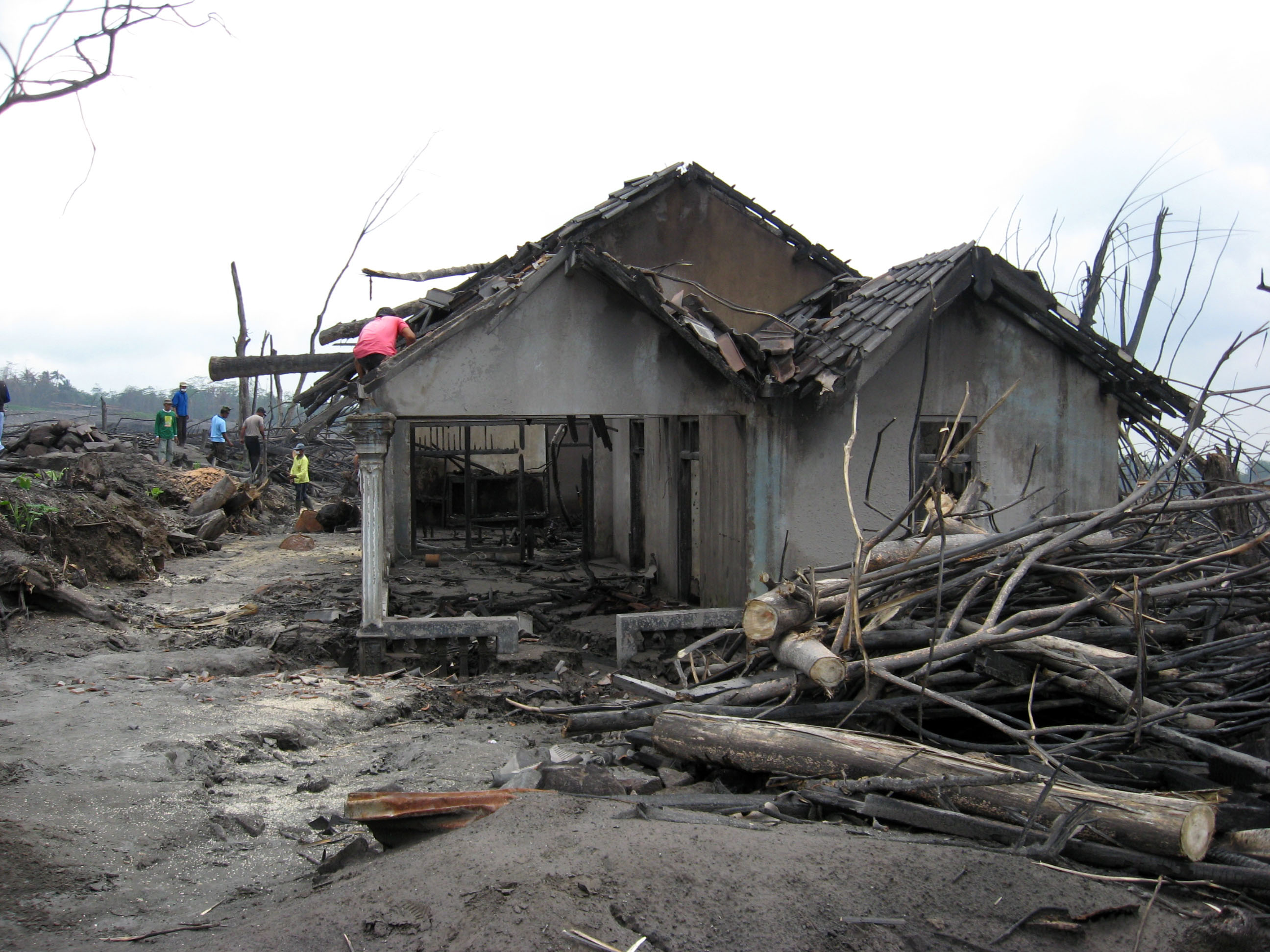
Destroyed house in Cangkringan District after the 2010 eruptions of Mount Merapi

In 2010, numerous eruptions of Mount Merapi and lahar flows afterwards killed 353 people and caused over Rp. 5.5 trillion (US$ 610 million) in damages.

== Geography ==
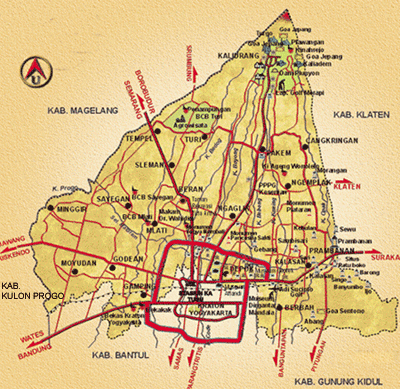
A map of Sleman, in Indonesian

Sleman Regency is located in the north of Yogyakarta Special Region, between the city of Yogyakarta to the south, and the Magelang Regency and Klaten Regency (of Central Java Province) to the northwest and northeast respectively. The northern part is roughly triangular, sloping downhill from Mount Merapi at the northern apex, and is bordered by Central Java Province to the west, north and east. The southern part is dominated by the suburbs of the city of Yogyakarta, notably the densely populated districts of Gamping, Mlati and Depok, and is bordered by the remaining three regencies of the Special Region - Kulon Progo, Bantul, and Gunung Kidul, as well as the city of Yogyakarta to the south.

== Administrative districts ==
Sleman Regency is divided into seventeen administrative districts (kapanewon), tabulated below with their areas and their populations at the 2010 Census and the 2020 Census, together with the official estimates as of mid-2023. The table also includes the locations of the district administrative centres, the number of administrative villages (all classed as kalurahan) in each district, and its post code.

| Kode Wilayah | Name of District (kapanewon) | Area in km^{2} | Pop'n Census 2010 | Pop'n Census 2020 | Pop'n Estimate mid 2023 | Admin centre | No. of villages | Post code |
|---|---|---|---|---|---|---|---|---|
| 34.04.03 | Moyudan | 27.62 | 30,883 | 33,514 | 34,200 | Sumber Agung | 4 | 55563 |
| 34.04.04 | Minggir | 27.27 | 29,263 | 32,110 | 32,750 | Sendangagung | 5 | 55562 |
| 34.04.05 | Seyegan | 26.63 | 45,049 | 51,231 | 52,790 | Margomulyo | 5 | 55561 |
| 34.04.02 | Godean | 26.84 | 65,890 | 72,255 | 73,670 | Sidoagung | 7 | 55264 |
| 34.04.01 | Gamping | 29.25 | 96,720 | 103,192 | 105,810 | Ambarketawang | 5 | 55291, 55592, 55293 - 55295 |
| 34.04.06 | Mlati | 28.52 | 101,031 | 100,524 | 103,930 | Tlogoadi | 5 | 55284 - 55288 |
| 34.04.07 | Depok | 35.55 | 181,490 | 131,005 | 134,920 | Caturtunggal | 3 | 55281 - 55283 |
| 34.04.08 | Berbah | 22.99 | 50,787 | 59,004 | 61,180 | Tegaltirto | 4 | 55573 |
| 34.04.09 | Prambanan | 41.35 | 46,857 | 53,113 | 54,680 | Bokoharjo | 6 | 55572 |
| 34.04.10 | Kalasan | 35.84 | 76,158 | 86,163 | 88,650 | Tirtomartani | 4 | 55571 |
| 34.04.11 | Ngemplak | 35.71 | 58,950 | 67,555 | 69,770 | Widodomartani | 5 | 55584 |
| 34.04.12 | Ngaglik | 38.52 | 101,887 | 105,612 | 109,170 | Sardonoharjo | 6 | 55581 |
| 34.04.13 | Sleman (district) | 31.32 | 62,762 | 71,888 | 74,230 | Triharjo | 5 | 55511 - 55515 |
| 34.04.14 | Tempel | 32.49 | 49,312 | 53,628 | 54,550 | Lumbungerjo | 8 | 55552 |
| 34.04.15 | Turi | 43.09 | 33,101 | 36,559 | 37,350 | Wonokerto | 4 | 55551 |
| 34.04.16 | Pakem | 43.84 | 34,669 | 37,320 | 37,850 | Pakembinangun | 5 | 55582 |
| 34.04.17 | angkringan | 47.99 | 28,201 | 31,131 | 31,800 | Argomulyo | 5 | 55583 |
| Totals | | 574.82 | 1,093,110 | 1,125,804 | 1,157,292 | Sleman | 86 | |

== Climate ==
Sleman Regency features a tropical monsoon climate, with a lengthy wet season generally running from October until June and a short dry season that only covers the months of July, August and September. The Regency averages roughly 2200 mm of precipitation annually. Sleman experiences particularly heavy rainfall from November through April. Temperatures remain relatively constant throughout the course of the year, with average high temperatures at around 30 degrees Celsius and average lows at around 22 degrees Celsius. There is slight variation within Sleman Regency. The northern areas, near Mount Merapi, are much cooler due to the higher altitude. The southern area has nearly the same climate as Yogyakarta, due to their proximity.

Climate data for Sleman
| Month | Jan | Feb | Mar | Apr | May | Jun | Jul | Aug | Sep | Oct | Nov | Dec | Year |
|---|---|---|---|---|---|---|---|---|---|---|---|---|---|
| Mean daily maximum °C (°F) | 29 (84) | 29 (84) | 29 (85) | 31 (87) | 30 (86) | 30 (86) | 29 (85) | 30 (86) | 31 (87) | 31 (88) | 30 (86) | 29 (85) | 30 (86) |
| Mean daily minimum °C (°F) | 22 (72) | 22 (72) | 22 (72) | 22 (72) | 22 (72) | 21 (70) | 21 (69) | 21 (69) | 22 (71) | 22 (72) | 22 (72) | 22 (72) | 22 (71) |
| Average precipitation mm (inches) | 350 (13.8) | 330 (13.0) | 310 (12.2) | 210 (8.3) | 120 (4.7) | 80 (3.1) | 40 (1.6) | 20 (0.8) | 30 (1.2) | 90 (3.5) | 220 (8.7) | 340 (13.4) | 2,180 (85.8) |
Source: http://www.weatherbase.com/weather/weather.php3?s=35869&refer=&units=metric

== Economy ==
Sleman Regency is heavily agrarian. However, due to the expansion of Yogyakarta there are some areas that have been substantially urbanized, with malls, hotels, and supermarkets being built. Tourism is also being developed to take advantage of the numerous temples found in Sleman Regency, as well as Mount Merapi.

=== Agriculture ===
Due to ashfall from Mount Merapi and easy irrigation, the land in Sleman Regency is very fertile. The soil is thick, with a favourable moisture capacity level. As such, rice yields are considerably high. The area is also well known for its production of salak pondoh, which is also its official plant.

== Education ==
There are 29 universities that have campuses in Sleman Regency, including Sanata Dharma University, Atma Jaya University, Islamic University of Indonesia, Yogyakarta State University and Sunan Kalijaga Islamic University.

Sleman is the home of the first established state university in Indonesia, the Gadjah Mada University.

== Health facilities ==
Hospitals in Sleman Regency include:

- Dr. Sardjito General Public Hospital (state-owned, considered the largest hospital in Special Region of Yogyakarta)
- Gadjah Mada University Hospital
- JIH Hospital
- Sleman Regional Public Hospital, and others.

== Tourism ==
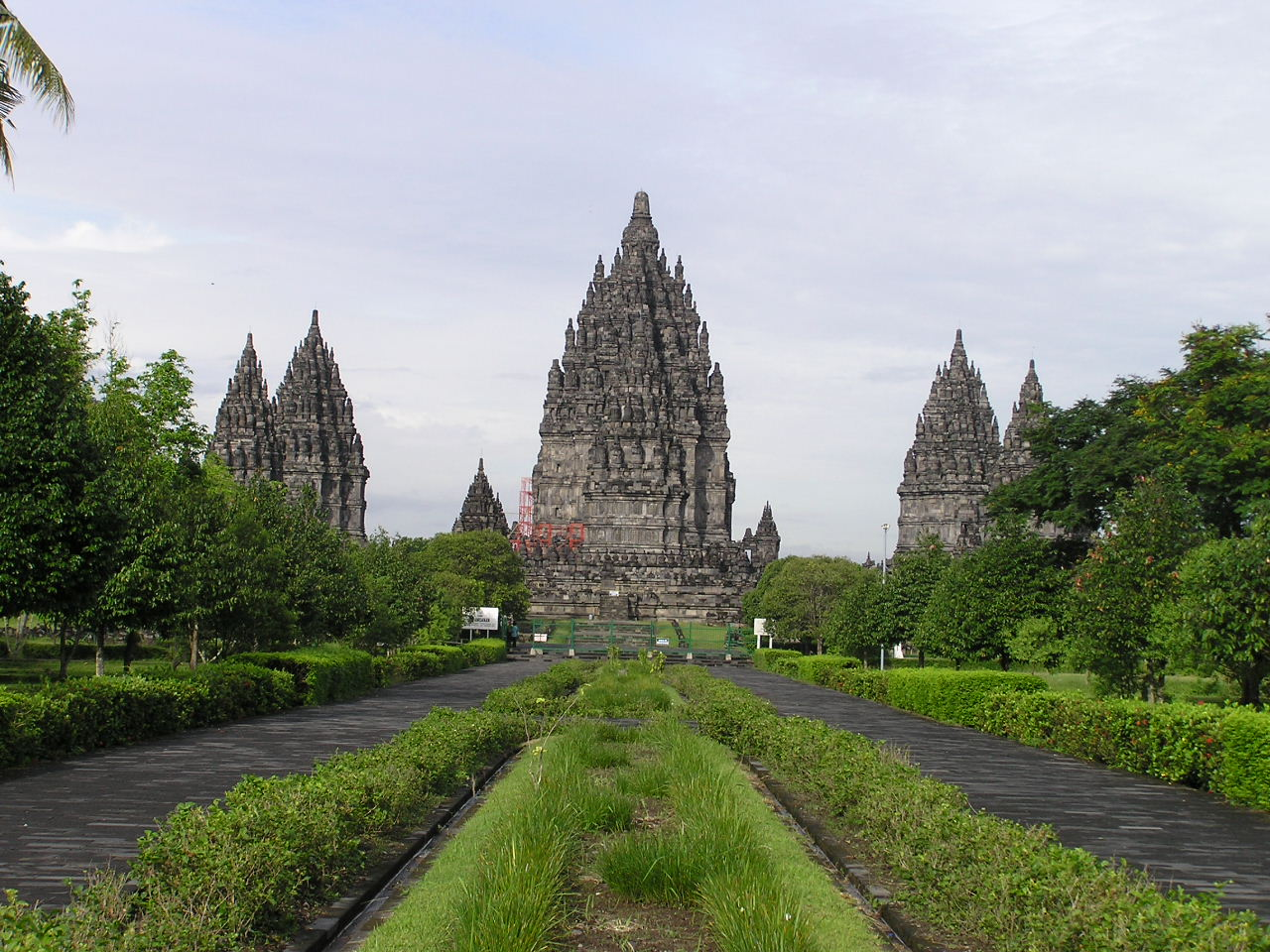
Prambanan, one of the most famous temples Indonesia, is located in Sleman

Sleman Regency is home to many temples, including Prambanan, Sari, Kalasan, and Ijo. As well as temples, there are ruins of an ancient palace, namely Ratu Boko. These temples and ruins, thought to be remnants of the Buddhist Sailendra dynasty and the Hindu Mataram kingdom, are all open to the public. However, Prambanan is the most popular for tourism, drawing thousands of local and foreign tourists each year.

Sleman Regency also has a number of tourist villages including Brayut and others.

Due in part to the scenic view at the foot of Mount Merapi, ecotourism has become common in Sleman Regency. One of the most common destinations is Kaliurang, a resort town located in the Pakem District.

Sleman Regency includes the Adisucipto Airport within its boundaries. There are numerous hotels in the regency, ranging from small homestays and inns to multi-star hotels. The higher-end, multi-star hotels are located mainly near the road between Yogyakarta and Surakarta, with homestays and inns scattered throughout the regency.

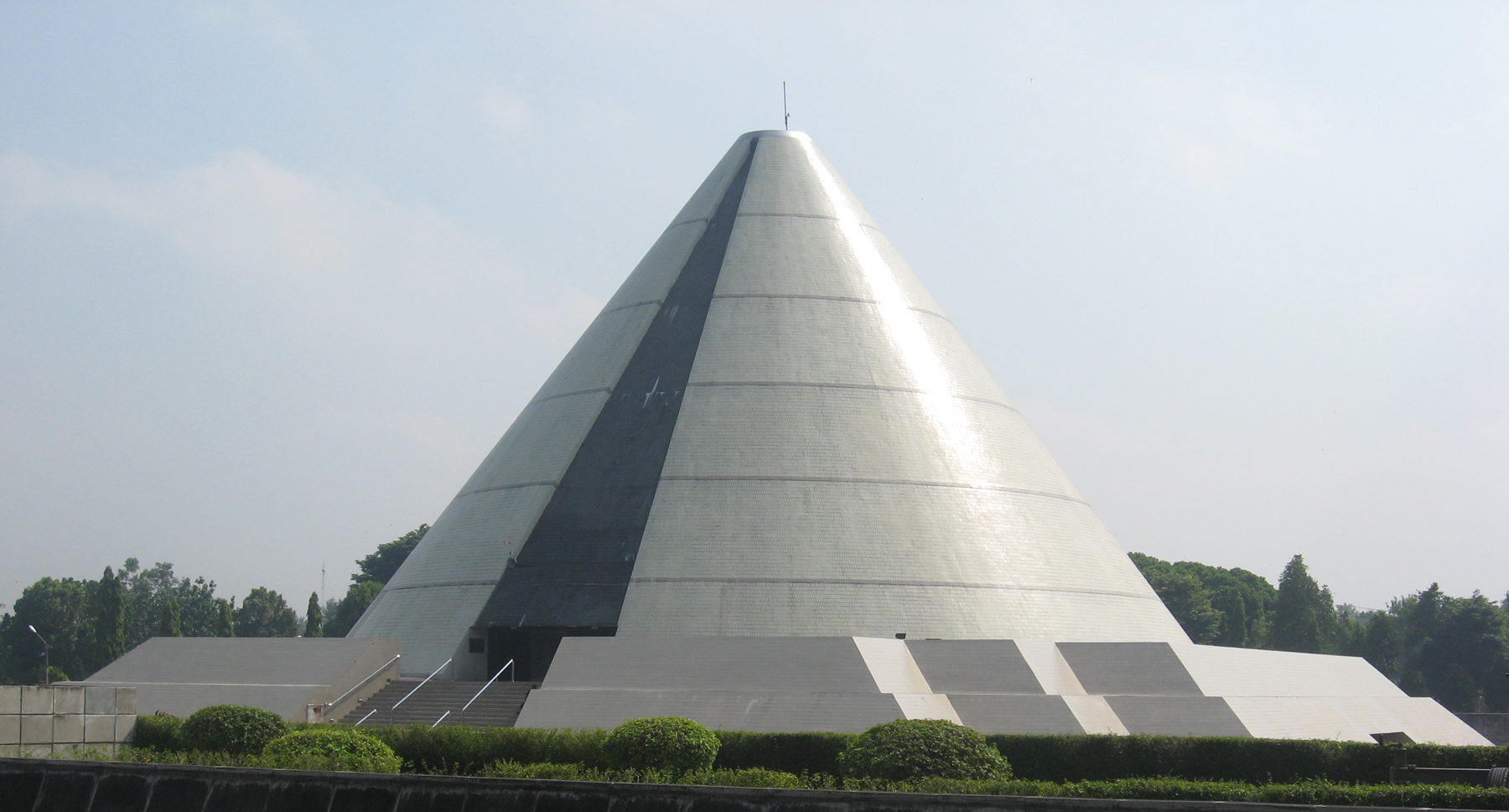
Monumen Jogja Kembali, also known as Monjali

Sleman is home to several museums including:

- Monumen Jogja Kembali (Monument to the Recapture of Yogyakarta), known colloquially as Monjali), which is dedicated to the Indonesian National Revolution and located in the Ngaglik District.
- Affandi Museum, located in Depok District, which is the former home of and hosts many works of famous Indonesian painter Affandi.
- Merapi Museum, which hosts exhibits pertaining to volcanology as a whole and Merapi in particular and is located within Pakem District.
- Museum Dirgantara Mandala, located within the Indonesian Air Force base near the airport. Exhibits include the history of the Indonesian Air Force as well as numerous planes, rockets, helicopters, and other military equipment.

After the 2010 eruptions of Mount Merapi, the areas affected have become disaster tourist attractions. Tourists come from around Indonesia to see the disaster area, either for leisure, to pay their respects, or reflection.

Luxury hotel Royal Ambarrukmo is located in Sleman.
