= Pakem =

District in Sleman Regency, Yogyakarta Province, Indonesia

Pakem (Javanese: ꦥꦏꦼꦩ꧀, romanized: Pakem) is a kapanewon (district) in Sleman Regency, Special Region of Yogyakarta Province, Indonesia.
