= Liyangan =

Archaeological site in Central Java, Indonesia

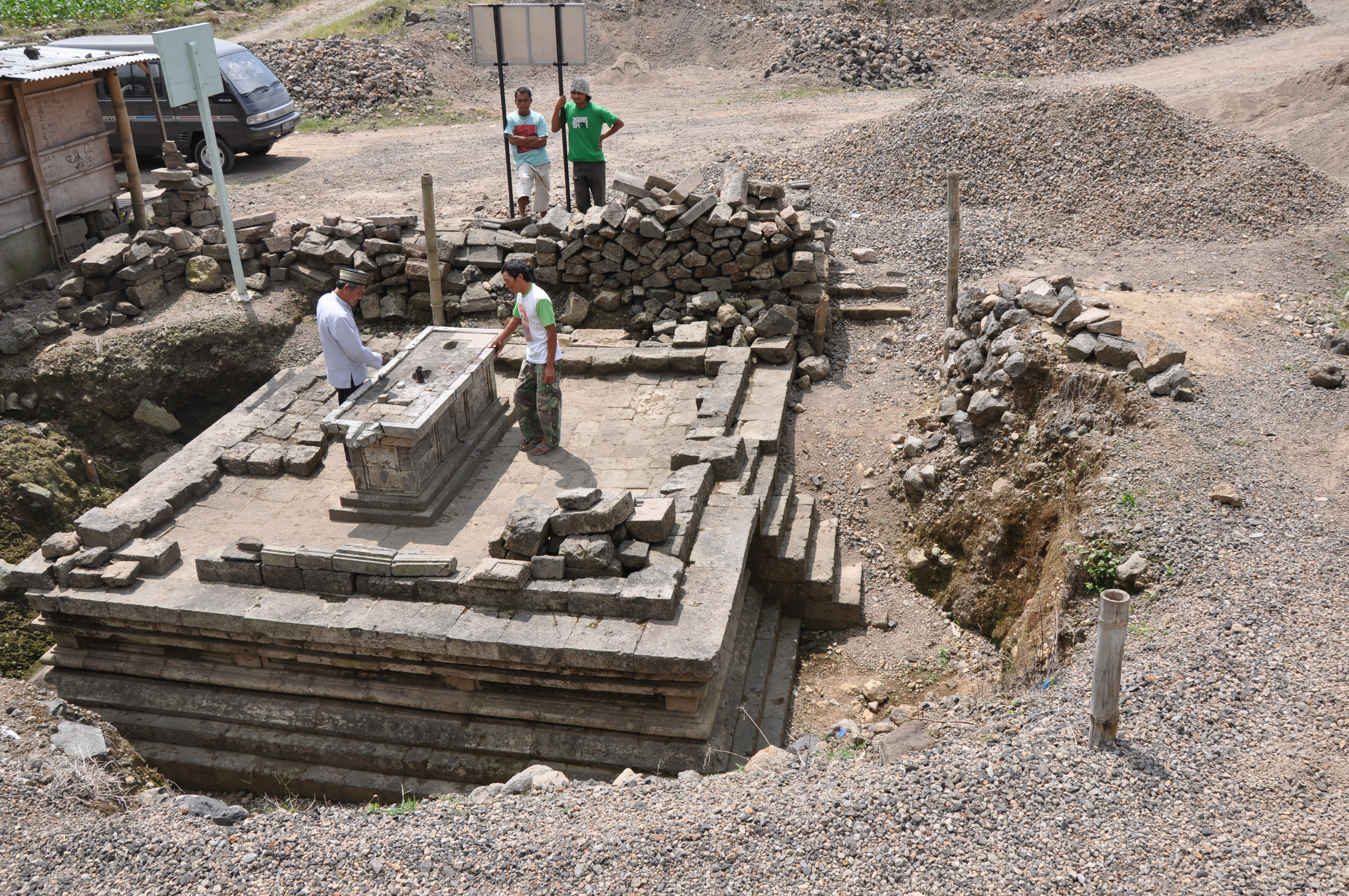
Liyangan temple during excavation.

Liyangan is an archeological site in Indonesia, consisting of Hindu temples (candi) and the ruins of an ancient settlement. It is located at the west of Mount Sundoro, near the small village of Liyangan (which is how the site got its name) in the Ngadirejo district of Temanggung Regency, Central Java. It was discovered in 2008.

== See also ==
- Candi of Indonesia
