= Berno =

Berno is a masculine given name and a surname. It may refer to:

- Bjørn (fl. 856–858), also known as Berno
- Berno of Cluny, also known as Berno of Baume (c. 850–925), first abbot of Cluny and saint
- Berno of Reichenau (c. 978–1048), German abbot, reformer of Gregorian chant
- Berno, Apostle of the Obotrites, also known as Berno of Amelungsborn or Berno, Bishop of Schwerin (died 1191), German monk and bishop
- Berno Kjeldsen, Danish 20th-21st century diplomat
- Peter Berno, Jesuit priest, one of the victims of the Cuncolim Massacre of 1583 in Portuguese Goa
- Tracy Berno, New Zealand academic, specialising in cross-cultural psychology and food, and author

== See also ==
- Burno, a surname
- Bernos (surname)
