= Coat of arms of Central Java =

- Adopted: 1965; 1985 (with motto)
- Crest: Golden five-pointed star
- Shield: Green amerta jug, silhouette of Borobudur Black, flanked by two Gold mountains, under three layers of blue waves with white edges, topped with 8-jointed Gold Sharp Bamboo.
- Supporters: 17 grains of rice on the left, cotton with a curly motif with 4 leaves, 5 fruits on the right, at the top of the red and white pennant.
- Compartment: jawa-tengah Black writing on a Gold base, supported by a Red base.
- Motto: prasetya ulah sakti bhakti praja Black color on a white ribbon.

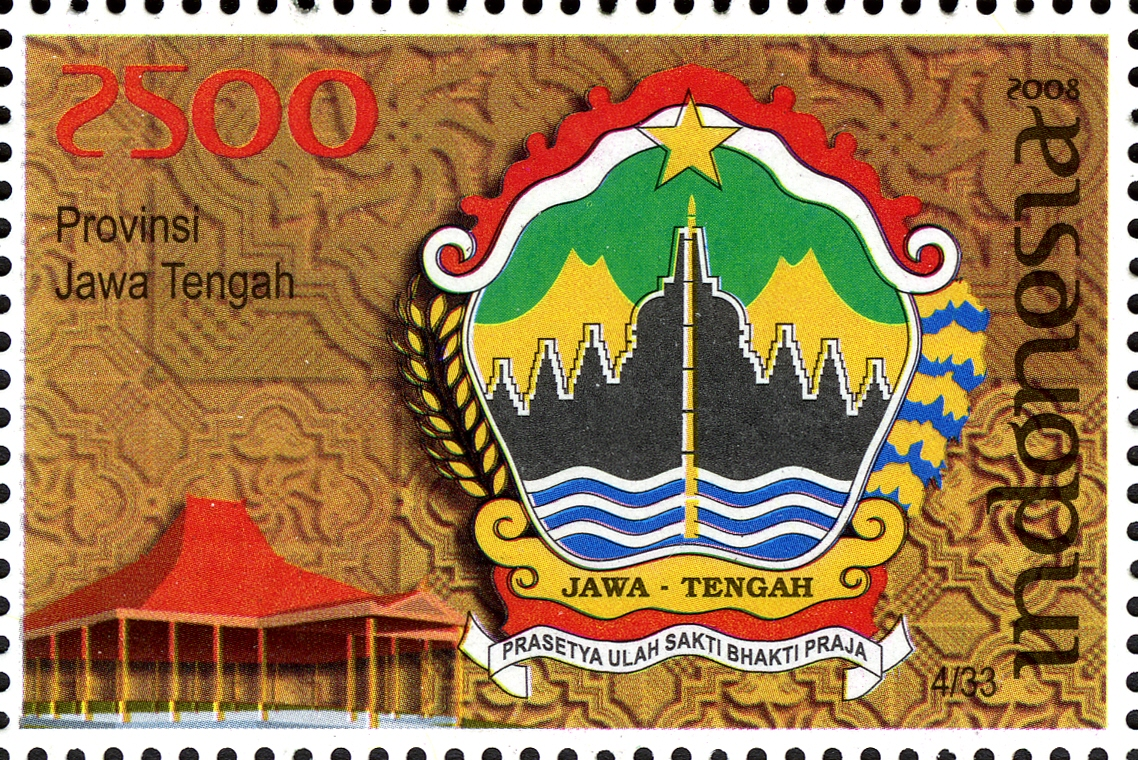
Stamp of Indonesia in 2008, showing the coat of arms of Central Java

The coat of arms of Central Java is in the form of a jug amrita (cupu manik) with a pentagonal base shape. Inside the symbol, there is a painting of the silhouette of the Borobudur temple, the sea and twin mountains, Bambu runcing, stars, rice and cotton. A motto is written at the bottom in Javanese: prasetya ulah sakti bhakti praja.

== Motto ==
At the bottom of the cupu manik there are golden yellow supporting tendrils, above which are the words "Central Java". Below the symbol, there is a white ribbon that says prasetya ulah sakti bhakti praja (Promise to work hard to build the nation and state).

== Meaning ==
The cupu manik amerta with a basic pentagonal shape, symbolizes Pancasila. A pointed bamboo with nine segments towering in the middle as a symbol of the struggle for independence. At the top there are curled tendrils in red and white — the colors of the Indonesian national flag — symbolizing the spirit of nationalism.

Borobudur Temple located in Magelang Regency, is the identity of Central Java; as a symbol of the cultural nobility and the greatness of Central Javanese history. The twin mountains have the meaning of unity between the people and the local government. The real twin mountains are in Central Java, including Mount Sindoro-Mount Sumbing and Mount Merapi-Mount Merbabu, so the twin mountains also describe the geographical and geological conditions of Central Java which has a number of volcanoes. Both the sea and the mountains symbolize life and living.

The five-pointed star in the middle of the top symbolizes God, while the rice and cotton that flank both sides of the symbol mean prosperity and well-being. This symbolizes the future of the people of Central Java, towards a just and prosperous society based on God.
