= Paschalis Soedita Hardjasoemarta =

Indonesian clergyman and bishop

Paschalis Soedita Hardjasoemarta M.S.C.
- Bishop of Purwokerto
- Church: Catholic Church
- Diocese: Diocese of Purwokerto
- In office: 17 December 1973 – 23 May 1999
- Predecessor: Willem Schoemaker
- Successor: Julianus Kemo Sunarko

Orders
- Ordination: 2 September 1956
- Consecration: 6 March 1974 by Justinus Darmojuwono

Personal details
- Born: 31 March 1929 Wonosobo, Governorate of Middle Java, Dutch East Indies, Dutch Empire
- Died: 23 May 1999 (aged 70)

Paschalis Soedita Hardjasoemarta (born 31 March 1929 in Wonosobo – 23 May 1999) was an Indonesian clergyman and bishop for the Roman Catholic Diocese of Purwokerto. He became ordained in 1956. He was appointed bishop in 1973. He died on 23 May 1999, at the age of 70.
