= Sikunang, Wonosobo Regency =

Sikunang
- Location in Central Java and Indonesia Sikunang (Indonesia)
- Coordinates: 7°14′15.3″S 109°53′52.4″E
- Country: Indonesia
- Province: Central Java
- Regency: Wonosobo Regency
- District: Kejajar District
- Elevation: 7,142 ft (2,177 m)

Population (2010)
  - Total: 2,114
- Time zone: UTC+7 (Indonesia Western Standard Time)

Sikunang is a village in Kejajar district, Wonosobo Regency in Central Java province, Indonesia. Its population is 2114.

== Climate ==
Sikunang has a subtropical highland climate (Cwb) with heavy to very heavy rainfall from October to May and moderate to little rainfall from June to September.

Climate data for Sikunang
Month	Jan	Feb	Mar	Apr	May	Jun	Jul	Aug	Sep	Oct	Nov	Dec	Year
Mean daily maximum °C (°F)	17.4 (63.3)	17.9 (64.2)	18.0 (64.4)	17.8 (64.0)	17.9 (64.2)	17.9 (64.2)	17.6 (63.7)	17.3 (63.1)	17.9 (64.2)	18.1 (64.6)	18.5 (65.3)	18.1 (64.6)	17.9 (64.2)
Daily mean °C (°F)	13.3 (55.9)	13.6 (56.5)	13.8 (56.8)	13.7 (56.7)	13.7 (56.7)	13.2 (55.8)	12.6 (54.7)	12.1 (53.8)	13.0 (55.4)	13.5 (56.3)	14.0 (57.2)	13.7 (56.7)	13.4 (56.0)
Mean daily minimum °C (°F)	9.3 (48.7)	9.4 (48.9)	9.7 (49.5)	9.7 (49.5)	9.5 (49.1)	8.6 (47.5)	7.7 (45.9)	6.9 (44.4)	8.1 (46.6)	8.9 (48.0)	9.6 (49.3)	9.4 (48.9)	8.9 (48.0)
Average rainfall mm (inches)	388 (15.3)	439 (17.3)	446 (17.6)	259 (10.2)	157 (6.2)	84 (3.3)	54 (2.1)	44 (1.7)	65 (2.6)	179 (7.0)	241 (9.5)	397 (15.6)	2,753 (108.4)
Source: Climate-Data.org
