= Wadaslintang, Wadaslintang, Wonosobo =

County in Wonosobo Municipality

Coordinates: 7°33′S 109°49′E

- Interactive map of Wadaslintang, Wadaslintang, Wonosobo

Population
  - Total: 4,570

Wadaslintang (Indonesian pronunciation: [wadasˈlin̪t̪aŋ]) is an administrative village in the Wadaslintang District, Wonosobo Regency, Central Java, Indonesia.

== Etymology ==
The word Wadaslintang is a compound of the words wadas, meaning "a kind of stone" and lintang, meaning "star".

== Division ==
Wadaslintang have 4 dusun (hamlets):

- Dusun Cangkring
- Dusun Dadapgede
- Dusun Paras
- Dusun Wadaslintang

== Population ==
According to the Central Agency on Statistics of Wonosobo, there are 4,570 inhabitants in Wadaslintang as of 2014.

== School ==
There are many schools in Wadaslintang including:

- Wadaslintang 1 Primary school (Sekolah Dasar 1 Wadaslintang)
- Wadaslintang 2 Primary school (Sekolah Dasar 2 Wadaslintang)
- Wadaslintang 3 Primary school (Sekolah Dasar 3 Wadaslintang)
- Hidayatussibyan Islamic primary school (Madrasah Ibtidaiyah Hidayatussibyan)
- Hidayatussibyan Islamic middle school (Madrasah Tsanawiyah Hidayatussibyan)
- Wadaslintang 1 Middle school
- Ma'arif High school
- Muhammadiyah High school

== Health facilities ==
- Wadaslintang 1 Community Health Centre.

== Religious facilities ==
The village hosts 6 mosques, 29 musallas, and 2 churches.

== Galleries ==
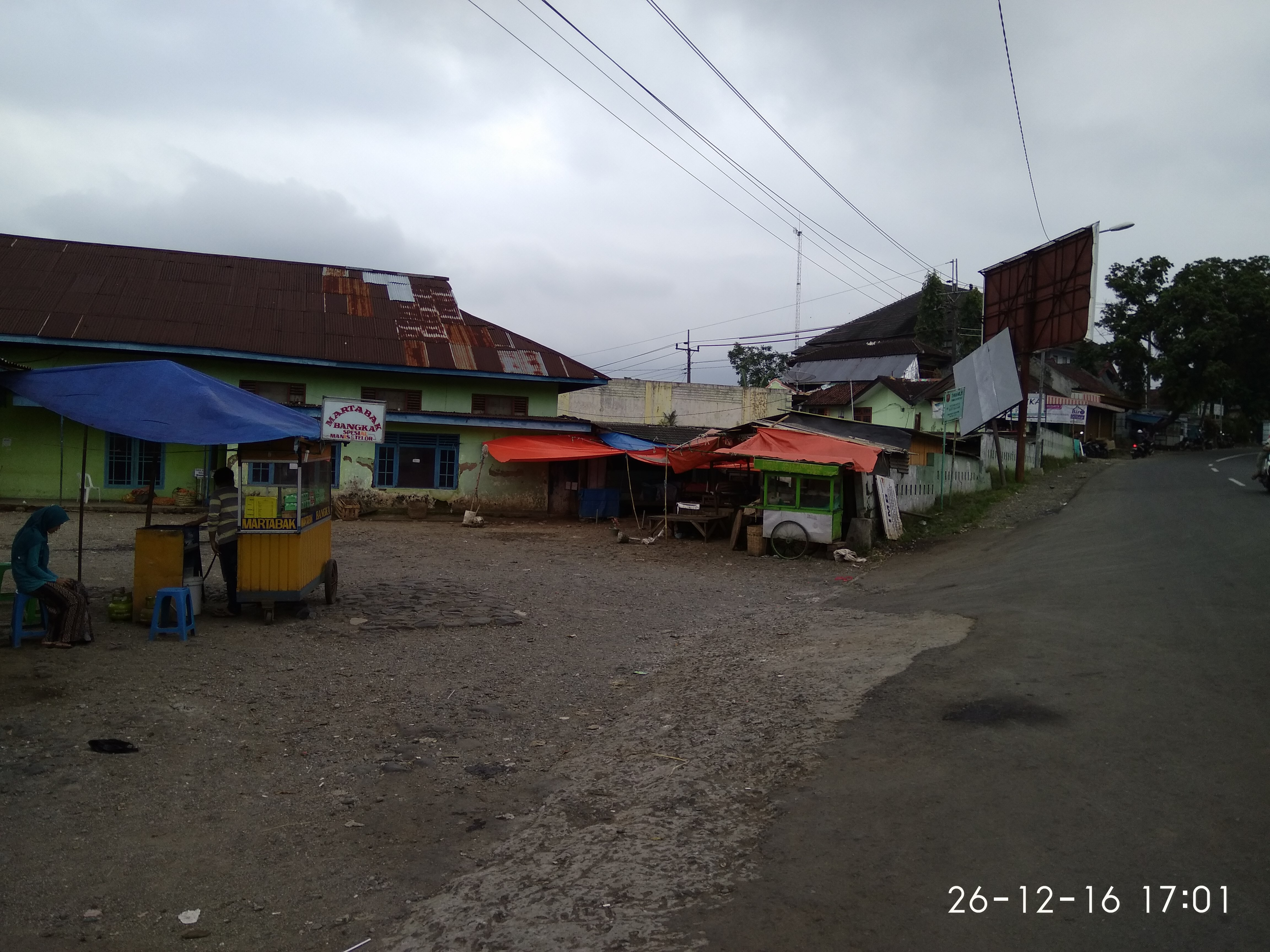
Bus Station in Wadaslintang

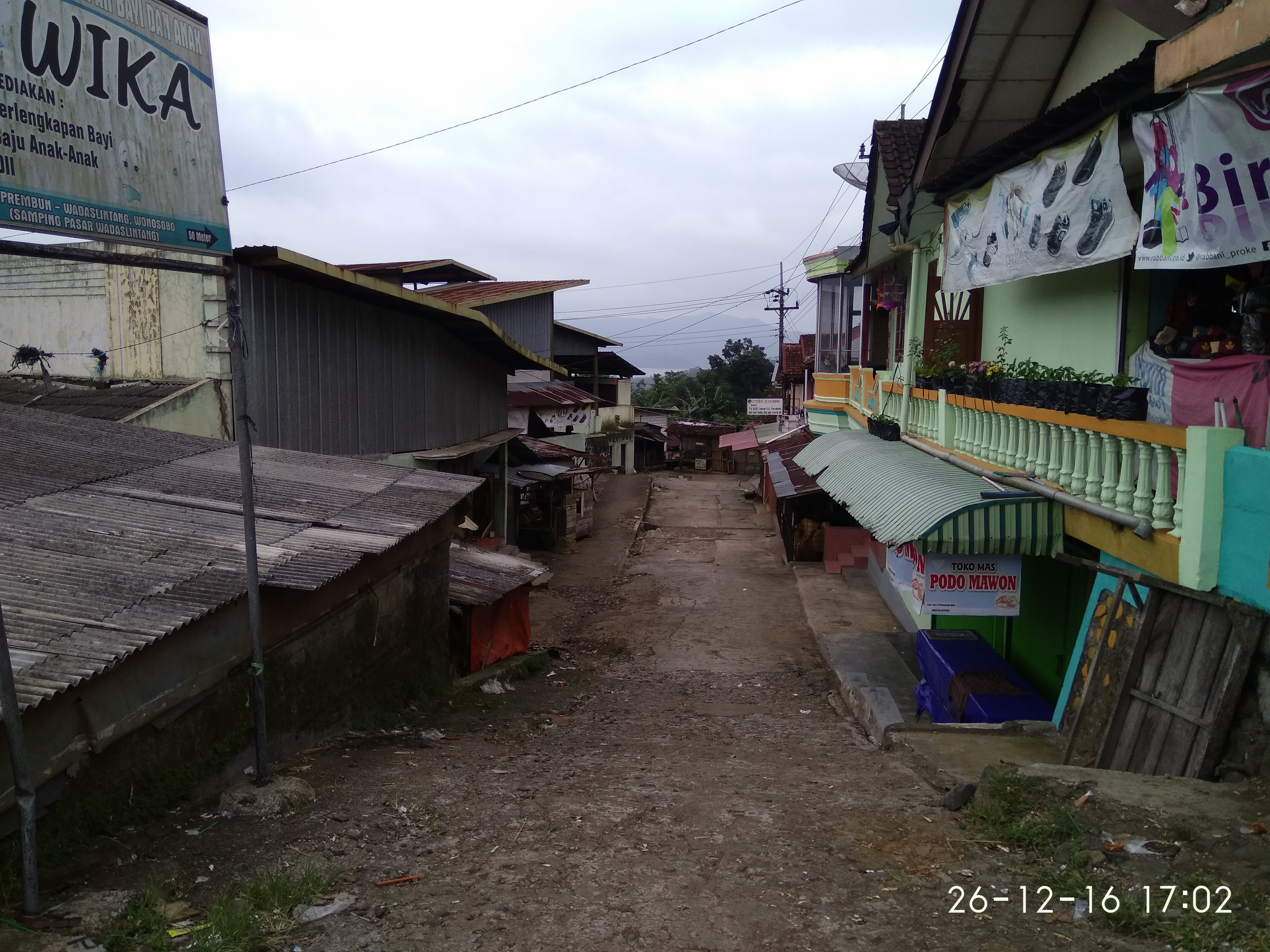
Traditional Market in Wadaslintang

Traffic Jam In Wadaslintang Street
