= Sigedang =

- Location in Central Java and Indonesia Sigedang (Indonesia)
- Coordinates: 7°16′27.3072″S 109°59′6.0036″E
- Country: Indonesia
- Province: Central Java
- Regency: Wonosobo Regency
- District: Kejajar District
- Elevation: 5,804 ft (1,769 m)

Population (2010)
  - Total: 2,916
- Time zone: UTC+7 (Western Indonesia Time)

Sigedang (Indonesian pronunciation: [siɡəˈdaŋ]) is a village in Kejajar District, Wonosobo Regency in Central Java Province. Its population is 2916.

== Climate ==
Sigedang has a subtropical highland climate (Cfb). It has moderate rainfall from June to September and heavy to very heavy rainfall from October to May.

Climate data for Sigedang
Month	Jan	Feb	Mar	Apr	May	Jun	Jul	Aug	Sep	Oct	Nov	Dec	Year
Mean daily maximum °C (°F)	19.7 (67.5)	20.1 (68.2)	20.4 (68.7)	20.2 (68.4)	20.4 (68.7)	20.4 (68.7)	20.1 (68.2)	20.1 (68.2)	20.5 (68.9)	20.8 (69.4)	20.9 (69.6)	20.4 (68.7)	20.3 (68.6)
Daily mean °C (°F)	15.7 (60.3)	15.9 (60.6)	16.3 (61.3)	16.1 (61.0)	16.2 (61.2)	15.7 (60.3)	15.2 (59.4)	14.9 (58.8)	15.5 (59.9)	16.1 (61.0)	16.5 (61.7)	16.1 (61.0)	15.9 (60.5)
Mean daily minimum °C (°F)	11.8 (53.2)	11.8 (53.2)	12.2 (54.0)	12.1 (53.8)	12.0 (53.6)	11.1 (52.0)	10.3 (50.5)	9.6 (49.3)	10.6 (51.1)	11.5 (52.7)	12.1 (53.8)	11.8 (53.2)	11.4 (52.5)
Average precipitation mm (inches)	442 (17.4)	433 (17.0)	453 (17.8)	290 (11.4)	204 (8.0)	94 (3.7)	66 (2.6)	53 (2.1)	73 (2.9)	183 (7.2)	277 (10.9)	424 (16.7)	2,992 (117.7)
Source: Climate-Data.org
