= Wadaslintang, Wonosobo =

Coordinates: 7.54831°S 109.80024°E

Wadaslintang District (formally Kecamatan Wadaslintang) is a District in Wonosobo Regency, Central Java Province Indonesia. Wadaslintang District has a postal code of 56365.

== Division ==
Wadaslintang District Map

Wadaslintang District has 17 villages (16 rural desa and the urban kelurahan of Wadaslintang):

1. Village Kalidadap
2. Village Ngalian
3. Village Gumelar
4. Village Somogede
5. Village Trimulyo
6. Village Tirip
7. Village Besuki
8. Village Plunjaran
9. Village Lancar
10. Village Panerusan
11. Village Kumejing
12. Village Karanganyar
13. Village Erorejo
14. Village Sumberejo
15. Village Kaligowong
16. Village Sumbersari
17. Administrative village Wadaslintang

== Population ==
According to Wonosobo Central Agency on Statistics, the populations of the villages of Wadaslintang District population at the official estimates as at mid 2021 were:

Village	Population mid 2021		
Village	Male	Female	Total
Kaligowong	2,652	2,618	5,270
Sumbersari	363	327	690
Sumberejo	896	885	1,781
Erorejo	904	884	1,788
Karanganyar	1,330	1,336	2,666
Panerusan	1,623	1,610	3,233
Wadaslintang	2,562	2,566	5,128
Plunjaran	1,183	1,191	2,374
Kumejing	1,478	1,379	2,857
Lancar	3,132	3,082	6,214
Somogede	2,278	2,275	4,553
Trimulyo	3,019	2,919	5,938
Tirip	2,675	2,601	5,276
Besuki	1,599	1,511	3,110
Gumelar	1,825	1,736	3,561
Ngalian	3,434	3,308	6,742
Kalidadap	1,317	1,283	2,600
Total	32,270	31,511	64,781

== Education Facility ==
Education facility in Wadaslintang District:

Facility	Total
Pre-school playgroup (Pendidikan Anak Usia Dini - PAUD)	25
Kindergarten (Taman Kanak-kanan - TK)	34
Primary school (Sekolah Dasar - SD)	40
Islamic Primary school (Madrasah Ibtidaiyah - MI)	11
Middle school (Sekolah Menengah Pertama - SMP)	11
Islamic Middle school (Madrasah Tsanawiyah - MTs)	5
SMA (Sekolah Menengah Atas)	2
SMK (Sekolah Menenngah Kejuruan)	3

== Galleries ==
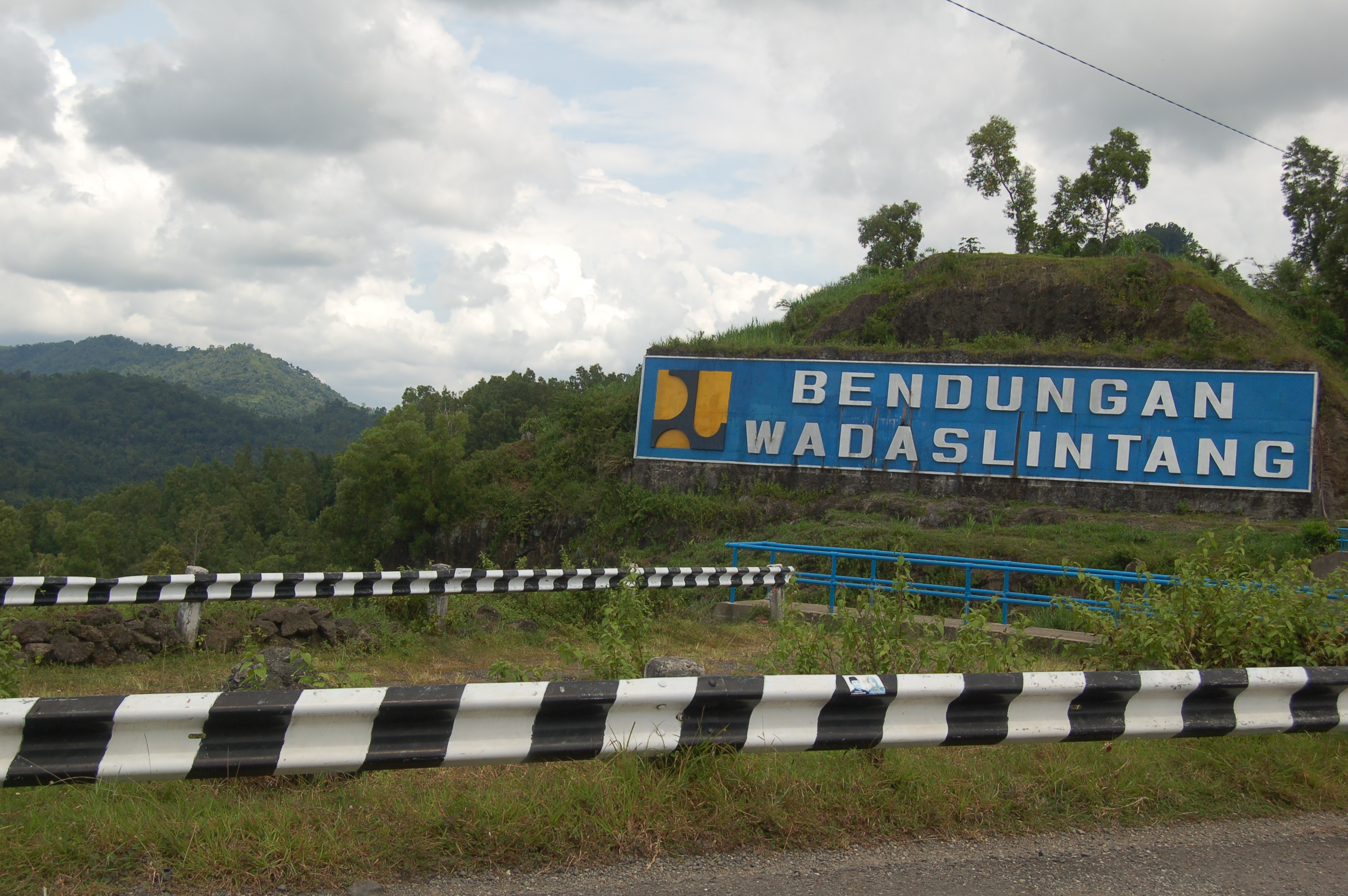
Wadaslintang Reservoir, one of tourist destination in Wadaslintang District

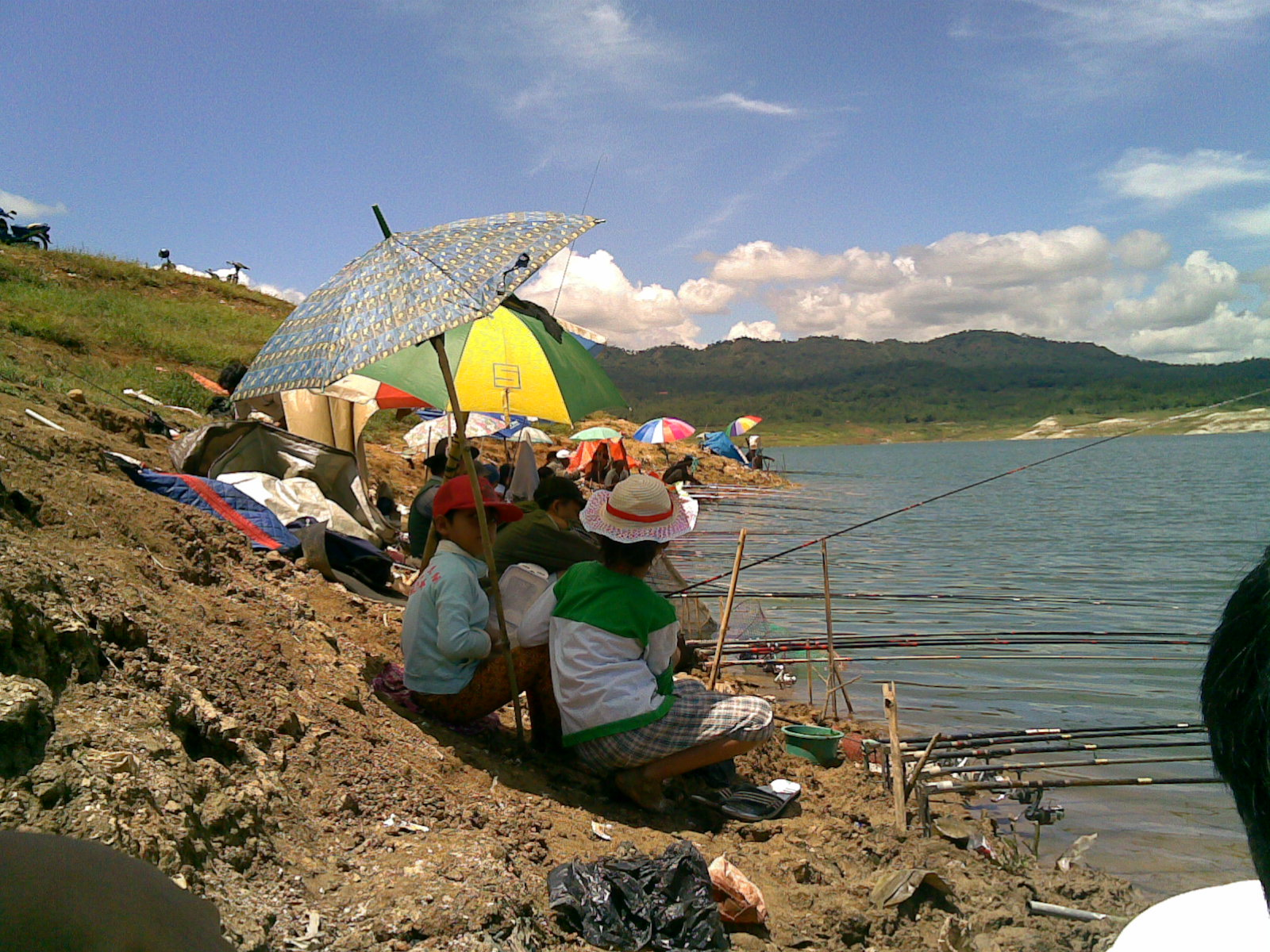
Fishing in Wadaslintang Reservoir

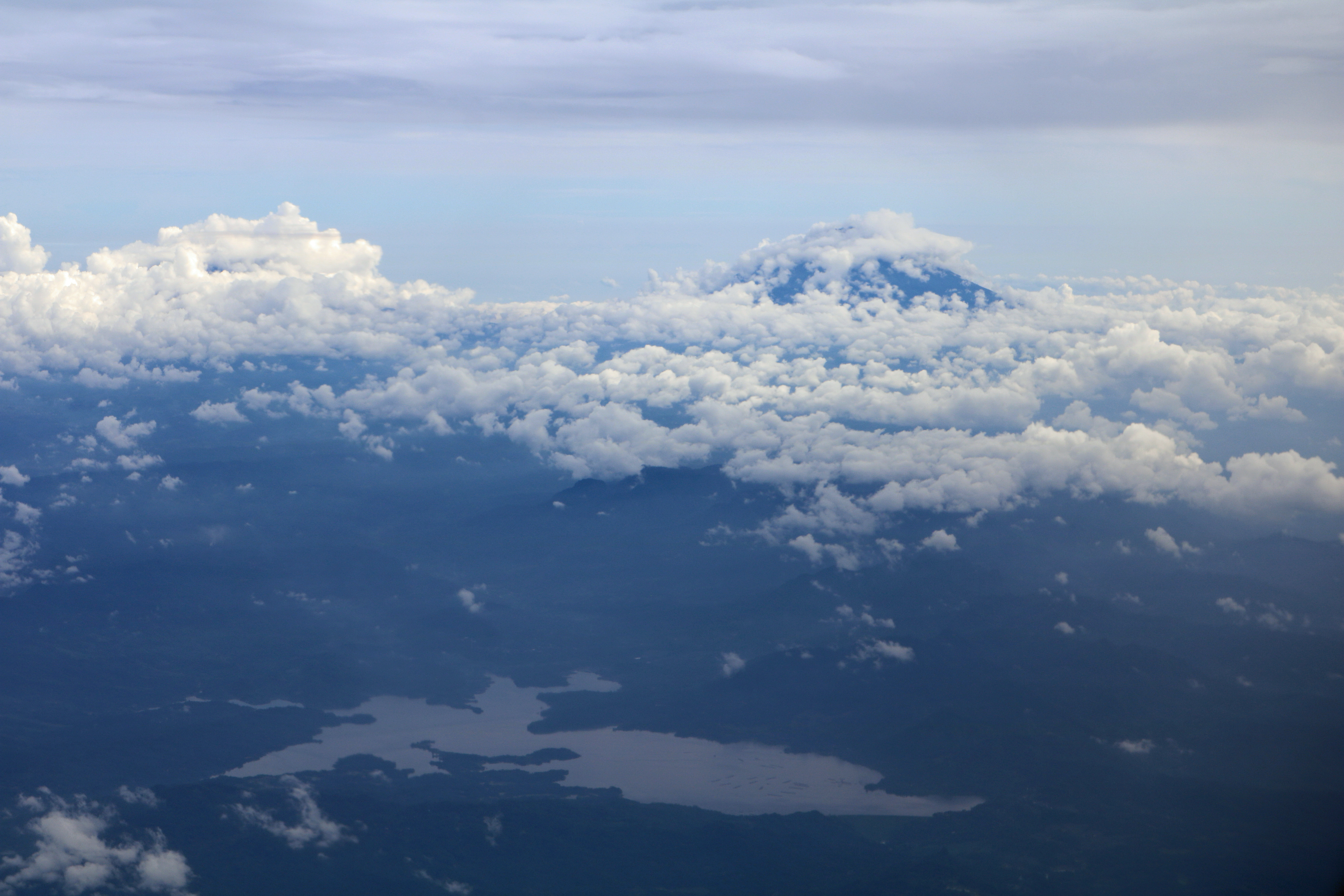
Wadaslintang Reservoir and Mount Sumbing
