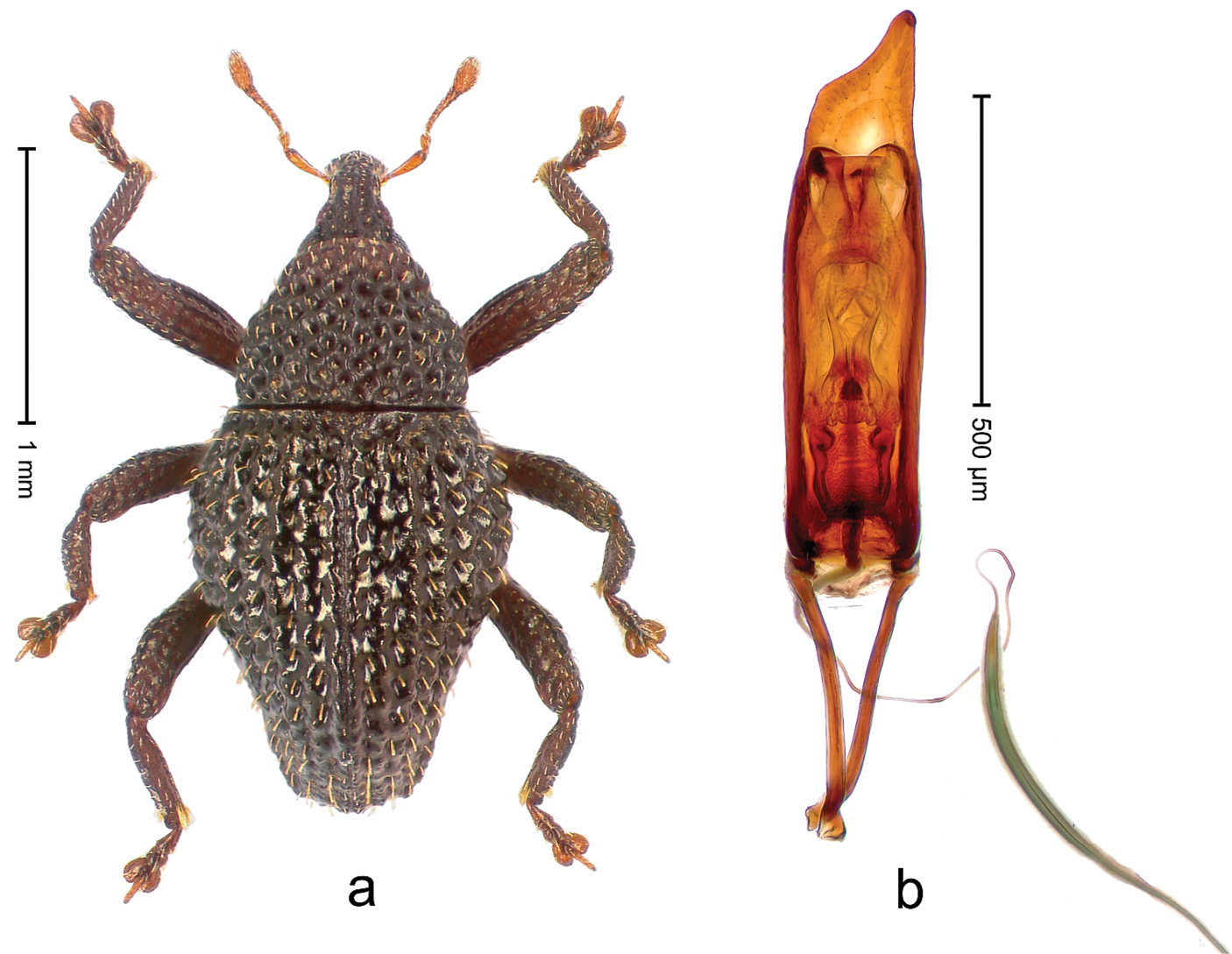

Scientific classification
- Kingdom: Animalia
- Phylum: Arthropoda
- Clade: Pancrustacea
- Class: Insecta
- Order: Coleoptera
- Suborder: Polyphaga
- Infraorder: Cucujiformia
- Family: Curculionidae
- Genus: Trigonopterus
- Species: T. diengensis

Binomial name
- Trigonopterus diengensis Riedel, 2014

= Trigonopterus diengensis =

Species of beetle

Trigonopterus diengensis is a species of flightless weevil in the genus Trigonopterus from Indonesia.

== Etymology ==
The specific name is derived from that of the type locality.

== Description ==
Individuals measure 1.92–2.36 mm in length. The body is slightly oval in shape. General coloration is black, with rust-colored legs and antennae.

== Range ==
The species is found around elevations of 1,115 metres (3,658 ft) on the Dieng Plateau in the Indonesian province of Central Java.
