= Temanggung Regency =

Regency in Central Java, Indonesia

Temanggung Regency Kabupaten Temanggung
- Regency

Other transcription(s)
  - Javanese: ꦏꦨꦸꦥꦠꦺꦤ꧀ꦠꦼꦩꦔ꧀ꦒꦸꦁ
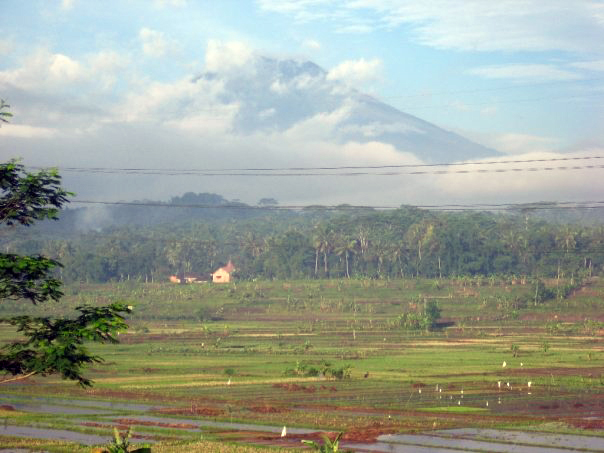
- Rice fields in Pringsurat, Temanggung Regency

- Coat of arms
- Motto: Swadaya Bhumi Phala (Raising the yields by self-subsistent)
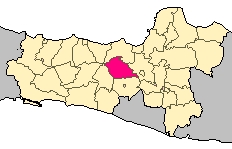
- Location within Central Java

- Location in Java and Indonesia Temanggung Regency (Indonesia)
- Coordinates: 7°18′S 110°10′E
- Country: Indonesia
- Region: Java
- Province: Central Java
- Named for: Temanggung Village
- Capital: Temanggung

Government
  - Body: Local Government of Temanggung Regency
  - Regent: Agus Setyawan
  - Vice Regent: Nadia Muna

Area
  - Total: 870.65 km^{2} (336.16 sq mi)

Population (mid 2025 estimate)
  - Total: 821,118
  - Density: 943.11/km^{2} (2,442.6/sq mi)
- Time zone: UTC+7 (IWST)
- Area code: (+62) 293
- Vehicle registration: AA
- Website: temanggungkab.go.id

Temanggung Regency (Indonesian: Kabupaten Temanggung) is an inland regency in the Central Java Province of Indonesia. It covers a land area of 870.65 km^{2} and had a population of 708,546 at the 2010 Census and 790,174 at the 2020 Census; the official estimate as of mid 2025 was 821,118 (comprising 412,030 males and 409,110 females). Its capital is the town of Temanggung.

All travellers going to the Dieng temple complex from Yogya or Semarang have to pass through this regency.

Temanggung Regency is famous for longan, a small sweet fruit that is harvested in January and February.

== Geography ==
Temanggung Regency is located on the volcanic Dieng Plateau with an average elevation between 500 and 1450 metres, although the more northern districts (kecamatan listed at the bottom end of the table below) lie off the plateau in the plains to the north. It is landlocked. The volcanoes Mount Sundoro and Mount Sumbing rise on its border with the Wonosobo Regency. Its major drainage system is the Progo River and its tributaries.

=== Borders ===
It is bordered by:

- Kendal Regency to the north
- Semarang Regency to the east
- Magelang Regency to the south
- Wonosobo Regency to the southwest

=== Administrative districts ===
Temanggung Regency is divided into the following twenty districts (kecamatan), listed below with their areas and their populations at the 2010 Census and the 2020 Census, together with the official estimates as at mid 2025. The table also includes the number of administrative villages in each district (totaling 266 rural desa and 23 urban kelurahan), and their postcodes.

Kode Wilayah	Name of District (kecamatan)	Area in km^{2}	Pop'n Census 2010	Pop'n Census 2020	Pop'n Estimate mid 2025	No. of villages	Post code
33.23.08	Parakan	22.23	49,024	53,322	54,739	16 ^{(a)}	56254
33.23.17	Kledung	32.21	24,280	27,652	29,026	13	56264
33.23.16	Bansari	22.54	21,583	23,973	24,961	13	56265
33.23.01	Bulu	43.04	44,068	48,745	50,449	19	56253
33.23.03	Temanggung (district)	33.39	76,037	82,929	85,244	25 ^{(b)}	56211 - 56218, 56221 - 56229
33.23.14	Tlogomulyo	24.84	21,198	23,270	23,995	12	56263
33.23.02	Tembarak	26.84	27,773	31,227	32,575	13	56261
33.23.15	Selopampang	17.29	17,672	20,244	21,310	12	56262
33.23.13	Kranggan	57.61	42,894	49,212	51,841	13 ^{(c)}	56271
33.23.04	Pringsurat	57.27	46,204	52,209	54,594	14	56272
33.23.05	Kaloran	63.92	39,749	45,064	47,199	14	56282
33.23.06	Kandangan	78.36	45,998	52,145	54,613	16	56281
33.23.07	Kedu	34.96	53,134	59,147	61,402	14	56252
33.23.09	Ngadirejo	53.31	50,168	56,142	58,433	20	56255
33.23.10	Jumo	29.32	27,212	29,837	30,749	13 ^{(d)}	56256
33.23.20	Gemawang	67.11	30,472	33,518	34,596	10	56283
33.23.12	Candiroto	59.94	29,554	32,509	33,555	14	56257
33.23.18	Bejen	68.84	18,837	21,399	22,435	14	56258
33.23.11	Tretep	33.65	19,051	21,229	22,050	11	56259
33.23.19	Wonoboyo	43.98	23,638	26,401	27,452	13	56266
	Totals	870.65	708,546	790,174	821,118	289	

Notes: (a) including two kelurahan - Parakan Wetan and Parakan Kauman. (b) comprising nineteen kelurahan (Banyuurip, Butuh, Giyanti, Jampirejo, Jampiroso, Jurang, Kebonsari, Kertosari, Kowangan, Madureso, Manding, Mungseng, Purworejo, Sidorejo, Temanggung I, Temanggung II, Tlogorejo, Walitelon Selatan and Walitelon Utara) and 6 desa. (c) including one kelurahan - Kranggan. (d) including one kelurahan - Manggong. All districts bear the same name as their administrative centres, except Parakan District (of which the centre is Parakan Wetan) and Temanggung District (of which the centre is Jampirejo).

=== Communities ===
The major towns of Temanggung Regency, aside from the capital of Temanggung, include Candiroto, Jumo, Kaloran, Kandangan, Kranggan, Muntung, Ngadirejo, Parakan, and Tretep.

== Climate ==
Temanggung has an elevation moderated tropical rainforest climate (Af) with moderate rainfall from June to September and heavy to very heavy rainfall from October to May. The following climate data is for the town of Temanggung.

Climate data for Temanggung
Month	Jan	Feb	Mar	Apr	May	Jun	Jul	Aug	Sep	Oct	Nov	Dec	Year
Mean daily maximum °C (°F)	26.9 (80.4)	27.0 (80.6)	27.5 (81.5)	27.9 (82.2)	28.2 (82.8)	28.3 (82.9)	28.3 (82.9)	28.8 (83.8)	29.0 (84.2)	29.1 (84.4)	28.0 (82.4)	27.0 (80.6)	28.0 (82.4)
Daily mean °C (°F)	22.9 (73.2)	22.9 (73.2)	23.3 (73.9)	23.5 (74.3)	23.8 (74.8)	23.3 (73.9)	23.0 (73.4)	23.2 (73.8)	23.6 (74.5)	24.1 (75.4)	23.6 (74.5)	22.8 (73.0)	23.3 (74.0)
Mean daily minimum °C (°F)	18.9 (66.0)	18.9 (66.0)	19.2 (66.6)	19.2 (66.6)	19.4 (66.9)	18.4 (65.1)	17.7 (63.9)	17.7 (63.9)	18.3 (64.9)	19.1 (66.4)	19.2 (66.6)	18.7 (65.7)	18.7 (65.7)
Average rainfall mm (inches)	343 (13.5)	310 (12.2)	353 (13.9)	251 (9.9)	161 (6.3)	90 (3.5)	74 (2.9)	62 (2.4)	89 (3.5)	150 (5.9)	239 (9.4)	331 (13.0)	2,453 (96.4)
Source: Climate-Data.org

== History ==
After World War II, Temanggung Regency was one of the areas in central Java where the Communist Party (PKI) had its rural strongholds. In the 21st century, Temanggung Regency provided a hideout for members of the Islamist Jemaah Islamiyah.

== Religion ==
Religion in Temanggung 2024
1. Islam (96.4%)
2. Protestantism (1.84%)
3. Buddhism (0.91%)
4. Roman Catholicism (0.76%)
5. Aliran Kepercayaan (0.04%)
6. Hinduism and Confucianism (0.01%)

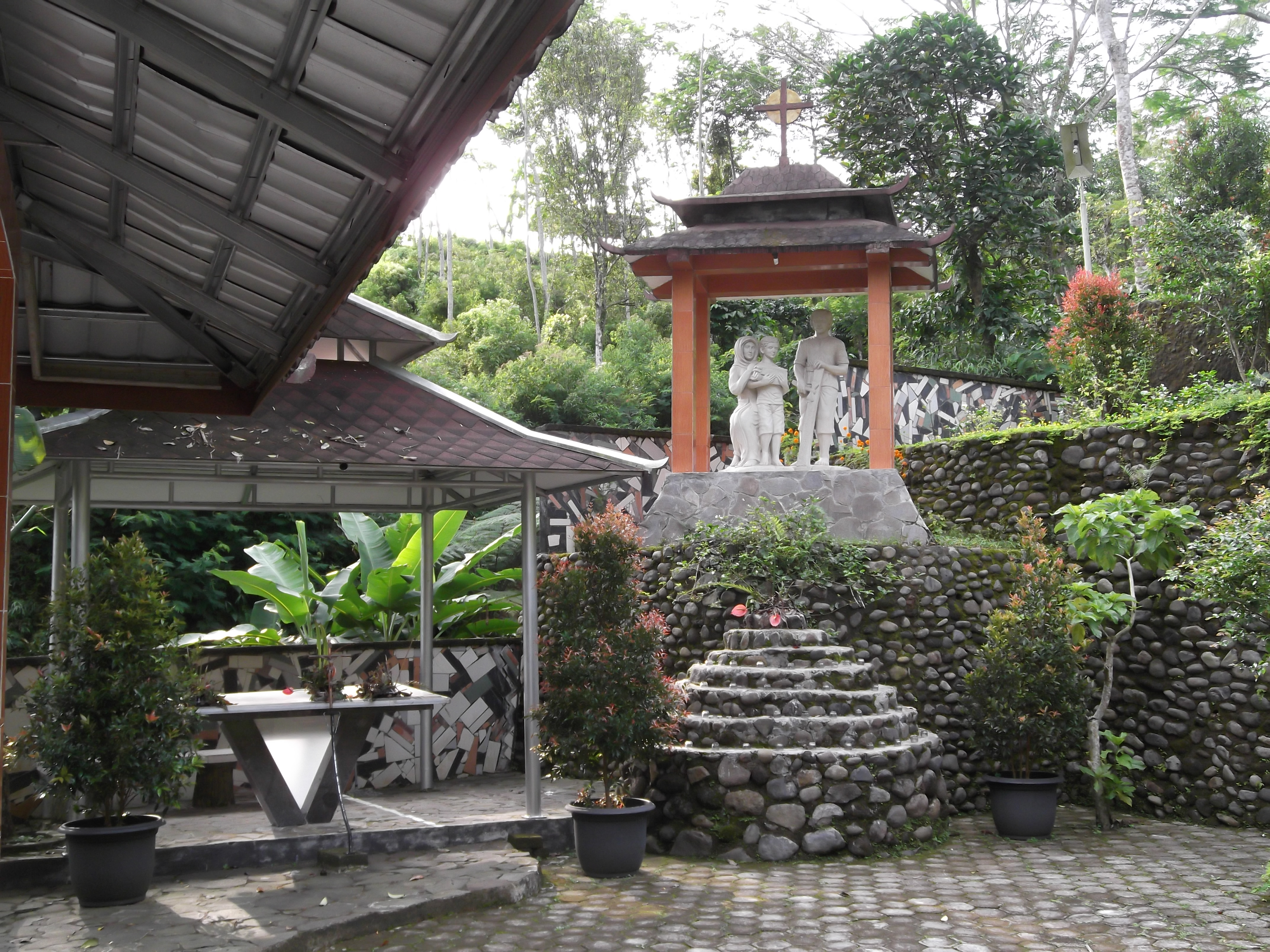
Altar for Mass celebration and statue of the Holy Family in the Saint Mary Rawaseneng Prayer Garden, in the Monastery of Saint Mary Rawaseneng complex

The majority of the population of the Temanggung Regency is Muslim. It was once predominantly Hindu for thousands of years. The oldest stone structure in Indonesia is found here; four temples of Shiva, and one of the trinity of Hinduism. Though there were 400, only four remain. Nonetheless, Temanggung Regency has a few Buddhist villages, particularly in the Kaloran District.

== Economy ==
The big cash crop in the Temanggung Regency is tobacco. Other cash crops include patchouli oil, honey and soy oil. The traditional herbal medicine, jamu, is the basis of local industry, as is the production of cigars. Silkworms are raised in the area around the town of Candiroto.

== Transportation ==
There is a rail line from Parakan through the town of Temanggung south to Magelang and on to the junction with the coastal rail lines; however, it is currently closed by the government due to operational costs.

== Culture and tourism ==
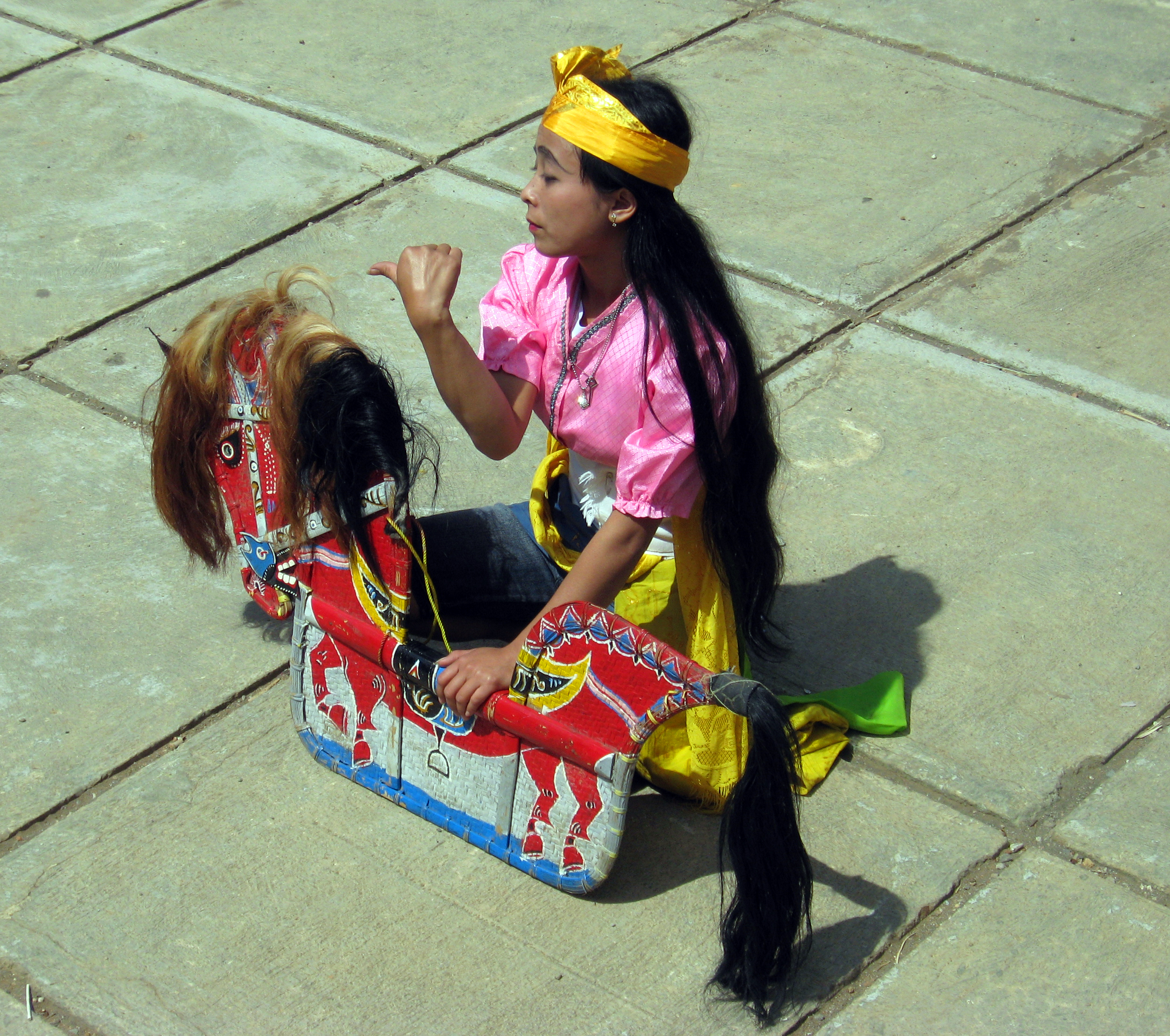
A female dancer performing Kuda Lumping in Cemoro Village, Temanggung

- Gondosuli Temple – A newly discovered temple located 13 km from the town of Temanggung.
- Kledung – a scenic pass between Mount Sumbing (3371 M) and Mount Sundoro (3133 M), it is crossed at around 2340 M. Located 20 km from Temanggung, it is a site for relaxing and mountaineering.
- Jumprit – a pool on the slope of Mount Sundoro, located 22 km from Temanggung. The water is cool and clean and, to some meditators, considered a holy place. During the Waisak (Vesakh) commemoration, the Buddhist monks take holy water from this place.
- Pringapus Temple- located near Jumprit. It was built by the Sanjaya kingdom (Hindus Mataram kingdom).
- Pakitan and Parakan – two small towns in the regency. Pakitan is situated between the hills, and has a cool climate.
- Meteorit – located in Wonotirto in Bulu District.
- Mbelang Sari Hills – a hill which borders on three different areas, located in Mblawong
- Water Fall Trocoh / Curug Trocoh – Located in Wonoboyo District.
