= Kjeldsen =

Kjeldsen (Danish pronunciation: [ˈkʰelˀsn̩]) is a surname. Notable people with the surname include:

- Anton Westerlin Kjeldsen (born 1994), Danish producer and songwriter
- Berno Kjeldsen, Danish diplomat
- Erik Kjeldsen (1890–1976), Danish cyclist
- Mark Kjeldsen (1953–1992), founder member of The Sinceros and former member of the London R&B band, The Strutters
- Michael Kjeldsen (born 1962), Danish badminton player
- Søren Kjeldsen (born 1975), Danish golfer
- Tinne Hoff Kjeldsen, Danish mathematician

== See also ==
- Royal Dansk, in 1990 it merged with another biscuit company, Kjeldsen
