= Wonosobo (town) =

- Town
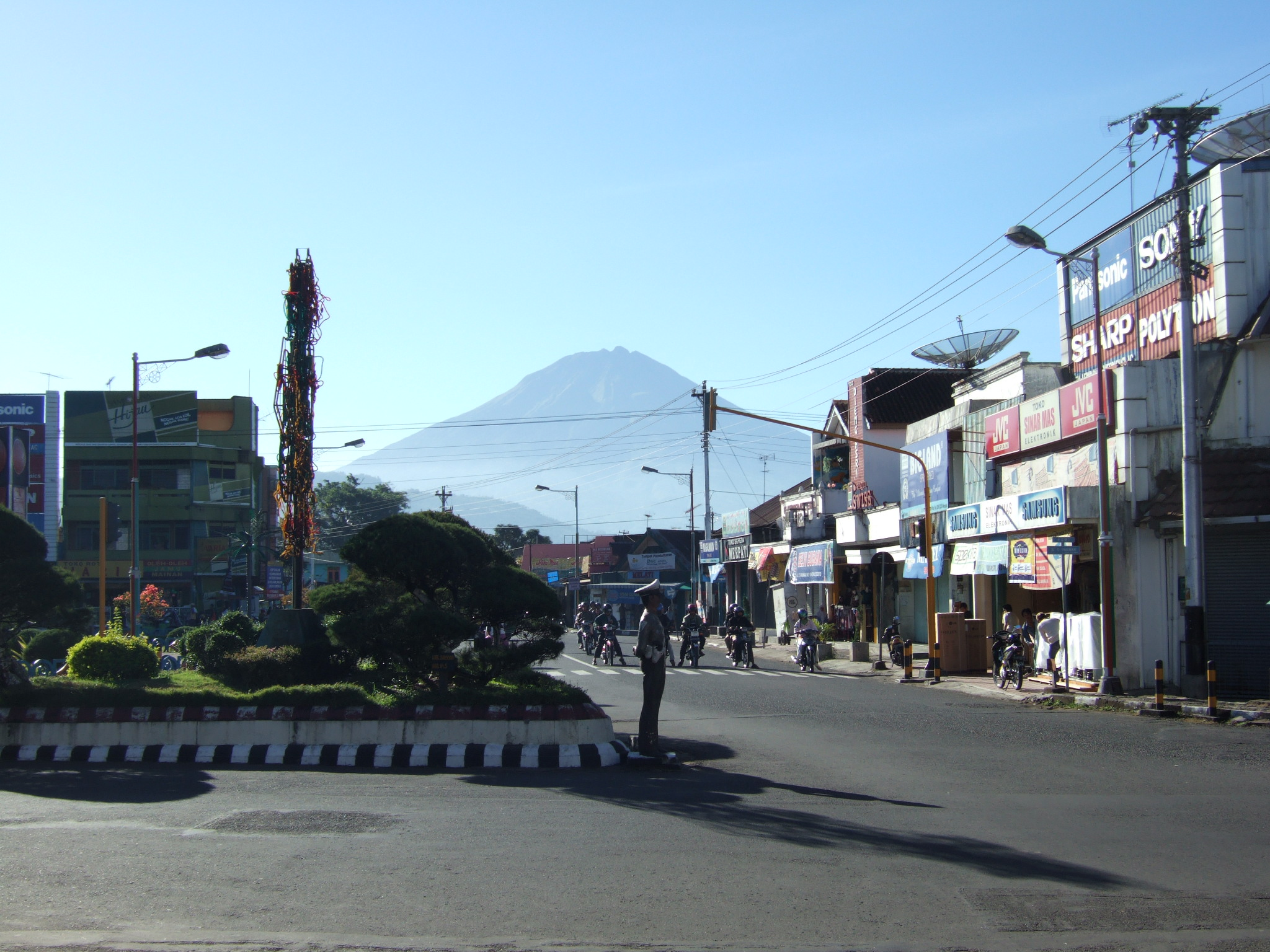
- Mount Sumbing, view from Wonosobo

- Location within Java Location within Indonesia
- Coordinates: 7.3598°S 109.91815°E
- Country: Indonesia
- Province: Central Java
- Regency: Wonosobo Regency
- Elevation: 796 m (2,612 ft)

Wonosobo is an administrative district (kecamatan) in Wonosobo Regency, part of Central Java Province of Indonesia. Wonosobo lies between mountains, Mount Sundoro and Mount Sumbing. It had 94,584 inhabitants in mid 2024. Wonosobo town itself is 772 metres above sea level.

The name of Wonosobo derived from Sanskrit Vanasabha, which means "gathering place in the forest."
