= Poncosari =

- Location of Poncosari in Indonesia
- Coordinates: 7°48′5″S 110°21′52″E
- Country: Indonesia
- Province: Yogyakarta Special Region
- Region: Bantul Regency

Area
  - Total: 11.8 km^{2} (4.6 sq mi)

Population (2010)
  - Total: 11,807
- Time zone: UTC+7 (WIB)
- Website: http://sustainableponcosari.wordpress.com

Poncosari is a coastal village on the Indian Ocean in Java, Indonesia. It lies in the Special Region of Yogyakarta, and is located in the southwest part of the sub-district, Srandakan, Bantul Regency. It is around 40 km from Yogyakarta. It is bordered by the Progo River on the west, the village Sanden in the east, and Trimurti to the north.

== Tourism ==
Poncosari is popular for its maritime tourism, drawing many Indonesians to its beaches, most notably Pantai Baru, or Pantai Pandansimo. Weekends are busy as tourists flock from Yogyakarta. Mid-week you will find yourself likely the only visitor, and can soak in the calm pace of life of the locals. The volcanic sand is a striking black, and the water is dangerous for swimming, with strong currents and large swell. However, there is a great deal of infrastructure for food and entertainment on the beach. There are countless Warung's (small eateries) with fresh seafood, and a variety of local wares for sale on the beach. The adventurous can also opt to hire ATVs to explore the beach. A visit will cost a modest 2,000 Rp (approximately 20c US) parking fee.

== Accommodation ==
There are camping sites on most of the developed beaches, and tents can be pitched here for a small fee.

== Economy ==
The population predominantly works in agriculture (corn, peanuts, rice etc.) and animal husbandry (chicken, cows, goat, shrimp farming, fishing). The community also mines sand from near the Progo River, and many are employed in this field.

== Sustainable village ==
Poncosari has invested in renewable energy infrastructure, including biogas, solar power and wind power. The village uses locally generated renewable energy to meet its energy needs. Guided tours of the renewable energy facilities may be available to visitors.
