= Mount Sindoro =

Active stratovolcano in Java, Indonesia

- Mount Sundoro
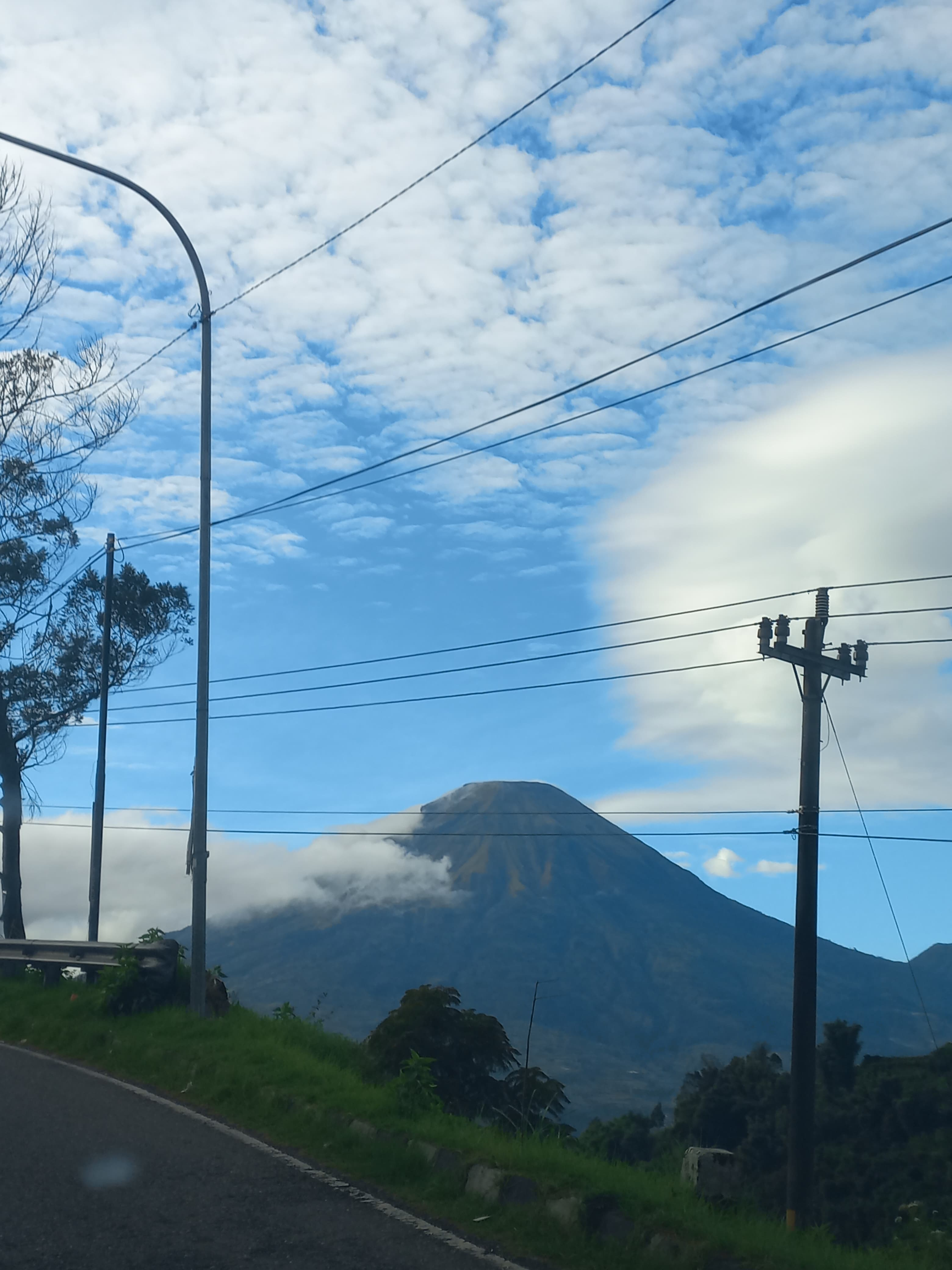
- Mount Sindoro is visible from the Wonosobo (town) - Dieng highway.

Highest point
- Elevation: 3,153 m (10,344 ft)
- Prominence: 1,747 m (5,732 ft)
- Listing: Ultra; Ribu
- Coordinates: 7°18′02.91″S 109°59′46.34″E

Geography
- Location within Java Location within Indonesia
- Location: Java, Indonesia
- Parent range: Sunda Arc

Geology
- Rock age: 659.000 years
- Mountain type: Stratovolcano
- Volcanic arc: Sunda Arc
- Last eruption: October to November 1971

Climbing
- Easiest route: Gubugklakah, Burno

Mount Sindoro, Mount Sindara or Mount Sundoro is a semi-active stratovolcano in Central Java, Indonesia. Parasitic craters and volcanic cones are found in the northwest-southern flanks; the largest is called Kembang. A small lava dome occupies the volcano's summit. Historical eruptions have been mostly mild to moderate.

The Sindoro mountain complex serves as the headwaters for the Progo river basin on the eastern slope and the Serayu river basin on the western slope. The boundary between the headwaters of these two river basins extends southeastward from the Sindoro mountain complex to the summit of Mount Sumbing. The headwaters of the Progo River basin on the eastern side flow through Temanggung Regency, while the headwaters of the Serayu River basin on the western side flow through Wonosobo Regency. Both of their mainstem ultimately discharge into the Indian Ocean, on the southern coast of Java, separated by a distance of approximately 125 kilometres (78 mi).

== Geography ==
Around Mount Sundoro lies Mount Sumbing to its southeast and the Dieng Volcanic Complex to its west. Administratively, Mount Sundoro is divided between 2 regencies: Temanggung on the east side and Wonosobo on the west side.

== Gallery ==
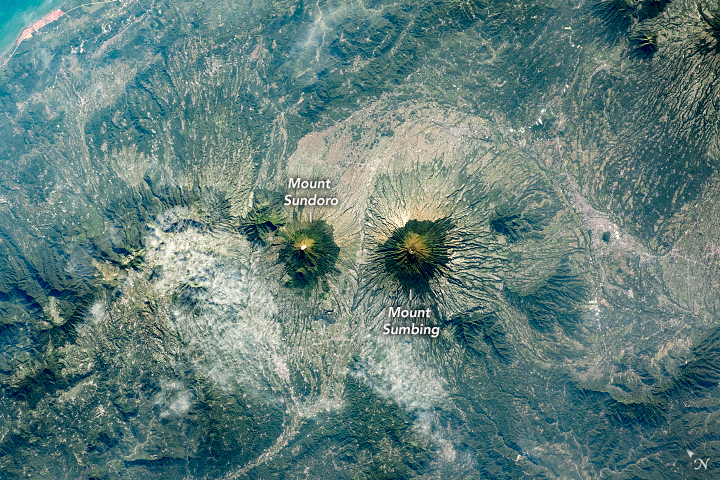
Mts Sundoro and Sumbing from ISS, 2021

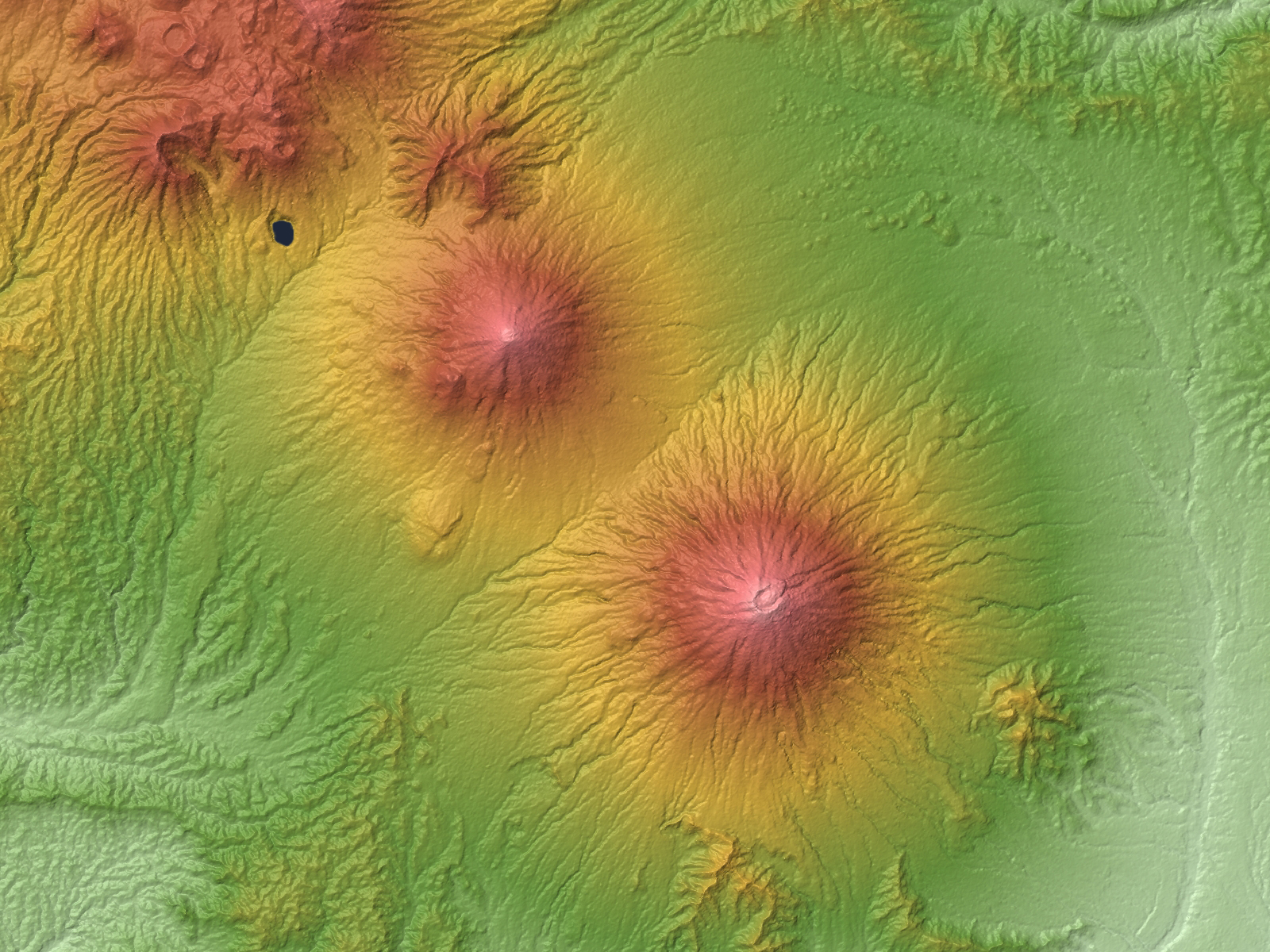
Mount Sindoro (left) and
Mount Sumbing (right)

== See also ==
- List of ultras of the Malay Archipelago
- List of volcanoes in Indonesia
- Serayu River
- Progo River
- Argo Sindoro
