= Progo River =

Progo River Sungai Progo, Kali Progo, Kali Prage, Kali Praga, Praga River
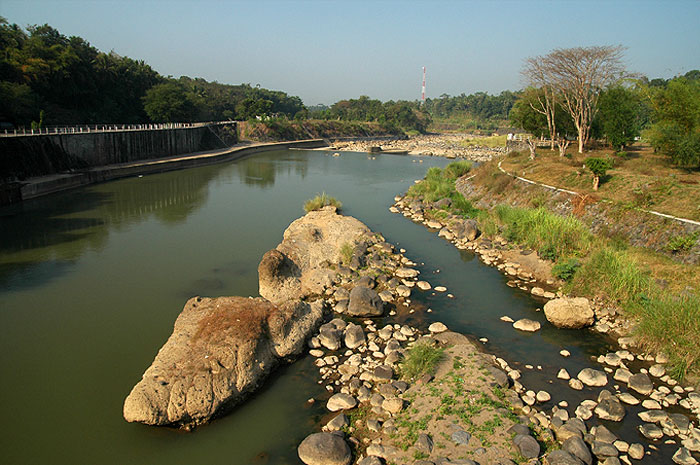
- Progo River in Yogyakarta

Location
- Country: Indonesia
- Province: Central Java

Physical characteristics
- Source: Mount Sundoro
- 2nd source: Mount Sumbing
- 3rd source: Mount Telomoyo
- 4th source: Mount Merbabu
- 5th source: Mount Merapi
- Mouth
  - location: Indian Ocean, Trisik Beach, Kulon Progo Regency, Yogyakarta,
  - coordinates: 7.98222°S 110.20278°E
- Basin size: 2,462 km^{2} (951 mi^{2})

Basin features
- River system: Progo basin (DAS230622)
- Basin Management Authority: BPDAS Serayu Opak Progo

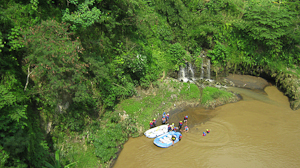
Rafting on the Progo River by the Kisik River Camp

The Progo River (Javanese: Kali Praga, ꦏꦭꦶꦥꦿꦒ, Javanese pronunciation: ['kali 'prɔgɔ]) is a river in southern central Java, Indonesia. The river passes through two provinces; Central Java and Yogyakarta Special Region. The source of the river is on the slopes of Mount Sindoro, Central Java.

== Hydrology ==
The river runs to the southeast through the city of Magelang, then through the historical Kedu Plain passing near the well known Borobudur, Mendut, and Pawon temples. Reaching the province of Yogyakarta the river forms a natural boundary between Sleman Regency, Kulon Progo Regency and Bantul Regency. The mouth of the river is located in Poncosari, at Trisik beach on the southern shore of Java facing Indian Ocean.

== Geography ==
The river flows in the southwest area of Java with predominantly tropical monsoon climate (designated as Am in the Köppen-Geiger climate classification). The annual average temperature in the area is 24 °C. The warmest month is January, when the average temperature is around 27 °C, and the coldest is July, at 23 °C. The average annual rainfall is 2970 mm. The wettest month is January, with an average of 537 mm rainfall, and the driest is September, with 22 mm rainfall.

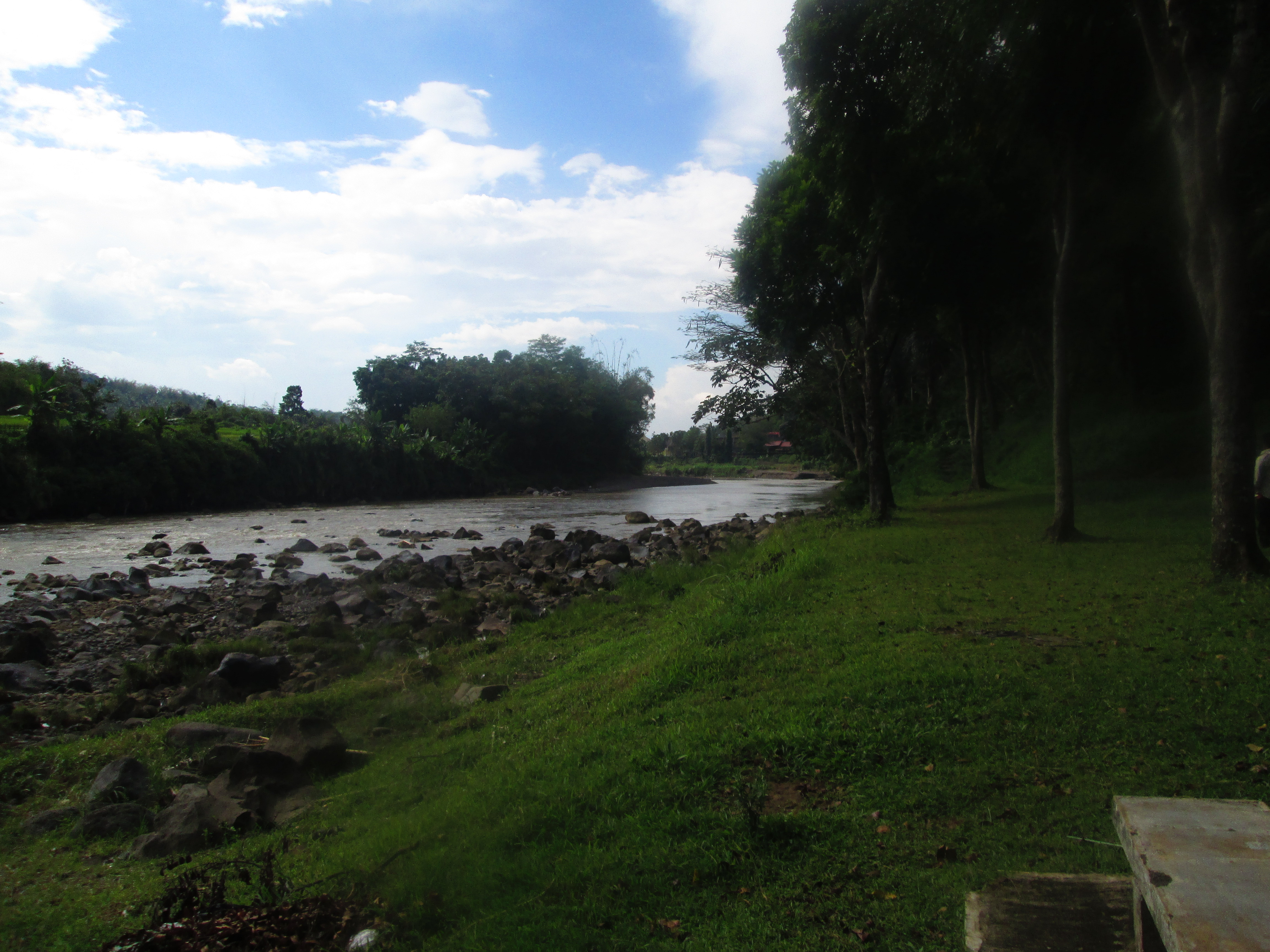
Progo River in the area of Taman Kyai Langgeng, Central Jawa.

== See also ==
- List of drainage basins of Indonesia
- List of rivers of Java
- List of rivers of Indonesia
- Progo
- Mbeling railway bridge
