= Bernos (surname) =

Bernos is a surname. Notable people with the surname include:

- Ching Bernos (born 1978), Filipina politician
- Joseph Bernos (born 1978), 21st century Filipino politician
- Joy Bernos (born 1977), Filipina politician

== See also ==
- Carmen Bernos de Gasztold (1919–1995), French poet
