= Burno =

Burno is a surname. Notable people with the surname include:

- Dwayne Burno (1970–2013), American jazz bassist
- Rashon Burno (born 1978), American basketball coach

== See also ==
- Berno, a list of people with the surname or given name
- Bernos, a list of people with the surname
- Burne
