= Berno Kjeldsen =

Danish diplomat

Berno Kjeldsen (13 June 1941 – 13 May 2013) was a Danish diplomat. He served as Danish Ambassador to Slovakia (2001–2005) and as Danish Ambassador to Croatia (2005–unknown). He was Deputy Permanent Representative to NATO 1984–1988. He served in the Danish Armed Forces 1964–1966, received an M.A. Political Science from Copenhagen University and attended the College of Europe in Bruges, Belgium 1969–1970 (William II of Orange promotion). He joined the Danish foreign service in 1972.
