= Dieng Plateau =

Mountain in Central Java, Indonesia

Coordinates: 7.2°S 109.9°E

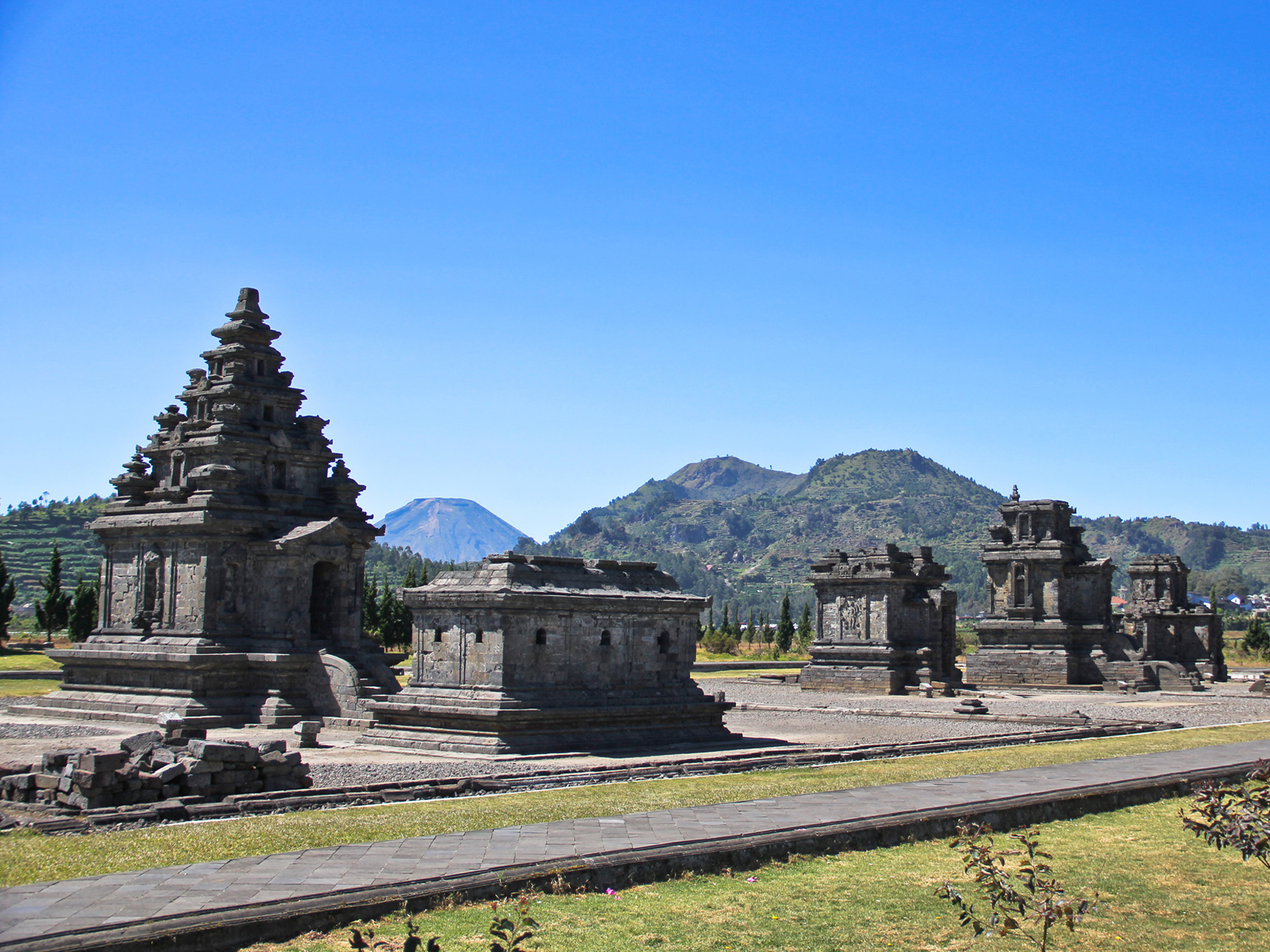
Dieng temple complex

The Dieng Plateau, often called simply Dieng (Javanese: ꦣꦶꦲꦾꦁ; Javanese pronunciation: [dijénɡ]) is a plateau in Central Java, Indonesia that forms the floor of the caldera complex on the Dieng Volcanic Complex. Administratively, this plateau is included in the territory of Banjarnegara Regency and Wonosobo Regency. It covers agricultural areas that have a subtropical climate with high levels of rainfall.

Dieng is surrounded by a series of mountains that stretch about 6 km (4 miles) from north to south and 14 km (9 miles) from west to east. Dieng is the highest plateau on the island of Java, having an average elevation of more than 2,100 meters above sea level.

== Etymology ==
Dieng is a name that comes from Old Javanese words: di means "place" and hyang means "ancestors" or "gods", literally "Dihyang" means "place of the ancestors" or "place where the gods reside". Dieng is a mountainous area, the ancient Javanese believed that the ancestors and gods resided in high places. This plateau is popularly known as "the land above the clouds", because the fertile region is surrounded by clouds and mist from the mountains.

=== In inscriptions ===
A number of Old Javanese inscriptions dating from the 9th century in Central Java mention the existence of Dieng. Based on the findings of the inscriptions, in his time this plateau functioned as a religious center and place of worship for Hinduism. These inscriptions include the Gunung Wule inscription (783 Śaka/861 AD), the Kapuhunan inscription (800 Śaka/878 AD) and the Wintang Mas II inscription (841 Śaka/919 AD) which were found in Wonosobo Regency; as well as the Indrakila inscription (804 Śaka/882 AD) found in Batang Regency.

The Gunung Wule inscription tells of someone who was ordered to maintain a sacred building in the Dihyang area; The Kapuhunan inscription mentions a holy place named Kailasa as a place of worship for Pitamaha (a designation of an honorable person) who has received support to carry out services for Sri Haricandana (the god Shiva), this inscription also mentions an area called Dihyang; the Wintang Mas II inscription contains the Sang Hyang Dharma at Wintang Mas who was a witness at Dihyang; and the Indrakila inscription contains the gift of sima land (civil administration) to Sang Hyang Dharma in Dihyang.

== History ==
=== Ancient Javanese period ===
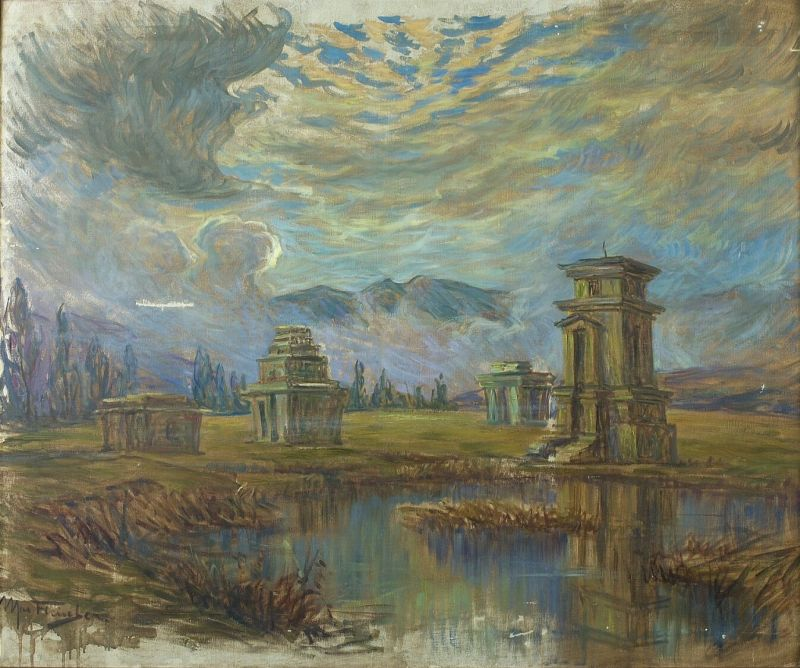
Painting of the Dieng temple complex by Max Fleischer, 1912.

Dieng is a plateau surrounded by volcanic complexes. At first this part of the plains was a former ancient lake that came from damming the lava that came out of the surrounding volcanic eruptions. The occurrence of the sedimentation process has an impact on the drying up of the entire lake area which gradually turns into plains.

The landscape of Dieng, which is a plateau, is related to land requirements and the concept of sacred space in Hindu and Buddhist cosmology. In its time this plain was a religious center and the site of the discovery of 400 temple buildings. It is not known exactly when the temples were built. The temples found at Dieng were found to have the oldest known stone structures in Java. Historically, the temples in Dieng date back to the Mataram kingdom era (8th century) and some South Indian architectural influences (6th century).

The choice of the location of the sacred building in Dieng during the ancient Javanese era was related to the worship of a god who was believed to reside in the mountain and as a place for rishis to perform their rituals of the cult of the gods. The location of the sacred building does not only consider the fertile location, but also pays attention to the god who is worshiped. Based on environmental conditions, the sacred buildings in Dieng are predominantly dedicated to the worship of Shiva. Archaeological remains in Dieng generally tend to be of a Shivaistic nature, this is shown in the many findings of phallus, yoni, statues and inscriptions indicating that Shiva is positioned as the main deity. The inscriptions found in Dieng contain tributes and praises to Shiva which are usually found at each opening of the inscription. This evidence confirms that the main deity worshiped in Dieng is Shiva.

Shiva is a god who always meditates because in this place there is fresh air that is little or not polluted by vehicle and industry pollution, and also the location is needed that is quiet and far from worldly things. These locations can be found at high altitudes because they encourage the creation of a sacred atmosphere. Dieng is a plateau that has many springs and is surrounded by mountains so that it is possible to become a sacred place. In Hindu cosmology, Shiva is a deity who inhabits a sacred mountain called Kailash. He is a god who is synonymous with mountains and has another name as Girisa or Girindra which means "god of the mountain".

In Javanese cosmology, mountain is a symbol of the cosmos where the earth and heaven meet. The mountain becomes a cosmological symbol in the sense of belief in the orderliness of the world and the universe. According to the Sthapatya Veda, the architecture of a sacred building is a reflection of the cosmos. This concept shows that the landscape of the Dieng plateau is a cosmic axis that connects the world with divine nature.

=== Colonial period ===
Panoramic painting of Dieng by Franz Wilhelm Junghuhn (c. 1853–1854).

Based on the records of Thomas Stamford Raffles in The History of Java, Dieng is the place where hundreds of ancient temples were found that had been submerged in water. Raffles at that time served as Governors of the Dutch East Indies (1811–1816) visited Dieng in 1815. In his report, he mentioned around 400 temples and archaeological sites in Dieng. This site is believed to have been built by a great civilization. In addition to the temple building, the remains of the Dharmasala, a residence complex for rishis, were also found. The function of this residence is of course very closely related to the building of the temple, especially in terms of maintenance and worship.

The first travel record that narrates about Dieng is the travel record of H.C. Cornelius who visited Dieng in 1814, earlier before Raffles' visit. In that note, Cornelius mentioned that in 1814 the Dieng plateau was submerged in water so that it looked like a fairly large lake. Armed with this report, in 1856, J. Kinsbergen visited Dieng and then reactivated the water channel called Gangsiran Aswatama by the local community. Kinsbergen also excavated and photographed several archaeological remains in Dieng, but his research reports have not been rediscovered until now.

Research in Dieng was then continued by H. L. Melville in 1911–1916. The results of this research prompted the Governor of the Dutch East Indies to issue a decree containing archaeological discoveries in the Dieng plateau, the number of which reached 104, consisting of structures left over from buildings, temples and loose finds. Now the remaining temple findings are divided into three regional blocks. The first block is the Dwarawati temple cluster, the second block is the Arjuna and Gatotkaca temple clusters, and the third block is the Bima temple cluster. Of the existing temple buildings, only a few buildings remain that can still be seen. The name of the temple is taken from the names of Javanese shadow puppets (Wayang Kulit) and Mahabharata characters.

== Climate ==
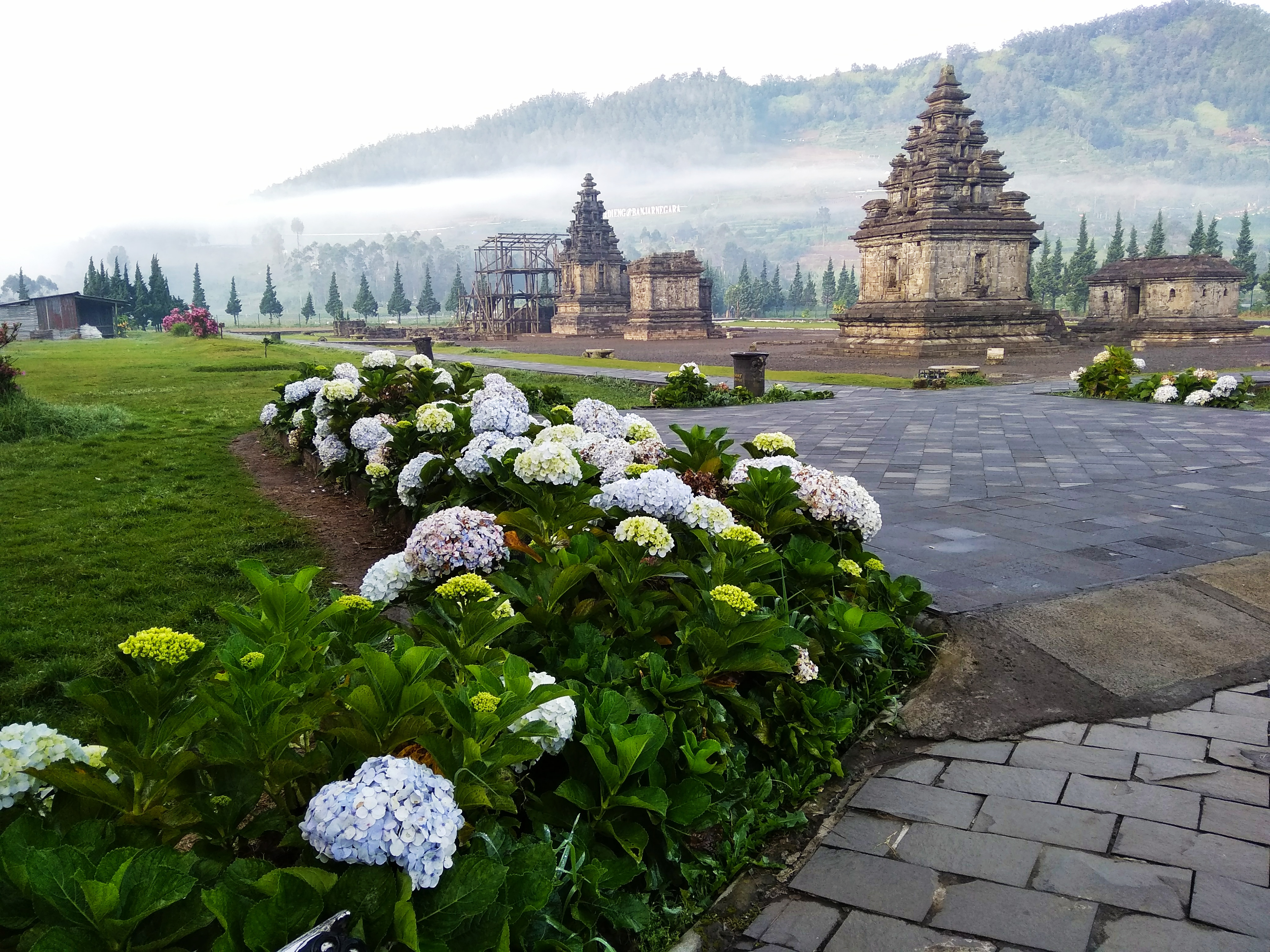
Atmosphere of Arjuna temple in the morning.

Dieng is located at an altitude of ±2,100 meters (6,900 feet) above sea level and is surrounded by mountainous areas.

Dieng has a subtropical highland climate (Köppen: Cwb). During the short dry season (meteorologically in tune with the winter in the Southern Hemisphere), there is little rainfall in the monsoon period (running from October to May, in line with the summer season in Australia). The average annual temperature in Dieng is 14.0 °C. About 2652 mm of precipitation falls each year.

Known for its cold climate, the temperature in Dieng can even drop below 0 °C (32 °F) (along with wind chills down to −2 °C (28 °F)), this condition is usually called Bun Upas, namely frost that covers the Dieng area with temperatures below freezing. Although rare, frost has been recorded annually, particularly in the late evenings and early mornings of July and August, or lasting an average of one week. Although this rare regional weather phenomenon sometimes attracts tourists to gather to watch the frost, when the frost arrives the farms around Dieng will suffer damage and crop failure, with farms and crops such as potatoes being the hardest hit.

Climate data for Dieng (2062 m)
Month	Jan	Feb	Mar	Apr	May	Jun	Jul	Aug	Sep	Oct	Nov	Dec	Year
Mean daily maximum °C (°F)	17.9 (64.2)	18.5 (65.3)	18.6 (65.5)	18.4 (65.1)	18.5 (65.3)	18.5 (65.3)	18.2 (64.8)	18.0 (64.4)	18.5 (65.3)	18.8 (65.8)	19.2 (66.6)	18.8 (65.8)	18.5 (65.3)
Daily mean °C (°F)	13.9 (57.0)	14.3 (57.7)	14.4 (57.9)	14.4 (57.9)	14.3 (57.7)	13.8 (56.8)	13.2 (55.8)	12.8 (55.0)	13.6 (56.5)	14.2 (57.6)	14.7 (58.5)	14.4 (57.9)	14.0 (57.2)
Mean daily minimum °C (°F)	10.0 (50.0)	10.1 (50.2)	10.3 (50.5)	10.4 (50.7)	10.1 (50.2)	9.2 (48.6)	8.3 (46.9)	7.6 (45.7)	8.7 (47.7)	9.6 (49.3)	10.3 (50.5)	10.1 (50.2)	9.6 (49.2)
Average precipitation mm (inches)	370 (14.6)	430 (16.9)	434 (17.1)	249 (9.8)	153 (6.0)	83 (3.3)	53 (2.1)	35 (1.4)	57 (2.2)	170 (6.7)	230 (9.1)	388 (15.3)	2,652 (104.5)

== Geography ==
The Dieng area includes Dieng Kulon (West Dieng) in Banjarnegara and Dieng Wetan (East Dieng) in Wonosobo, this area is known as a mountainous Javanese cultural area. Administratively this highland region is located in the province of Central Java. In the west it is bordered by Serayu Plain, in the east it is bordered by Kedu Plain and in the north it is bordered by the northern coastal area of Pekalongan Regency-Batang Regency and in the south it is bordered by Serayu and Kedu Plain.

Dieng stores natural wealth in the form of geothermal energy which is used for power generation. The location of Dieng geothermal energy is located in two regions, namely Batur District in Banjarnegara Regency and Kejajar District in Wonosobo Regency. The development of the Dieng geothermal investigation was carried out during the reign of the Dutch East Indies in 1918. Then in 1964 Dieng was designated as a geothermal resource with very good prospects in Indonesia. Geothermal wells are drilled to a depth of between 1500 and 2000 meters and the available reserves of geothermal steam are around 400 MW.

Dieng is a highland area with volcanic activity beneath its surface. This area is actually a caldera with the mountains around it as the edges. This also makes Dieng soil so fertile and rich in mineral elements. Although this volcano has been extinct for centuries, some volcanic craters are still active today. Among them are Sileri and Sikidang Crater. Apart from the crater, there are also volcanic lakes in Dieng.

== Agriculture ==
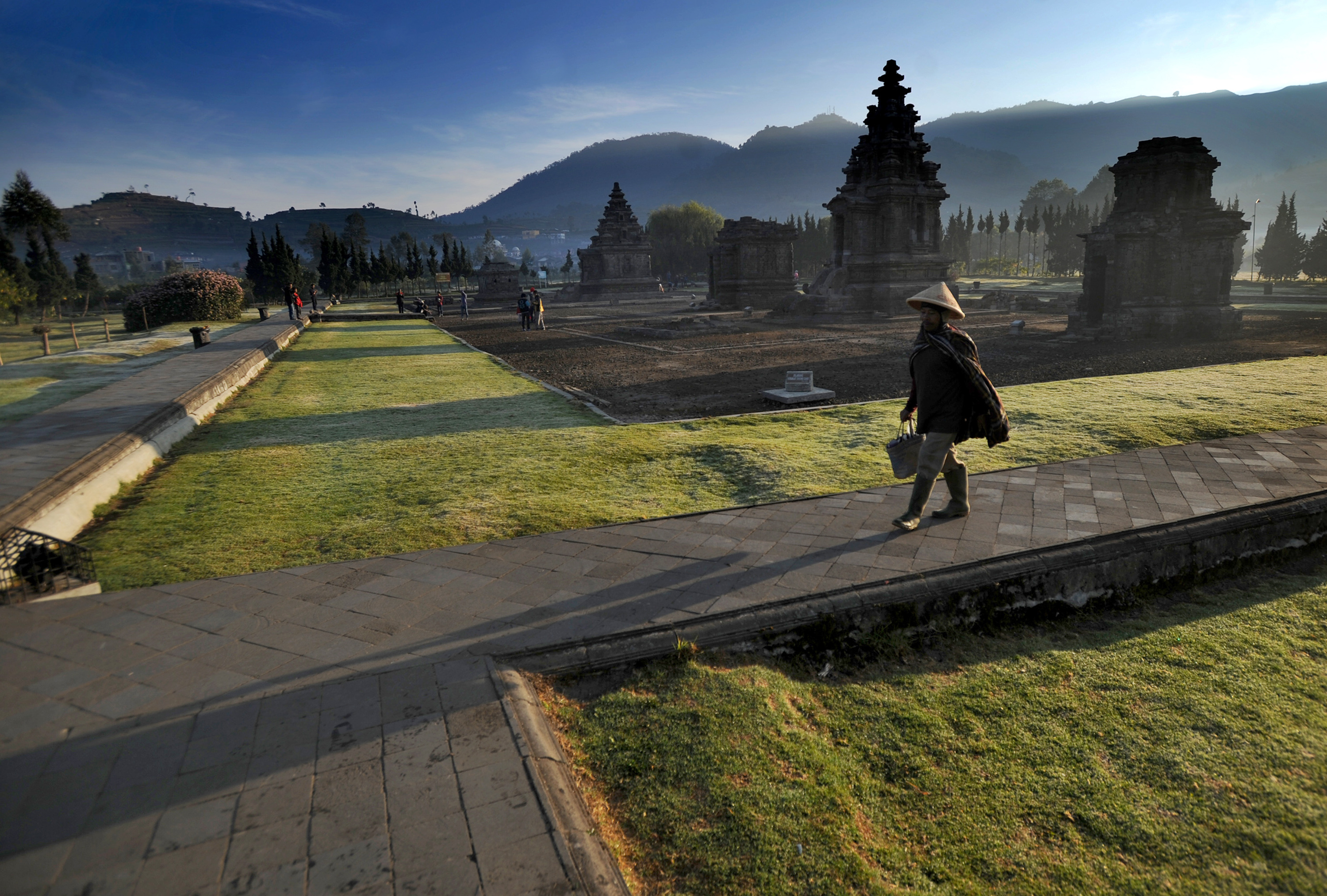
Farmers walk to their fields past the Dieng temple complex.

The plateau is the largest producer of potatoes in Indonesia, with the crop becoming more predominant since 1985. Before this, various other crops such as corn and tobacco were planted instead. Expansion of potato plantations had for a time resulted in significant environmental damage from erosion and deforestation, though recent developments have seen a degree of reforestation.

== Archaeological sites ==
Dieng Plateau hosts a large number of Hindu temples dating from the 8th to 9th centuries. The temples are grouped into three groups; the Arjuna, Dwarawati and Gatotkaca clusters, while the Bima temple was built as a single, separate temple.

== See also ==
- List of volcanoes in Indonesia
- Dieng Volcanic Complex
- Dieng temples
- Kedu Plain
- Kewu Plain
