= Mount Sumbing =

Active stratovolcano on the island of Java, Indonesia

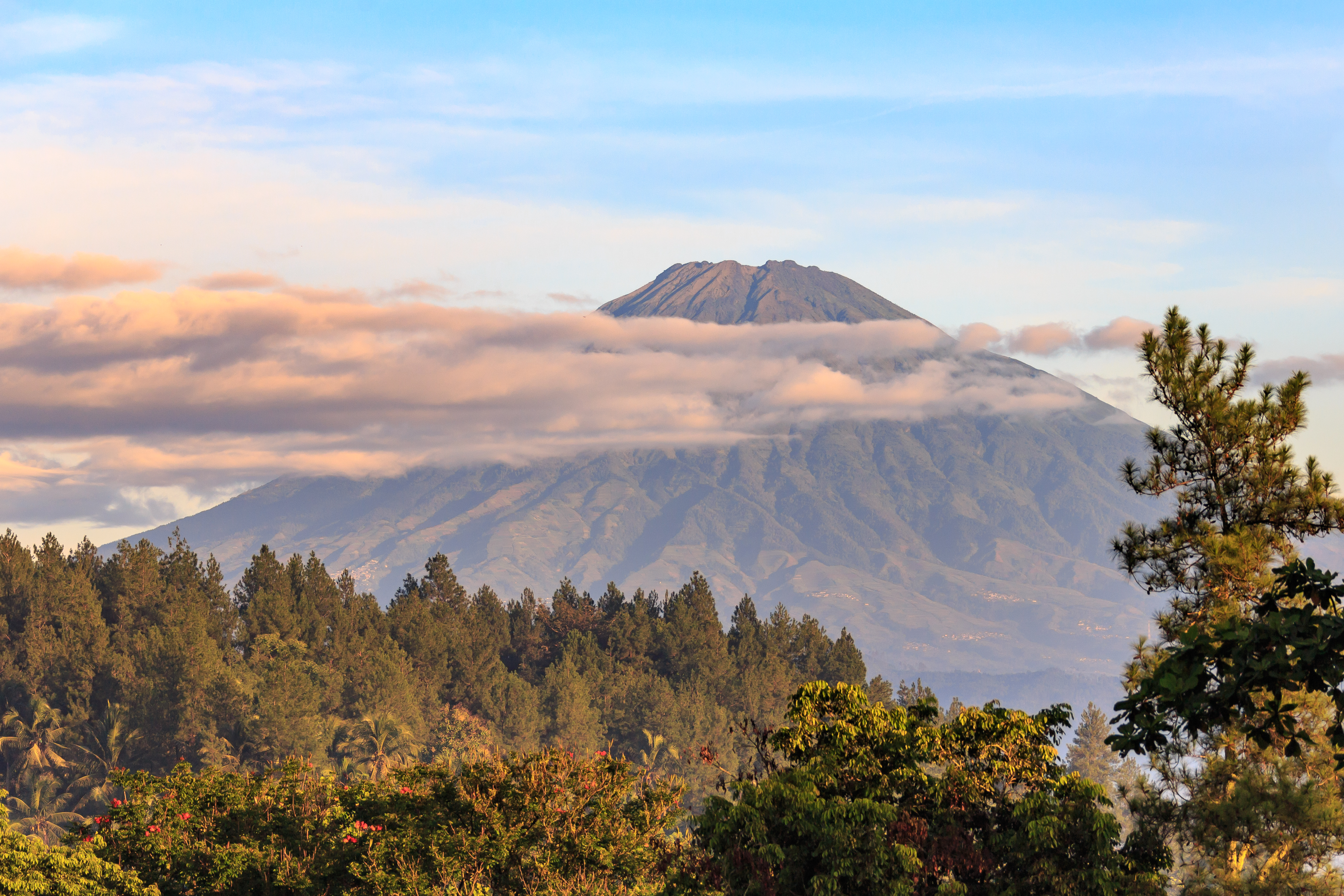
- Mount Sumbing seen from Borobudur temple park

Highest point
- Elevation: 3,371 m (11,060 ft)
- Prominence: 2,577 m (8,455 ft)
- Listing: Ultra; Ribu
- Coordinates: 7°23′06″S 110°04′21″E

Geography
- Location within Java
- Location: Central Java, Indonesia
- Parent range: Sunda Arc

Geology
- Rock age: 701.000 Years
- Mountain type: Stratovolcano
- Volcanic arc: Sunda Arc
- Last eruption: 1730 (?)

Climbing
- Normal route: Garung

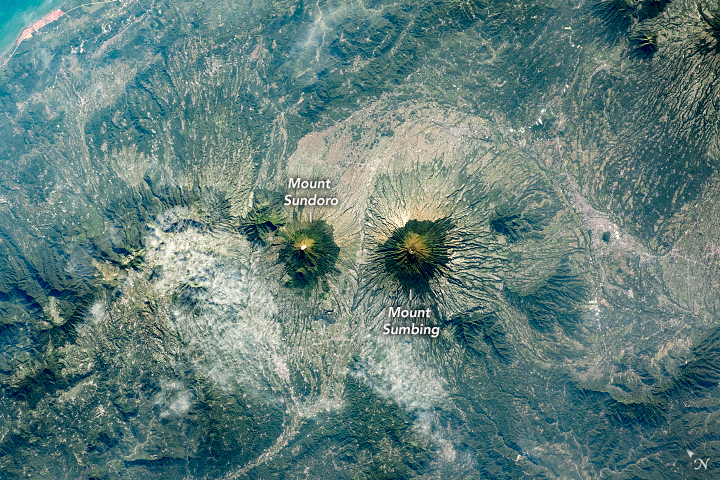
Mts Sundoro and Sumbing from ISS, 2021

Mount Sumbing (Indonesian: Gunung Sumbing) is an active stratovolcano in Central Java, Indonesia. This volcano is symmetrical like its neighbor Mount Sindoro which lies to its northwest. Administratively, The volcano is divided between 3 regencies: Temanggung, Wonosobo, and Magelang. The only report of historical eruptions is from 1730. It has created a small phreatic crater at the summit.

The summit of Mount Sumbing serves as the meeting point of the borders of three river basins, namely, the Progo basin on the eastern side of the mountain, the Serayu basin, and the Bogowonto basin on the western side of the mountain. The Progo River Basin covers more than 50% of the Mount Sumbing complex. Each of these river basins flows towards the southern coast of Java, eventually emptying into the Indian Ocean.

== Gallery ==
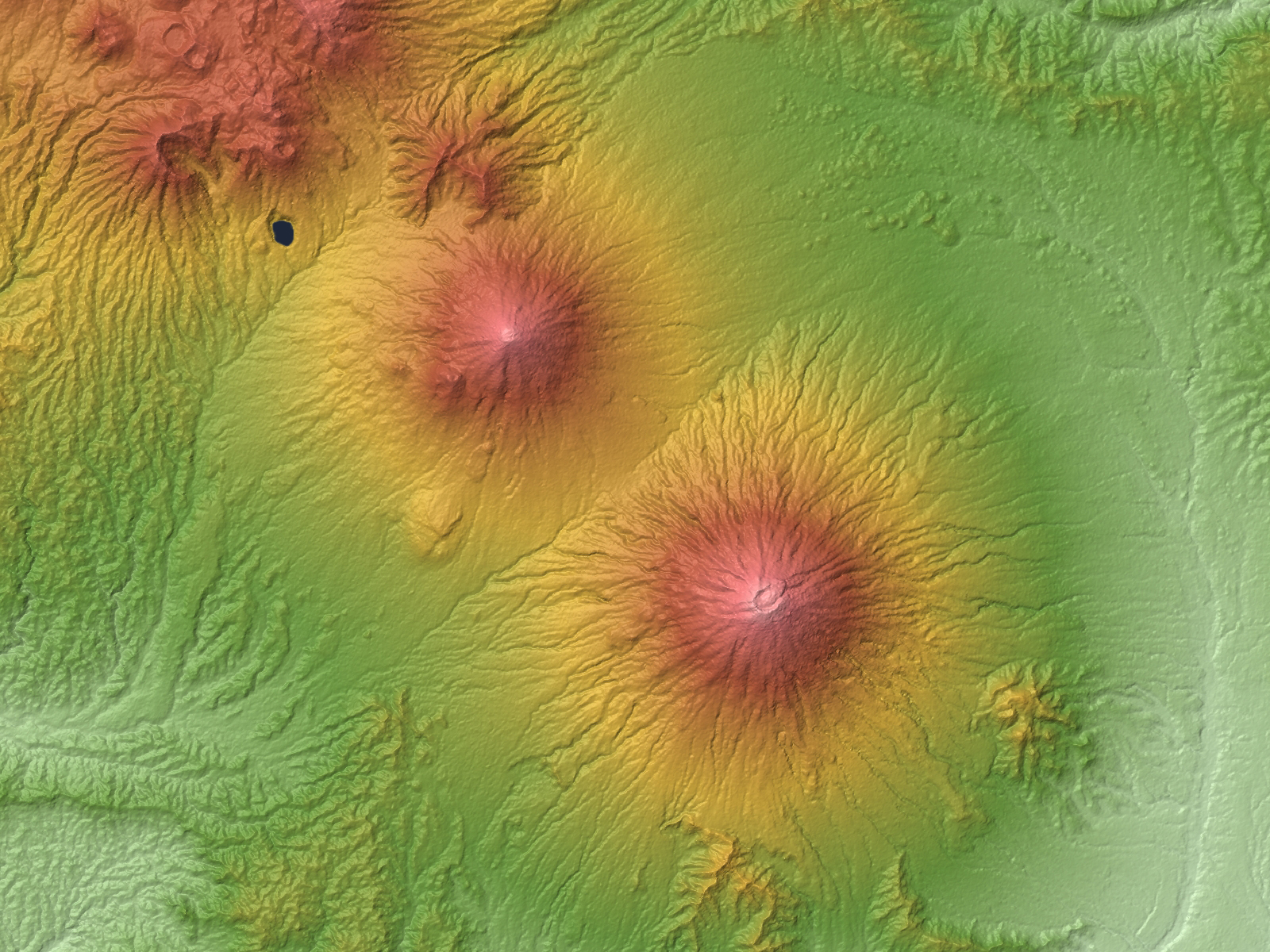
Mount Sundoro (left), Mount Sumbing (right)

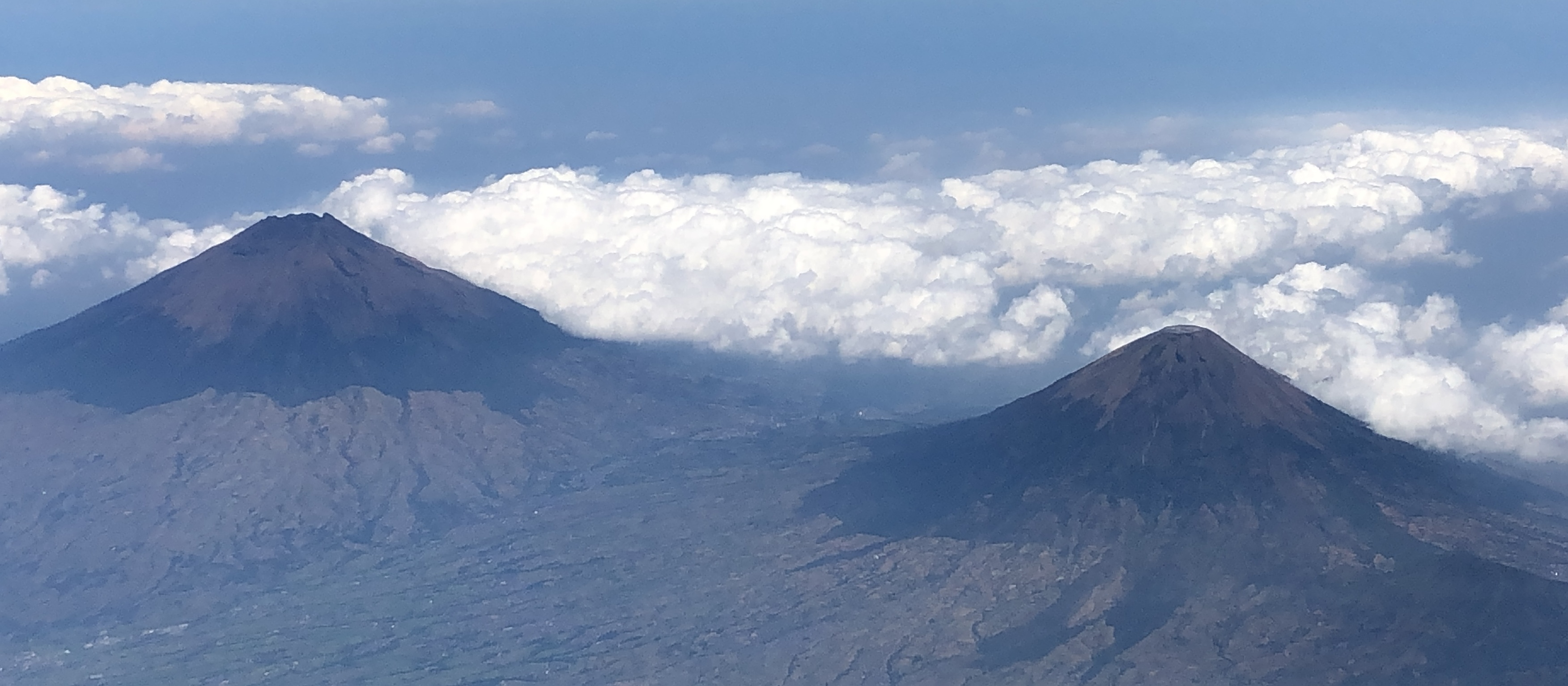
Mount Sumbing (left) and Mount Sindoro (Sundoro) (right) seen from the sky by plane.

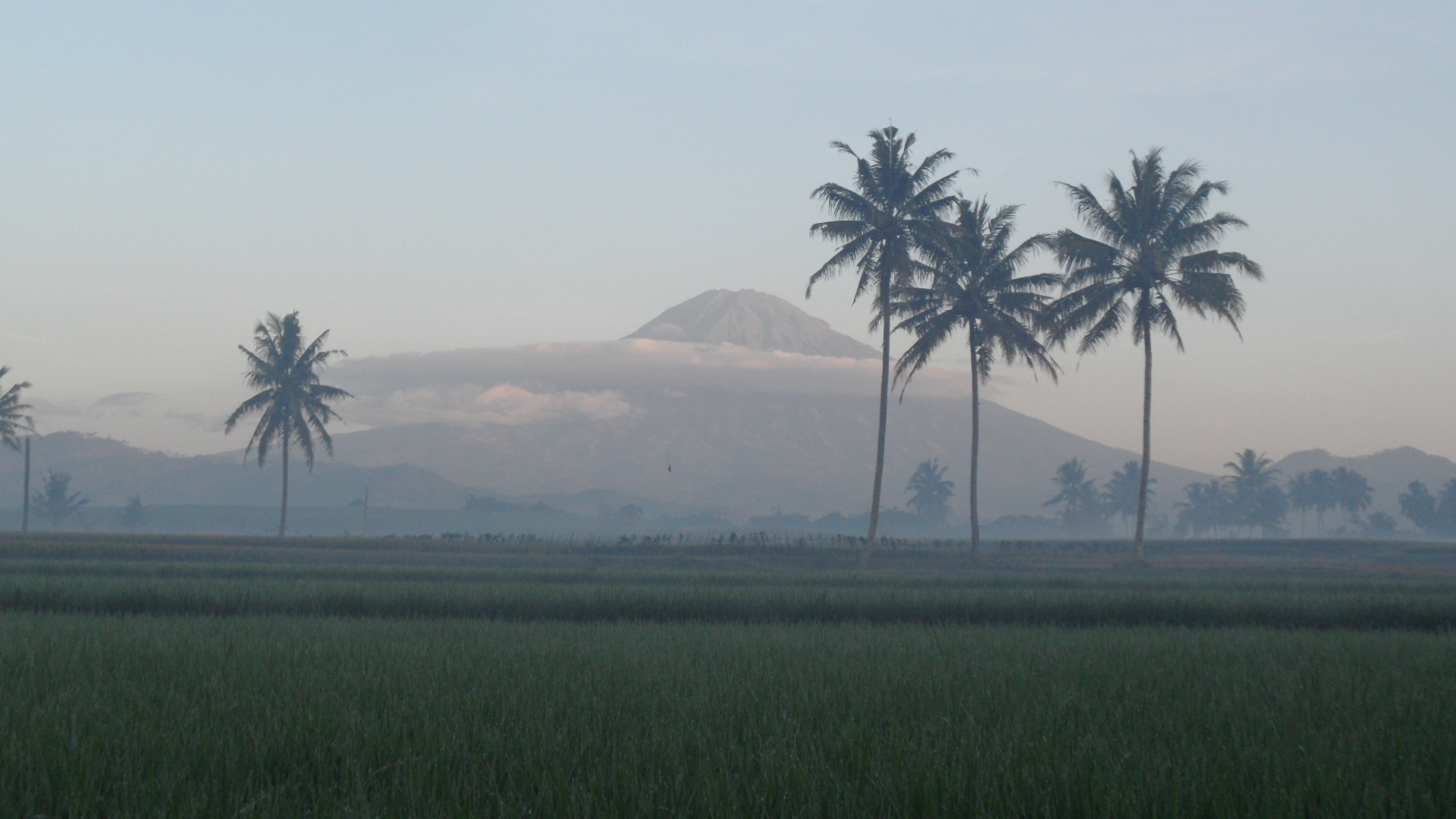
The silhouette of Mount Sumbing from Bondowoso, Temanggung

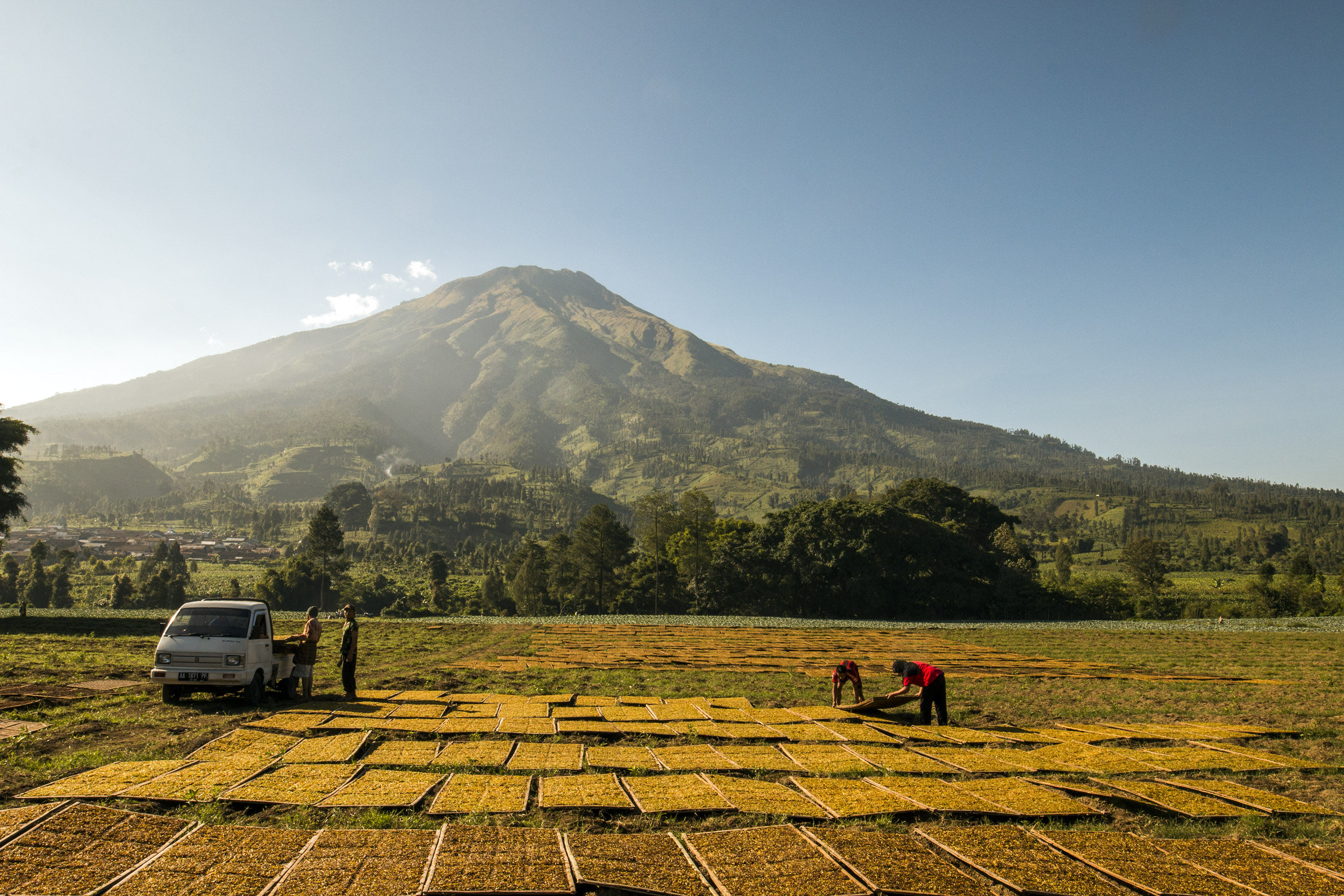
Mount Sumbing in 2016

== See also ==
- List of volcanoes in Indonesia
- List of ultras of the Malay Archipelago
- Progo River
- Serayu River
