= Wonosobo Regency =

Regency in Central Java, Indonesia

Wonosobo Regency Kabupaten Wonosobo
- Regency

Other transcription(s)
  - Javanese: ꦑꦧꦸꦥꦠꦺꦤ꧀ꦮꦤꦱꦧ
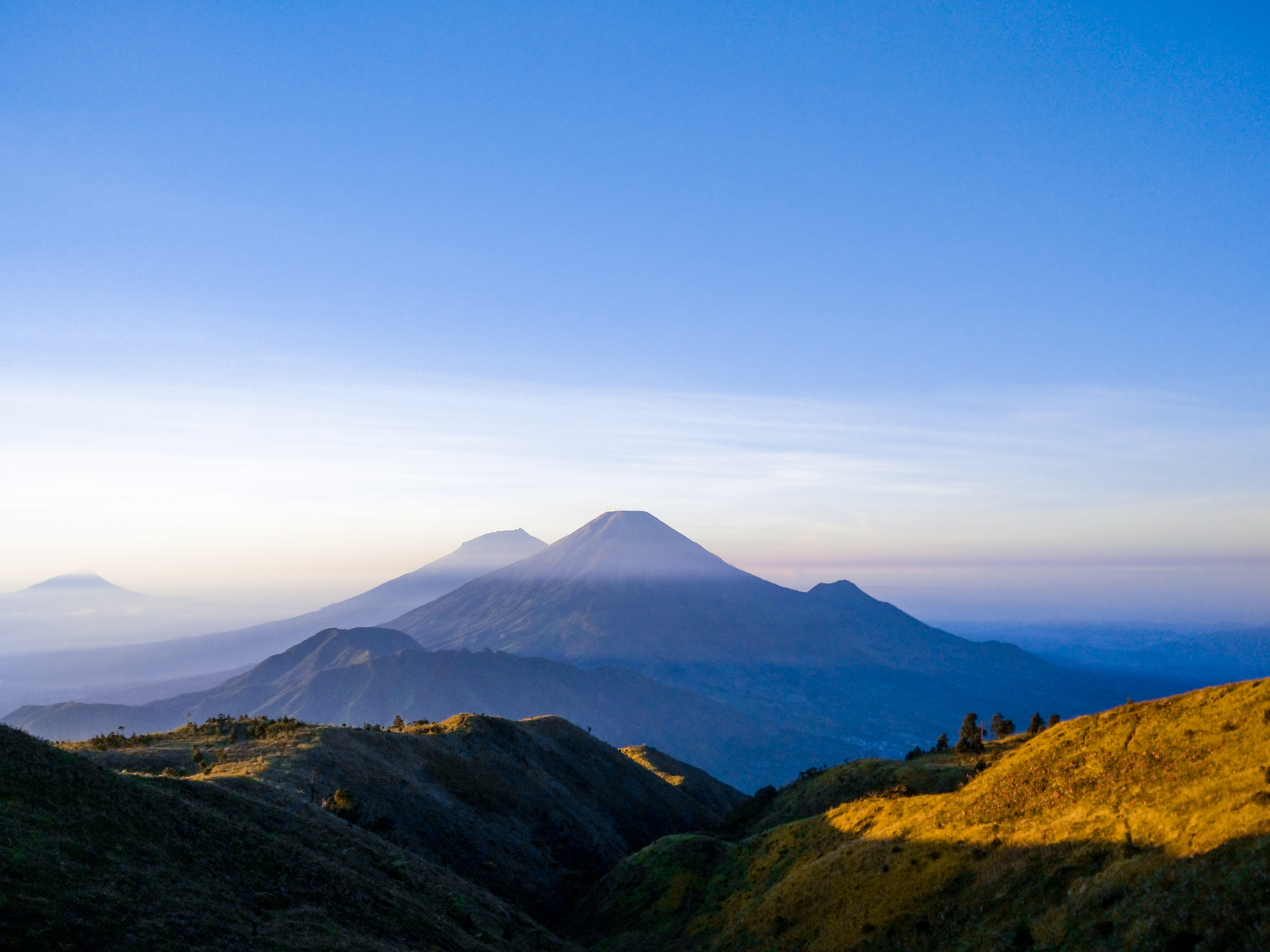
- View of Mount Sindoro and Mount Sumbing from the peak of Mount Prau in Wonosobo

- Coat of arms

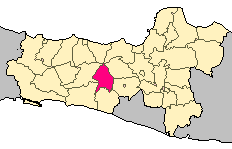
- Location within Central Java

- Location in Java and Indonesia Wonosobo Regency (Indonesia)
- Coordinates: 7.2708631°S 109.9140472°E
- Country: Indonesia
- Region: Java
- Province: Central Java
- Capital: Wonosobo (town)

Government
  - Regent: Afif Nurhidayat
  - Vice Regent: Amir Husein

Area
  - Total: 1,011.62 km^{2} (390.59 sq mi)

Population (mid 2025 estimate)
  - Total: 931,142
  - Density: 920.446/km^{2} (2,383.95/sq mi)
- Time zone: UTC+7 (IWST)
- Area code: (+62) 286
- Website: wonosobokab.go.id

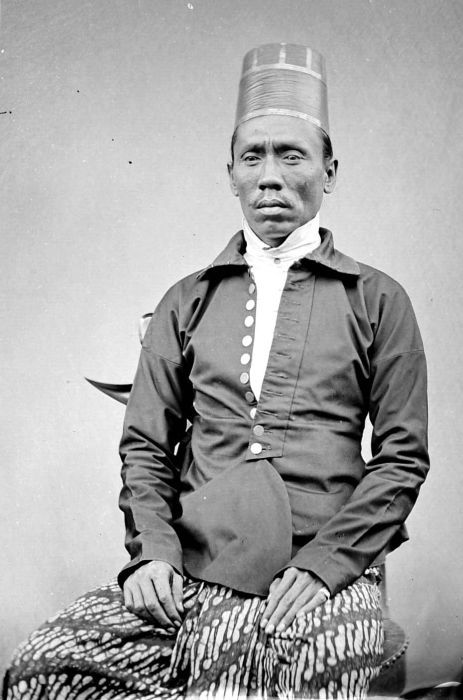
Tumenggung R. Soerjo Hadinagoro, regent of Wonosobo (in office 1898–1919) in 1919

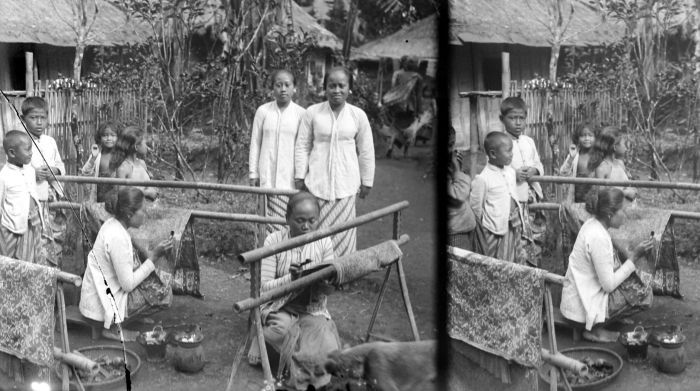
Women making batik in the Wonosobo (early 20th century)

Wonosobo Regency (Indonesian: Kabupaten Wonosobo, pronounced [kabuˌpat̪ɛn wɔnɔˈsɔbɔ]; Javanese: Kabupatèn Wanasaba) is a regency (kabupaten) in Central Java province in Indonesia. The regency seat is located in the town of Wonosobo, located at 7.3684940°S 109.8983841°E, on the Dieng Plateau, about 120 km from Semarang City. Wonosobo Regency shares borders with Temanggung and Magelang Regencies to the east, Purworejo Regency to the south, Kebumen Regency and Banjarnegara Regency to the west, and Batang Regency and Kendal Regency to the north. The regency's area is 1,011.62 km^{2} and its population was 754,883 at the 2010 census and 879,124 at the 2020 census; the official estimate as at mid 2025 was 931,142 (comprising 473,756 males and 457,386 females).

== Etymology ==
The word "Wonosobo" is derived from Javanese Wanasaba, which in turn came from Sanskrit Vanasabhā. It literally means 'the gathering place in the forest'.

== Administrative districts ==
Wonosobo Regency is divided into the following fifteen districts (kecamatan), tabulated below with their areas and their populations at the 2010 census and the 2020 census, together with the official estimates as at mid 2025. The table also includes the location of the district headquarters, the number of administrative villages in each district (totalling 236 rural desa and 29 urban kelurahan), and its post code.

| Kode Wilayah | Name of District (kecamatan) | Area in km^{2} | Pop'n census 2010 | Pop'n census 2020 | Pop'n estimate mid 2025 | Admin centre | No. of villages | Post code |
|---|---|---|---|---|---|---|---|---|
| 33.07.01 | Wadaslintang | 133.28 | 51,402 | 60,502 | 64,396 | Wadaslintang | 17 ^{(a)} | 56365 |
| 33.07.02 | Kepil | 100.23 | 56,184 | 64,478 | 67,793 | Kepil | 21 ^{(a)} | 56374 |
| 33.07.03 | Sapuran | 74.92 | 53,845 | 61,209 | 64,060 | Sapuram | 17 ^{(a)} | 56375 |
| 33.07.15 | Kalibawang | 52.20 | 22,269 | 27,101 | 29,315 | Karangsambung | 8 | 56373 |
| 33.07.04 | Kaliwiro | 101.45 | 43,978 | 51,824 | 55,191 | Kaliwiro | 21 ^{(a)} | 56364 |
| 33.07.05 | Leksono | 45.10 | 39,159 | 46,186 | 49,207 | Leksono | 14 ^{(a)} | 56362 |
| 33.07.14 | Sukoharjo | 56.77 | 31,228 | 35,459 | 37,091 | Sukoharjo | 17 | 56363 |
| 33.07.06 | Selomerto | 41.44 | 44,849 | 53,516 | 57,339 | Selomerto | 24 ^{(b)} | 56361 |
| 33.07.07 | Kalikajar | 80.52 | 57,476 | 70,302 | 76,231 | Kalikajar | 19 ^{(a)} | 56372 |
| 33.07.08 | Kertek | 63.66 | 76,386 | 90,207 | 96,167 | Kertek | 21 ^{(c)} | 56371 |
| 33.07.09 | Wonosobo (town) | 29.28 | 82,488 | 91,909 | 95,262 | Jaraksari | 20 ^{(d)} | 56311: 56319 |
| 33.07.10 | Watumalang | 64.57 | 48,569 | 55,765 | 58,645 | Wonoroto | 16 ^{(a)} | 56352 |
| 33.07.11 | Mojotengah | 48.94 | 58,163 | 67,481 | 71,326 | Kalibeber | 19 ^{(e)} | 56351 |
| 33.07.12 | Garung | 53.89 | 47,954 | 56,988 | 60,938 | Garung | 15 ^{(a)} | 56353 |
| 33.07.13 | Kejajar | 65.38 | 40,933 | 46,197 | 48,181 | Kejajar | 16 ^{(a)} | 56354 |
| | Totals | 1,011.62 | 754,883 | 879,124 | 931,142 | Wonosobo | 265 | |

Notes: (a) including one kelurahan (the district administrative centre). (b) including 2 kelurahan (Selomerto and Wonorejo). (c) includes 2 kelurahan (Kertek and Wringinanom).
(d) comprises 13 kelurahan (Bumireso, Jaraksari, Jlamprang, Kalianget, Kejiwan, Kramatan, Mlipak, Pagerkukuh, Rojoimo, Sambek, Tawangsari, Wonosobo Barat and Wonosobo Timur) and 7 desa.
(e) comprises 3 kelurahan (Andongsili, Kalibeber and Mudal) and 16 desa.

The 29 kelurahan (urban villages) are thus split over 13 districts, with 13 in Wonosobo (town) District, 3 in Mojotengah District, 2 in Selomerto District, 2 in Kertek District, and 1 each in Wadaslintang, Kepil, Sapuran, Kaliwiro, Leksono, Kalikajar, Watumalang, Garung and Kejajar Districts (in the latter cases the sole kelurahan is the district administrative headquarters).

== Climate ==
Wonosobo has an elevation moderated tropical rainforest climate (Af) with moderate rainfall from July to September and heavy to very heavy rainfall in the remaining months. The following climate data is for the town of Wonosobo.

Climate data for Wonosobo
| Month | Jan | Feb | Mar | Apr | May | Jun | Jul | Aug | Sep | Oct | Nov | Dec | Year |
|---|---|---|---|---|---|---|---|---|---|---|---|---|---|
| Mean daily maximum °C (°F) | 26.0 (78.8) | 26.2 (79.2) | 26.6 (79.9) | 26.8 (80.2) | 27.1 (80.8) | 27.1 (80.8) | 26.9 (80.4) | 27.3 (81.1) | 27.5 (81.5) | 27.7 (81.9) | 26.8 (80.2) | 26.0 (78.8) | 26.8 (80.3) |
| Daily mean °C (°F) | 22.0 (71.6) | 22.1 (71.8) | 22.4 (72.3) | 22.5 (72.5) | 22.8 (73.0) | 22.3 (72.1) | 21.8 (71.2) | 22.0 (71.6) | 22.4 (72.3) | 22.9 (73.2) | 22.4 (72.3) | 21.8 (71.2) | 22.3 (72.1) |
| Mean daily minimum °C (°F) | 18.0 (64.4) | 18.0 (64.4) | 18.2 (64.8) | 18.3 (64.9) | 18.5 (65.3) | 17.5 (63.5) | 16.7 (62.1) | 16.7 (62.1) | 17.3 (63.1) | 18.1 (64.6) | 18.1 (64.6) | 17.7 (63.9) | 17.8 (64.0) |
| Average rainfall mm (inches) | 513 (20.2) | 443 (17.4) | 486 (19.1) | 339 (13.3) | 254 (10.0) | 136 (5.4) | 110 (4.3) | 93 (3.7) | 118 (4.6) | 237 (9.3) | 357 (14.1) | 486 (19.1) | 3,572 (140.5) |
Source: Climate-Data.org
