= Kedu Residency =

Kedoe Residency Residentie Kedoe
- Residency of Dutch East Indies
- 1832–1942
- Kedu Residency map in 1920
- Capital: Magelang
- History
  - Established: 1832
  - Disestablished: 1942

Kedu Residency (also known as Kedoe and Kedoo) was a colonial administrative unit in Central Java in Java, Indonesia.

It contained the areas which are now the Kebumen, Wonosobo, Temanggung, Purworejo and Magelang regencies (including Magelang city). All of the areas under the residency were under the Surakarta Sunanate, until the Indonesian government abolished its recognition of the monarchy. It was adjacent to the Banyumas (to the west), and Semarang (to the north) residencies.

Name	Capital	Area (km^{2})	Population 2000 Census	Population 2005 Census	Population 2010 Census	Population 2015 Census
Kebumen Regency	Kebumen	1,211.74	1,166,604	1,196,304	1,159,926	1,184,552
Temanggung Regency	Temanggung	837.71	665,470	687,901	708,546	745,244
Purworejo Regency	Purworejo	1,091.49	704,063	712,851	695,427	710,275
Wonosobo Regency	Wonosobo	981.41	739,648	747,984	754,883	776,847
Magelang Regency	Mungkid	1,102.93	1,102,359	1,137,938	1,181,723	1,244,558
Magelang City	Magelang	16.06	116,800	124,374	118,227	120,769

== See also ==
- List of regencies and cities of Indonesia
