= List of sacred places in Java =

== List of sacred places in Java ==
- Note that Java has at least three main cultural regions determined in part by the linguistic usages.

=== Regions in Java ===
However, as known in Javanese language usage, vocabulary usage in the south western central Java region (Cilacap) can be significantly different from north eastern central Java region (Mount Muria).

- Jakarta
- Sundanese (or West Java)
- Javanese (or Central Java and East Java)
- Tenggerese (or Mount Bromo region)

In each region there are significant numbers of locations that are either currently known as sacred, or have been documented in the past as sacred places.

=== Places ===
In most cases all Candi of Indonesia locations are considered as sacred - despite being in ruins or in advanced stages of decay.

- Borobudur in the Kedu valley west of Mount Merapi in central Java, Buddhist temple
- Mount Tidar in Magelang

- Menang, in Pagu sub-district of Kediri Regency, dedicated to King Jayabaya of Kediri
- Prambanan, Hindu temple
- Ratu Boko
- Turgo a hill on the southern slopes of Merapi

Many graveyards are considered sites of Ziarah or pilgrimage at points of time in the Javanese calendar.

- Makam Wali Songo (The Tombs of the Wali Songo) the nine Islamic Saints who propagated Islam in Java.
  - Sunan Ampel
  - Sunan Kalijaga
  - Sunan Muria
- Imogiri south of Yogyakarta is a royal graveyard.
- Tembayat also known as Bayat is a graveyard visited by Sultan Agung

== See also ==
- Javanese sacred places for categories.
- Candi of Indonesia
- Hinduism in Java
- Indonesian Esoteric Buddhism
- Kejawèn
- Kraton (Indonesia)
