= State Senior High School 1 Mungkid =

- State SHS 1 Mungkid

Location
- Letnan Tukiyat Street Mungkid Town 56511; Magelang Regency, Central Java; Indonesia

Information
- Type: Public school
- Motto: Intelligent, Skilled, Polite, and Pious
- Established: August 11, 1983
- Headmaster: Slamet Suprihanto, S. Pd., M. Pd. (2012 - present)
- Average class size: 10 m × 15 m (33 ft × 49 ft)
- Capacity: 320 students/grade (total ± 960 students)
- Department: Natural Sciences (Ilmu Alam) and Social Sciences (Ilmu Sosial)
- Curriculum: Kurikulum Tingkat Satuan Pendidikan (KTSP), Republic of Indonesia
- Website: www.smansakom.sch.id

State Senior High School 1 Mungkid (Indonesia: SMA Negeri 1 Kota Mungkid) is a high school in Magelang regency which occupies a land area of 3 hectares in a small town called Mungkid Town, the capital town of Magelang regency, Indonesia. The school was founded in 1983 and initiated the establishment of a Capital town of Magelang District in 1984, Mungkid Town. The school is located at Letnan Tukiyat Street 56511 Mungkid Town, Magelang regency. As the school is located in Magelang regency capital, then the schools that originally only had four of the buildings are being built. On the 4th anniversary in 2003, State Senior High School 1 Mungkid has evolved into a school that meets the standards of schools of type A, with has 18 classrooms, a library, and laboratories. The present State Senior High School 1 Mungkid has 24 new classrooms and have a predicate as RSBI (International School Stubs) which will be managed under the supervision of the Directorate.

== Students profile ==
The campus of State Senior High School 1 Mungkid is located in the Mungkid Town which became the capital of Magelang regency. Nevertheless, this school is located not exactly at the center of town, but would be a beautiful and quiet area. Thus, State Senior High School 1 Mungkid is very acceptable for teaching and learning. Students who attended these schools dominated by students who live in the areas of the Magelang district of Central, East and South as Mertoyudan, Salaman, Tempuran, Mungkid, Sawangan, Borobudur, Muntilan, Srumbung, Salaman, Ngluwar, Pakis, Tegalrejo and Salam. In fact, there are also students that come from other areas outside like City of Magelang, Selo (Boyolali), Cepogo (Boyolali District), and Kalibawang (Kulonprogo regency, DIY).

== Facilities ==
As schools and the largest public school in Magelang District, State Senior High School 1 Mungkid has had a wide range of facilities and infrastructure of International standard. As evidence, these schools have implemented the E-Learning learning system with an LCD projector in the room and Wi-Fi connection which can be accessed at any time throughout the school area. This school has also a special room for any extracurricular activities and sports facilities are very complete. In fact, State Senior High School 1 Mungkid also has a large auditorium or hall building measuring 50 mx 20 mx 10 m which serves as an indoor sports venue and place arrangements for the various events and school events.

== Academic affairs ==
The addition of the lessons in the afternoon for subjects relating to the UN and SNMPTN, in collaboration with alumni who had been a student at the State University for students to broaden the class XI and XII to introduce and can choose the appropriate State Universities and according to his ability. As for the class X, held TPA (Test of Academic Potential) and IQ tests to identify and measure each student's cognitive ability.

== Studies program ==
- Special Subjects
1. Natural Science Subjects include Math, Physics, Chemistry, and Biology as subjects trademark. For additional lessons, Electronics Skills lessons also given.
2. Social Sciences Subjects include Math, Economics, Sociology, and Geography as a subject trademark. For additional lessons, French lessons also given.
- General Subjects include Islam, Indonesian, English, Civics, History, Sports, Information and Communication Technology and the Arts of Music and Fine Arts
- Minimal criteria for completeness (KKM) for each subject in State Senior High School 1 Mungkid has determined to be 75.

== Organizations ==
Here are the kinds of organizational activities in State Senior High School 1 Mungkid:

- OSIS and MPK are the parent organization for the students and become an intermediary for other organizations. OSIS administered and managed by the students elected to take charge of student council.
- Council Bantara shelves are scouting organization that consists of class XI students and served as administrators and supervisors in the X-class scout activities at school, while
- Council Laksana shelves are scouting organization consisting of a class XII student and served as supervisor and mentor for the Council Bantara shelves.
- School Safety Patrol (MCC) is an organization that is assigned to conduciveness and school security guard in accordance with prevailing norms. MCC educates its members to be disciplined, brave and responsible. School Safety Patrol-member students of State Senior High School 1 Mungkid is working with the Magelang Resort Police based in the Mungkid Town for School Safety Patrol training.
- Rokhis is a religious organization in charge of taking care of activities to do with Islam.
- Rokha is a religious organization in charge of taking care of the activities that have anything to do with the Christian or Catholic Religion.
- Red Cross Youth (PMR) is an organization of the Red Cross who had been giving P3K during outdoor activities such as ceremonies, etc.
- Honesty Canteen Board (PKI) is a student organization that was formed specifically to deal with financial data and honesty in the school canteen goods.
- Scientific Work Teams Youth (KIR) is a student organization that has activities such as trial practice and writing of scientific papers.
- Creativity Magazine Wisskom team is an organization of students who have the creativity of the work and writing in school magazines and periodicals Wisskom wall.
- Olympic team is a collection of student achievement in a subject area that will follow the Olympics race or inter-school subjects. Following the Olympic Team:
1. Mathematics
2. Physics
3. Chemical
4. Biology
5. Astronomy
6. Computer
7. Earth
8. Economy
- TUB and PBB are team that has talent and interest in the order of the flag raising ceremony and marching, usually the team became official National Day Flag Ceremony and represent the school following the race TUB & PBB.
- Signs of Honor Troops (Banner) is in charge of the troops carrying the flag, the flag a symbol of student council, and the flag symbol in the Palm Branch Inauguration Ceremony of the New Organisational Management boards.
- Force flag raisers (Paskibra) is the force flag raisers at the Big Day Commemoration Ceremony at the District Mertoyudan, Magelang regency, and Central Java province.
- SMANSAKOM Basketball Club is a basketball club of State Senior High School 1 Mungkid that the players are members of extracurricular basketball. SMANSAKOM Basketball Club is usually represented the school in the race and inter-school basketball game.
- EC is English club of State Senior High School 1 Mungkid whose members are the students who follow the extra-curricular English clubs.
