= Muhammadiyah University of Magelang =

Private university in Indonesia

- Universitas Muhammadiyah Magelang
- The Gate for Your Golden Age
- Other names: Unimma
- Motto: Par-Excellence in Science and research, Islamic behavior in services and action
- Type: Private university
- Established: August 31, 1964
- Rector: Dr. Lilik Andriani, M.Si
- Academic staff: 350
- Undergraduates: 5000
- Location: Magelang, Java, Indonesia; 7°29′16.73″S 110°13′7.45″E
- Website: unimma.ac.id

Muhammadiyah University of Magelang (Indonesian: Universitas Muhammadiyah Magelang, abbreviated as Unimma) is a private university that belongs to Muhammadiyah organization. The university was founded in Magelang, Central Java, Indonesia on August 31, 1964.

== History ==
Initially, Muhammadiyah University of Magelang was a branch of Muhammadiyah University of Jakarta. It later split off. It is now led by Dr. Lilik Andriani, M.Si.

== Campuses ==
Muhammadiyah University of Magelang has two main campuses:

=== Campus I ===
Campus I is located in Magelang. It is known as Tidar Campus. The campus has two main wing buildings for administrative offices, students offices, research center, library, and faculties such as economic, law, and education.

=== Campus II ===
Campus II is located on Jalan Mayjend. Bambang Soegeng, Mertoyudan, Magelang Regency. It is known as Mertoyudan Campus. It is located on the main road connecting Magelang and Yogyakarta. Campus II is used by the faculties of Health, Industrial Engineering and Informatics, and Islamic Studies. The campus, which consist of three main buildings, also functions as administrative offices, library, radio station (Unimma FM), Shariah micro bank (BMT Shariah), and mini market.

In 2011, the university finished a building for rectors office, academic and administrative office, quality insurance office, Center of Research office, and meeting rooms.

== List of Rectors ==
- 1964–1966 Sjaf Efendi, SH
- 1966–1981 R. Slamet Wedyosusanto CPA
- 1981–1992 Drs. Sidik Soepomo
- 1992–1999 Drs. H. Masman Andara
- 1999–2004 Drs. Mashuri Maschab
- 2004–2006 Dr. H. Chairil Anwar
- 2006–2012 Prof. Dr.H. Ahmadi
- 2012–2020 Ir. Eko Muh. Widodo MT
- 2020–2021 Dr. Suliswiyadi, M.Ag.
- 2021–present Dr. Lilik Andriani, M.Si

== Faculties and studies program ==
Unimma is categorized as a middle university in Indonesia. Every year, it receives 1000-1500 student applications from around Indonesia. The majority of students come from Central Java, especially from Kedu plateau areas such as Magelang, Temanggung, Wonosobo, Banjarnegara, Kebumen, and Purworejo. Muhammadiyah University of Magelang offers studies program for undergraduate students. There are six faculties: Economics, Law, Education, Engineering, Health, and Islamic studies.

=== Faculty of Economics ===
- Management (S1)
- Accounting (S1)

=== Faculty of Law ===
- Private Law (S1)
- Criminal Law (S1)
- State Administration Law (S1)

=== Faculty of Education ===
- Guidance and Counseling (S1)
- Education for Pre-school Pedagogy (S1)

=== Faculty of Engineering ===
- Industrial Engineering (S1)
- Computer Science and Informatics (S1 and D3)
- Automotive (D3)

=== Faculty of Health Science ===
- Nurse (S1 and D3)
- Pharmacy (S1 and D3)

=== Faculty of Islamic Studies ===
- Islamic Education (S1)
- Islamic Economic Sciences and Banking (S1)
- The Education of Islamic Primary School Teachers (S1)

== Centers and offices ==
- The Quality Insurance Board functions to insure the university quality in learning and academic activities.
- The Center of Research and Services for Society (LP3M) helps researchers conduct their work, such as research training, funding, and assistance in getting an access to sponsorship from funding partners either from the government or aid foundation.
- The Center of Islamic Studies (P3SI) is focused on Islamic guidance and counseling for students and university staff. Beside that, the center is responsibility in designing and implementing Islamic curriculum standard of UMM.
- The Language Center (Pusat Bahasa) gives language training and courses for students and lecturers. The center provides for English courses for the students.
- Library.

== Facilities and student welfare ==
- Wall Climbing
- Theater (Teater Fajar)
- Scout
- Martial Art (Tapak Suci Putra Muhammadiyah=TPSM)
- Economic Cooperation Unit (Unit Koperasi Mahasiswa)
- Music
- Choir Unit
- Adventure and Nature Lover (Mentari)
- Journalism (Suara Mahasiswa)
- Muhammadiyah Students Association (in Bahasa: Ikatan Mahasiswa Muhammadiyah, IMM)
- Students Body Organization consists of executive and representative body in university level and faculty (Badan executive Mahasiswa (BEM) and Badan Perwakilan Mahasiswa (BPM))

== See also ==
- List of Islamic educational institutions
