= State University of Semarang =

Indonesian university

- Universitas Negeri Semarang
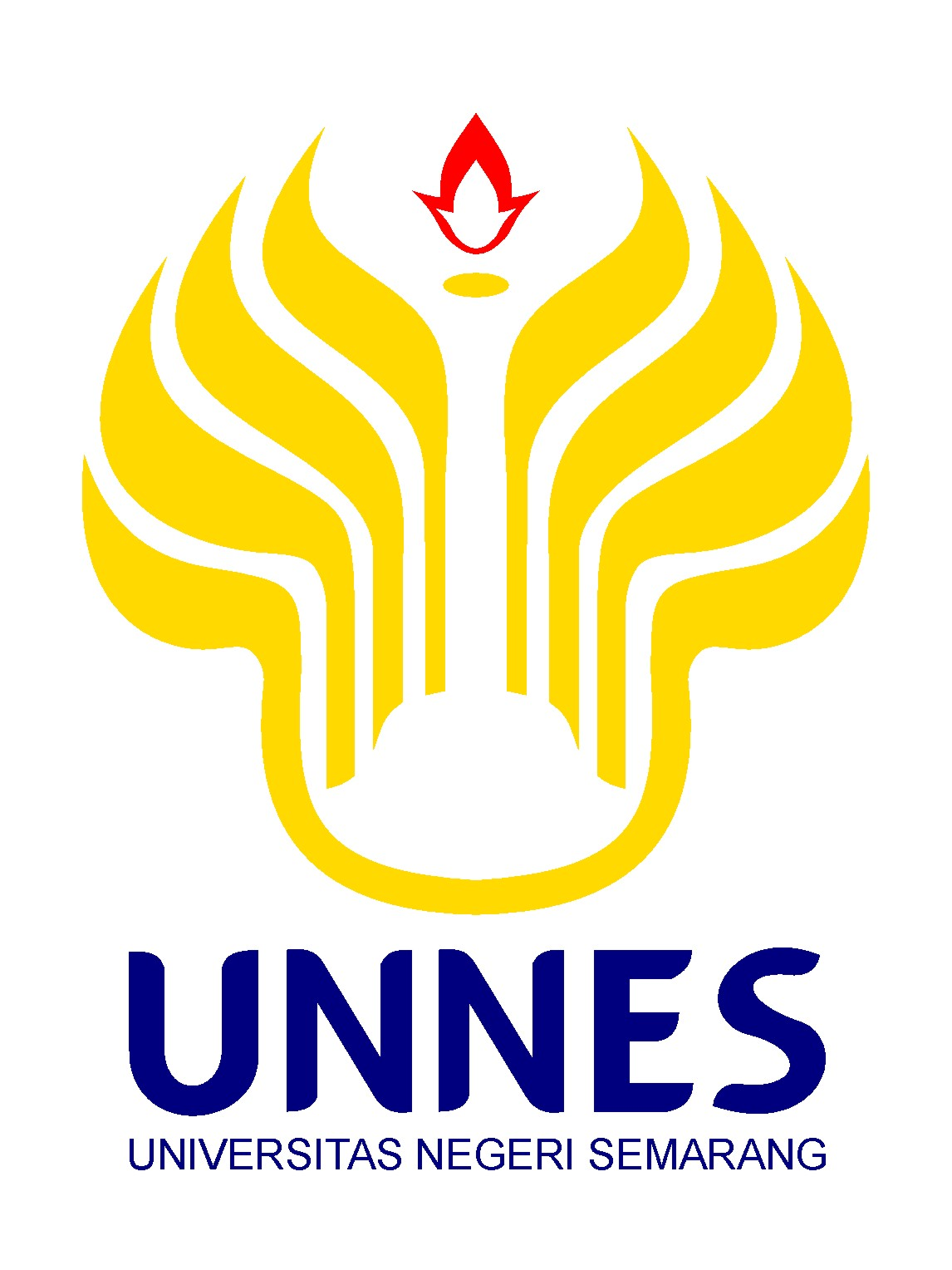
- Former name: IKIP Semarang
- Motto: Universitas Berwawasan Konservasi dan Bereputasi Internasional
- Motto in English: Becoming a Conservation University with International Reputation
- Type: Public
- Established: 1965
- Affiliations: ASAIHL|AQAS|ASEAN University Network|ASIIN|BAN-PT|LPTK
- Rector: Prof. Dr. S Martono, M.Si.
- Faculty: 9
- Administrative staff: 2000
- Students: 52.970 (2026)
- Undergraduates: 12.032 (2026)
- Postgraduates: 1.063 (2026)
- Doctoral students: 329 (2026)
- Location: Sekaran Campus, Gunungpati, Semarang, Central Java, Indonesia; 7.048722°S 110.389639°E
- Campus: Urban
- Colours: Yellow, White and Blue
- Website: www.unnes.ac.id
- Location in Semarang

State University of Semarang (Indonesian: Universitas Negeri Semarang, commonly abbreviated as UNNES) is a public university in the city of Semarang, Central Java, Indonesia. On October 20, 2022, UNNES became a State University with Legal Entity Status (PTN-BH) pursuant to Government Regulation of the Republic of Indonesia No. 36 of 2022.

== History ==
The history of the development of Semarang State University—formerly known as IKIP Semarang—began with the establishment of various teacher-training institutions at the high school level. These teacher-training institutions were: the Middelbaar Onderwijzer A Course (MO-A) and the Middelbaar Onderwijzer B Course (MO-B). Both were educational institutions established by the Dutch colonial government with the aim of training teachers for junior high schools (SMTP) and senior high schools (SMTA). The MO-A and MO-B courses were held in Semarang until 1950. In 1950, the MO-A course was renamed the B-I Course, and the MO-B course was renamed the B-II Course, both of which continued until 1960.

The subsequent development of UNNES can be traced through the following stages.

==== 1960–1963: Faculty of Teacher Training and Education (FKIP) and College of Physical Education (STO) ====
In 1960, Course B-I and Course B-II were integrated into Diponegoro University to form the Faculty of Teacher Training and Education (FKIP). In 1963, the Department of Physical Education—which had originally been part of Course B-II—was separated to become the College of Sports (STO), an independent institution under the Ministry of Sports.

==== 1963–1965: Yogyakarta Institute of Teacher Training and Education (IKIP), Semarang Branch ====
In 1963, a Presidential Decree was issued establishing IKIP as an institution for training educators. At that time, there were only four IKIPs: in Jakarta, Bandung, Malang, and Yogyakarta. The FKIP at Diponegoro University was deemed not yet capable of operating independently, was designated as the Semarang branch of IKIP Yogyakarta.

==== 1965–1999: IKIP Semarang ====
The Semarang branch of IKIP Yogyakarta grew rapidly. To ensure its future development was better guided, while awaiting a Presidential Decree, the Minister of Higher Education, Science, and Technology issued Ministerial Decree No. 40 of 1965, dated March 8, 1965, which established the Semarang branch of IKIP Yogyakarta as IKIP Semarang, comprising the Faculty of Educational Sciences, the Faculty of Literature and Arts Education, the Faculty of Social Sciences, the Faculty of Exact Sciences Education, and the Faculty of Engineering Education. In 1977, the physical education teacher training program was reintegrated into the main institution under a new structure called the Faculty of Physical Education (FKIK).

==== Period 1999 to present: Semarang State University (UNNES) ====
With the issuance of Presidential Decree No. 124 of 1999 regarding the transformation of IKIP Semarang, Bandung, and Medan into universities, IKIP Semarang was subsequently renamed Semarang State University, abbreviated as UNNES. In 2000, the names of the faculties within UNNES were changed to:

1. Faculty of Education
2. Faculty of Languages and Arts
3. Faculty of Social Sciences
4. Faculty of Mathematics and Natural Sciences
5. Faculty of Engineering
6. Faculty of Sports Sciences

In 2006, the Faculty of Economics was established, and a year later, the UNNES Faculty of Law was formed; On 2023, the Faculty of Medicine was established. the establishment of these three new faculties was a natural consequence of the institution’s transition to university status in which makes the total faculties into 9 faculties.

== Academics ==
=== Faculties and Study Programs ===
The university consists of 9 faculties with various study programs at the undergraduate and post-graduate levels; with each faculties has a specialties in education;

==== 1. Faculty of Education ====
A. Education Study Program:

- Bachelor of Early Childhood Teacher Education (PG-PAUD)
- Bachelor of Nonformal Education

B. Non-Education Study Program:

- Bachelor of Psychology
- Bachelor of Educational Technology
- Bachelor of Elementary School Teacher Education (PGSD)

==== 2. Faculty of Languages and Arts ====
A. Education Study Program:

- Bachelor of Indonesian Language and Literature Education
- Bachelor of English Language Education
- Bachelor of Javanese Language and Literature Education
- Bachelor of French Language Education
- Bachelor of Arabic Language Education
- Bachelor of Japanese Language Education
- Bachelor of Mandarin Language Education
- Bachelor of Fine Arts Education
- Bachelor of Music Arts Education
- Bachelor of Dance Arts Education
- Master of Indonesian Language Education
- Master of English Language Education
- Master of Arts Education
- Doctorate of Language Education
- Doctorate of Arts Education

B. Non-Education Study Program:

- Diploma of Visual Communication Design
- Bachelor of English Literature
- Bachelor of Indonesian Literature
- Bachelor of Javanese Literature
- Bachelor of French Literature
- Bachelor of Fine Arts

==== 3. Faculty of Social Sciences ====
A. Education Study Program:

- Bachelor of History Education
- Bachelor of Geography Education
- Bachelor of Pancasila and Civics Education
- Bachelor of Sociology and Anthropology Education
- Bachelor of Social Studies Education
- Master of Geography Education
- Master of Social Studies Education
- Doctoral of Social Studies Education

B. Non-Education Study Program:

- Bachelor of Historical Science
- Bachelor of Geography
- Bachelor of Political Science
- Bachelor of Communication Science
- Master of History Studies

==== 4. Faculties of Mathematics and Natural Sciences ====
A. Education Study Program:

- Bachelor of Mathematics Education
- Bachelor of Physics Education
- Bachelor of Physics Education
- Bachelor of Biology Education
- Bachelor of Natural Science Education
- Master of Mathematics Education
- Master of Physics Education
- Master of Chemistry Education
- Master of Natural Science Education
- Doctor of Mathematics Education
- Doctor of Natural Science Education

B. Non-Education Study Program:

- Diploma of Applied Statistics and Computation
- Bachelor of Mathematics
- Bachelor of Physics
- Bachelor of Chemistry
- Bachelor of Biology
- Bachelor of Informatics Engineering
- Bachelor of Information Systems
- Bachelor of Environmental Science
- Master of Physics
- Master of Biology

==== 5. Faculty of Economics and Business ====
A. Education Study Program:

- Bachelor of Economics Education
- Bachelor of Accounting Education
- Bachelor of Office Administration Education
- Master of Economics Education
- Doctor of Economics Education

B. Non-Education Study Program:

- Bachelor of Accounting
- Bachelor of Management
- Bachelor of Development Economics
- Bachelor of Islamic Economics and Finance
- Master of Economics

==== 6. Faculty of Sports Sciences ====
A. Education Study Program:

- Bachelor of Physical Education, Health, and Recreation
- Bachelor of Sports Coaching Education
- Bachelor of Elementary Physical Education
- Master of Sports Education
- Doctor of Sports Education

==== 7. Faculty of Engineering ====
A. Education Study Program:

- Bachelor of Building Engineering Education
- Bachelor of Mechanical Engineering Education
- Bachelor of Automotive Engineering Education
- Bachelor of Electrical Engineering Education
- Bachelor of Informatics and Computer Engineering Education
- Bachelor of Family Welfare Education
- Bachelor of Culinary Arts Education
- Bachelor of Fashion Design Education
- Bachelor of Beauty Education

B. Non-Education Study Program:

- Bachelor of Civil Engineering
- Bachelor of Architecture
- Bachelor of Mechanical Engineering
- Bachelor of Electrical Engineering
- Bachelor of Chemical Engineering
- Bachelor of Computer Engineering
- Master of Civil Engineering
- Master of Chemical Engineering
- Engineer Profession Program

==== 8. Faculty of Law ====
A. Non-Education Study Program:

- Bachelor of Law
- Doctor in Law
- Master in Law

==== 9. Faculty of Medicine ====
A. Non-Education Study Program

- Bachelor of Medicine
- Bachelor of Veterinary Medicine
- Bachelor of Public Health
- Bachelor of Nutrition
- Bachelor of Pharmacy
- Master of Public Health
- Doctoral of Public Health
- Medical Doctor Profession Program

== Campuses ==
UNNES is a multi-campus university, with one main campus and three regional campuses that spreads across several districts in the city of Semarang. The main campus is at Sekaran, Gunungpati; while others are at Gajahmungkur and Ngaliyan. The following is a list of the main campuses and areas of UNNES:

Campus	Name	Location	Facilities and Purposes
Sekaran	Sekaran Campus	Sekaran, Gunungpati, Semarang	The Sekaran Campus is the main campus, located in Sekaran Village, Gunungpati, Semarang City. Classes for the D3 and S1 programs are held at this campus, except for the Primary Elementary Teacher Education (PGSD) program, which is held at the Ngaliyan campus. The University’s Central Library is also located here. Several facilities are also in this campus, such as; University Administration Center, Student Activity Center, Library (Rumah Ilmu), gymnasium, stadium, dormitories, and others.
Kelud	Kelud Campus	Kelud Raya St. No. 19 F, Sampangan, Gajahmungkur, Semarang	Kelud Campus is located on Kelud Raya Street in Semarang, this campus houses the Faculty of Medicine and Post-Graduate school.
Ngaliyan	Ngaliyan Campus	Beringin Raya St. No. 15, Ngaliyan, Semarang	Ngaliyan Campus is located on Karanganyar, Ngaliyan in Semarang. This campus houses the Primary Elementary Teacher Education (PGSD) program.
Bendan Dhuwur	Bendan Dhuwur Campus	Lamongan Tengah St. No. 2, Bendan Ngisor, Gajahmungkur, Semarang	Bendan Dhuwur Campus is located on Gajahmungkur, Semarang. This campus, alongside with Kelud campus, houses the Post-Graduate School.

== Facilities ==
UNNES has diverse range of facilities that are provided, especially in Gunungpati campus for most, which includes:

Facility Type	Facility Name
Academic	Library, Lecture Halls, Laboratories, Language Center, Integrated Academic System (SIKADU), E-journals
Student Services	Dormitories, Scholarships, Student Clubs
Sporting Facilities	Soccer field, Track and field, Long jump (Stadium), Tennis courts (2 courts), FIK Laboratory (Indoor) Hockey field, Tennis courts (2 courts), Basketball court, Volleyball court, Softball field,Swimming pool, Rock climbing wall, Golf range (Outdoor)
Public Facilities	Ulul Albab Mosque, Multi-purpose building or GSG (Indonesian) (Central Parking Building, Bank, and Minimarket), Post Office, Clinic, Campus Bus

== Student Organizations ==
There are in total of 59 Student Organizations in UNNES, including:

Field	Name of Student Activity Unit
Literature and Arts	Fine Arts and Design Club, Marching Band, Modern Rebana, Choir, Kethoprak, Classical Dance, Creative Dance, Karawitan, Panembrama, Wayang Orang, Photography, SS Theater, Cakra
Sports	Badminton, Softball, Hockey, Volleyball, Track and Field, Table Tennis, Tennis, Basketball, Swimming, Chess, Taekwondo, Karate
Special Interests	Scouts, Student Regiment (Resimen Mahasiswa), Indonesian Red Cross (PMI), Student Nature Club (Mahapala), Robotics (Riptek), Student Radio Club (REM FM), Culinary Arts (BOGA)
Research and Reasoning	Research Club, English Debate Club (EDS)

== Notable Alumni ==
Notable Alumni of UNNES

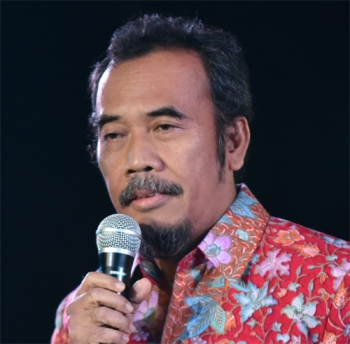
Indonesian Public Speaker, Humanist – Prie GS

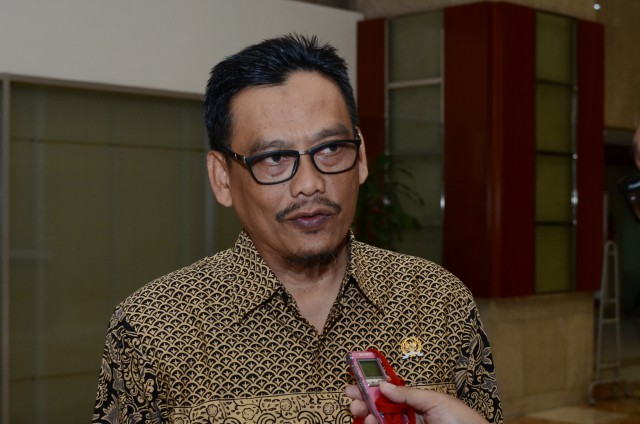
Indonesian Politician – Abdul Fikri Faqih

=== Journalist, Writer, Cartoonist ===
- Sawali (Indonesian Writer)
- Ita Kurniawati (Indonesian Novel Writer)

=== Academics and Teachers ===
- Hendi Pratama (Indonesian Lecturer and Content Creator)
- Prof. DR. Cahyo Yusuf, M.Pd. (Rector of Tidar University)
- Raeni (Indonesian Lecturer, known as "Anak Becak")

=== Writer, Cultural Figure, Artist, Model ===
- Helarius Daru Indrajaya (Indonesian Singer and Music Artist)
- Hendra Kumbara (Indonesian Singer, Music Artist)
- Bagas Prasetyo (Indonesian Singer, Music Artist)
- Prie GS (Indonesian Public Speaker, Humanist)
- Muhammad Abdul Wahid (Indonesian Automotive Youtuber)
- Budi Sutomo (Indonesian Celebrity Chef)

=== Politicians and Bureaucrats ===
- Abdul Fikri Faqih (Indonesian Politician)
- Farida Farichah (Indonesian Politician)
