= Prie GS =

Indonesian journalist and media host (1965–2021)

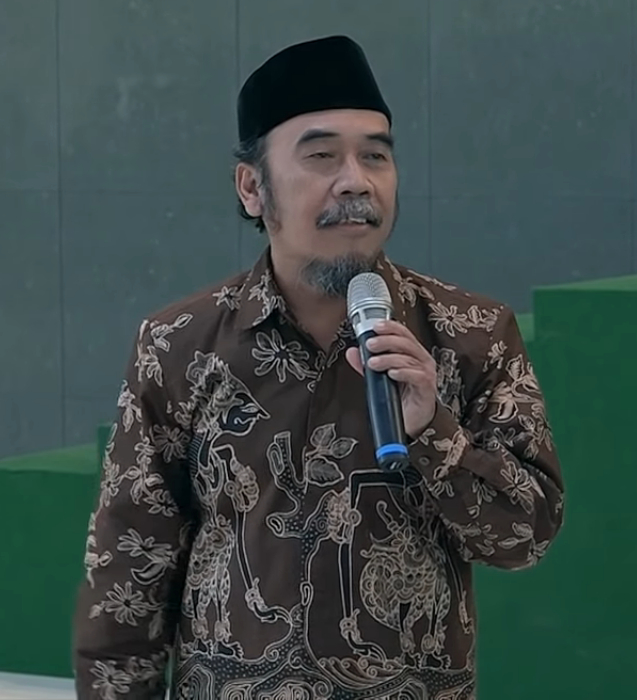
- Portrait of Prie GS
- Born: 3 February 1965; Kendal Regency, Indonesia
- Died: 12 February 2021 (aged 56); Semarang, Indonesia
- Occupations: Journalist; Media Host

Prie GS (3 February 1965 – 12 February 2021) was an Indonesian journalist, cartoonist, writer, and radio and television show host.

== Biography ==
Prie was born and raised in the Kendal Regency in Central Java. His family was full of industrial workers, but he immersed himself in creative drawing. He studied top cartoonist with Kompas Gerardus Mayela Sudarta. After he finished secondary school, he attended the State University of Semarang, where he improved his creative and journalistic skills and landed himself a job at Suara Merdeka. Several years later, he became the Director of women's magazine Cempaka.

After many years of working as a journalist and director, Prie decided to dedicate some focus to cartooning. He was invited to Tokyo by the Japan Foundation to a cartoon exhibition, and he eventually became an illustrator for Jembatan Mberok. Soon, his many travels and experiences prompted him to become a public speaker. He was invited by corporations such as Telkom Indonesia, Bank Indonesia, Perusahaan Listrik Negara, Telkomsel, and many others, to give motivational speeches for their employees. He was then able to host radio and television programs due to his speaking skills.

Prie GS died of a heart attack in Semarang on 12 February 2021 at the age of 56, nine days after his birthday.
