= Tidar University =

Coordinates: 7.460227°S 110.216356°E

- Universitas Tidar
- Former names: Universitas Tidar Magelang (private university period)
- Motto: Unggul dalam Kewirausahaan (Indonesian)
- Motto in English: Leading in entrepreneurship
- Type: Public university
- Established: 1980 (as UTM); 2014 (as Untidar)
- Rector: Prof. Dr. Sugiyarto, M.Si.
- Location: Jalan Kapten Suparman 39, Potrobangsan, Magelang, Central Java, Indonesia
- Campus: Suburban: Tuguran campus
- Colours: Yellow
- Mascot: Eagle
- Website: www.untidar.ac.id

Tidar University (Indonesian: Universitas Tidar, abbreviated as Untidar) is a public university in North Magelang, Central Java. The university’s name is derived from Mount Tidar in Magelang.

== History ==
Untidar was originally called Magelang Tidar University (Indonesian: Universitas Tidar Magelang) and was a private university founded in 1979. Even back then, the university had already had five faculties, although before 1980, the Faculty of Teaching and Education Science was called the Faculty of Letters. Untidar only started offering associate and bachelor’s degrees in 1984.

Untidar finally became a public university in 2014.

== Logo and philosophy ==
Untidar’s logo consists of three distinct components, each with their own meaning:

1. A mountain, in reference to Mount Tidar, reflecting Untidar’s firmness and Indonesia’s three pillars of higher education.
2. A flying eagle, describing Untidar’s agility, sharpness, strength, and inquisitive nature.
3. The eagle head facing right, referring to Untidar’s orientation to innovation and truth.
4. A pair of open wings, referring to tools to reach higher achievement.
5. Five feathers on each side of the wings, in reference to Pancasila.

== Academics ==
Untidar offers degrees from those in the vocational level to postgraduate degrees. It has five faculties and a total of 20 study programs, which is detailed in the following:

=== Faculty of Economics ===
- Economic Development (Bachelor Degree)
- Management (Bachelor Degree)
- Accounting (Bachelor Degree)
- Accounting (Vocational)

=== Faculty of Social and Political Sciences ===
- Public Administration (Bachelor Degree)
- Law (Bachelor Degree)
- Communication (Bachelor Degree)

=== Faculty of Teaching and Education Sciences ===
- Indonesian Language and Literature Education (Bachelor Degree)
- Indonesian Language and Literature Education (Master Degree)
- English Language Education (Bachelor Degree)
- Science Education (Bachelor Degree)
- Biology Education (Bachelor Degree)
- Mathematics Education (Bachelor Degree)

=== Faculty of Agriculture ===
- Agrotechnology (Bachelor Degree)
- Animal Science (Bachelor Degree)
- Aquaculture (Bachelor Degree)

==== Faculty of Engineering ====
- Electrical Engineering (Bachelor Degree)
- Mechanical Engineering (Bachelor Degree)
- Mechanical Engineering (Vocational)
- Civil Engineering (Bachelor Degree)

== Ranking ==
According to Webometrics’ 2021 report, Untidar ranked 164th from all higher education institutions in Indonesia.
