= Javanese sacred places =

Locations in Java, Indonesia

Javanese sacred places are locations on the Island of Java, Indonesia that have significance from either village level through to national level as sacred, and in most cases deserve visitation—usually within the context of ziarah regardless of the ethnicity or religion of the visitor. The dominant form for many places is a sacred grave, or a place associated with persons considered to have special attributes in the past—like Wali Sanga or Royalty.

== Form ==
The tendency has been for graves to equate to sacred places, but the full range can include (and this list is not exhaustive)

- Caves (Goa or Gua)
- Trees, or a group of trees (Pohon or Hutan)
- Mountains and volcanoes
- Landscape
- Springs
- Rock Outcrops
- Man made fixed structures - temples, buildings, and ruins
- Kraton structures are considered sacred
- Places of rest of Javanese saints or legendary characters

In some areas in Java, the tell-tale sign that a place has been ascribed sacred or special, is either traces of burnt incense (kemenyan) or flower petals.

== Terminology ==
Common expressions in Javanese and Indonesian for these places are:

- Pundhen - short for pepundhen
- Tempat Keramat
- Tempat Ziarah

Other terms that might be used

- petilasan - traces - of ancestors.

Although there is no necessary set pattern, and each individuals pilgrimage is a very personal one, even if travelling with a group.

=== National ===
The graves of national and regional heroes and significant people—either of distant historic nature (the graves of the Wali Sanga or Islamic Saints of Java), or of more recent dates—national heroes of the last 100 years or so, and leaders and 'special people'.

Some examples:

- Borobudur, 9th century Mahayana Buddhist Temple, a powerful symbol for Indonesia to testify for its past greatness
- Prambanan, 8th-century Hindu temple
- Menang, in Pagu sub-district of Kediri Regency, dedicated to King Jayabaya of Kediri
- Mount Tidar in Magelang
- Ratu Boko
- The graves of the Wali, Sunan Kalijaga
- The grave of Sultan Agung at Imogiri
- The grave of Sukarno in Blitar
- National Heroes cemetery in Kalibata, Jakarta

=== Regional ===
The graves and sites related to regionally significant figures who might be ethnically or regionally specific, rather than of national significance.

- Graves of local officials
- Graves of local families related to the Palaces, such as Yogyakarta, Surakarta

=== Local ===
The graves relating specifically to an individual—one's parents' graves, or grandparents' graves. Also sites within the localities of one's birth, or the graves of one's parents.

Natural sites - such as trees, rock outcrops, and springs carry significant folklore, some of which is collected and published.

== The Networks ==
Considering the population of Java, and the potential to have a wide variation of the significances and networks of places that might be important to an individual, it is possible to think of Java as having a vast network of places that are situated within a complex array of visitations at the time of Idul Fitri that sees roads blocked by eager pilgrims clogging the transport networks of Java.

== See also ==
- Candi of Indonesia
- Hinduism in Java
- Kejawèn
