= Mungkid =

Mungkid Town
- Nickname: Kota Mungkid
- Motto: Mungkid Kota Budaya
- Location within Indonesia
- Coordinates: 7°28′0″S 110°13′0″E
- Country: Indonesia
- Province: Central Java
- Regency: Magelang Regency
- Established: March 22, 1984

Area
  - Total: 40.23 km^{2} (15.53 sq mi)
- Elevation: 350 m (1,150 ft)

Population (mid 2024 estimate)
  - Total: 76,778
  - Density: 1,908/km^{2} (4,943/sq mi)
- Time zone: UTC+7 (WIB)
- Area code: +62293

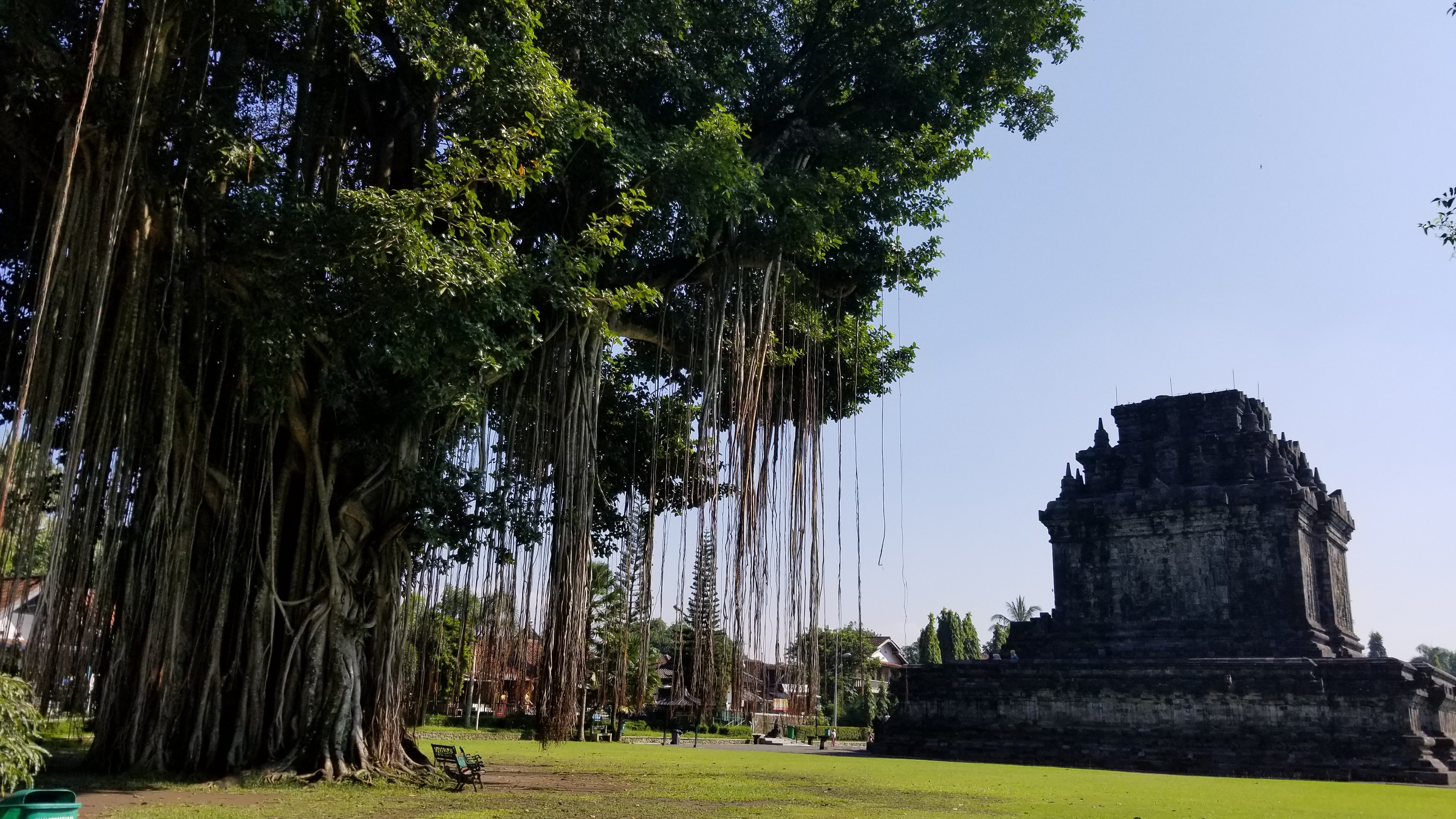
Mendut Buddhist Temple, Mendut Village, Mungkid District, Magelang Regency, Central Java.

Mungkid is the capital of Magelang Regency, Central Java, Indonesia. The town center is located in the village of Sawitan. All government offices or agencies of Magelang Regency are located there, including the offices owned by private parties. Mungkid town was founded on 22 March 1984 to replace the city of Magelang as the administrative seat of Magelang Regency. Each 22 March is celebrated by the citizens of Magelang Regency as Mungkid's anniversary. Many people consider this town as an administrative town and alternative city (although it does not have city status). The major Buddhist temple of Borobudur is about 4 km from the center of Mungkid.

== History ==
After Independence in Indonesia in 1945, the city of Magelang was declared as the capital of the Magelang regency. However, in 1950, Magelang city was declared a separate municipality and was given the right to manage its own affairs. It was therefore decided to relocate the capital of Magelang regency. Besides providing independence to Magelang city to manage its own affairs, other considerations also pointed to the advantages of locating the capital of the regency. It was felt that the establishment of a separate administrative capital might help to stimulate the growth and development of the region. Four alternatives were considered as the site of the new regency capital: Mungkid, Muntilan, Secang and Mertoyudan.

Mertoyudan District and Mungkid District in the town centre of Sawitan were selected as the new capital of the Magelang Regency with the name of Mungkid. The inauguration of Mungkid as the capital took place on 22 March 1984, attended by Central Java Governor HM Ismail.

== Villages ==
1. Ambartawang
2. Blondho
3. Bojong
4. Bumireja
5. Gondhang
6. Mendut
7. Mungkid
8. Ngrajek
9. Pabèlan
10. Pagersari
11. Paremana
12. Pragawati
13. Rambeanak
14. Sawitan
15. Senden
16. Treka

Note that Mendut and Sawitan have the status of kelurahan (urban villages), while the other 14 have the status of desa (rural villages).

== Climate ==
Mungkid has a tropical monsoon climate (Am) with moderate to little rainfall from June to September and heavy to very heavy rainfall from October to May.

Climate data for Mungkid
Month	Jan	Feb	Mar	Apr	May	Jun	Jul	Aug	Sep	Oct	Nov	Dec	Year
Mean daily maximum °C (°F)	28.8 (83.8)	29.0 (84.2)	29.4 (84.9)	30.0 (86.0)	30.0 (86.0)	30.1 (86.2)	29.5 (85.1)	30.0 (86.0)	30.1 (86.2)	30.5 (86.9)	29.5 (85.1)	28.8 (83.8)	29.6 (85.4)
Daily mean °C (°F)	25.0 (77.0)	25.1 (77.2)	25.4 (77.7)	25.7 (78.3)	25.6 (78.1)	25.2 (77.4)	24.3 (75.7)	24.6 (76.3)	25.0 (77.0)	25.7 (78.3)	25.3 (77.5)	24.8 (76.6)	25.1 (77.3)
Mean daily minimum °C (°F)	21.2 (70.2)	21.2 (70.2)	21.4 (70.5)	21.4 (70.5)	21.3 (70.3)	20.3 (68.5)	19.2 (66.6)	19.3 (66.7)	20.0 (68.0)	20.9 (69.6)	21.1 (70.0)	20.9 (69.6)	20.7 (69.2)
Average rainfall mm (inches)	355 (14.0)	330 (13.0)	362 (14.3)	266 (10.5)	191 (7.5)	103 (4.1)	44 (1.7)	40 (1.6)	66 (2.6)	168 (6.6)	287 (11.3)	342 (13.5)	2,554 (100.7)
Source: Climate-Data.org
