= Suroloyo Peak =

Mountain in Java, Indonesia

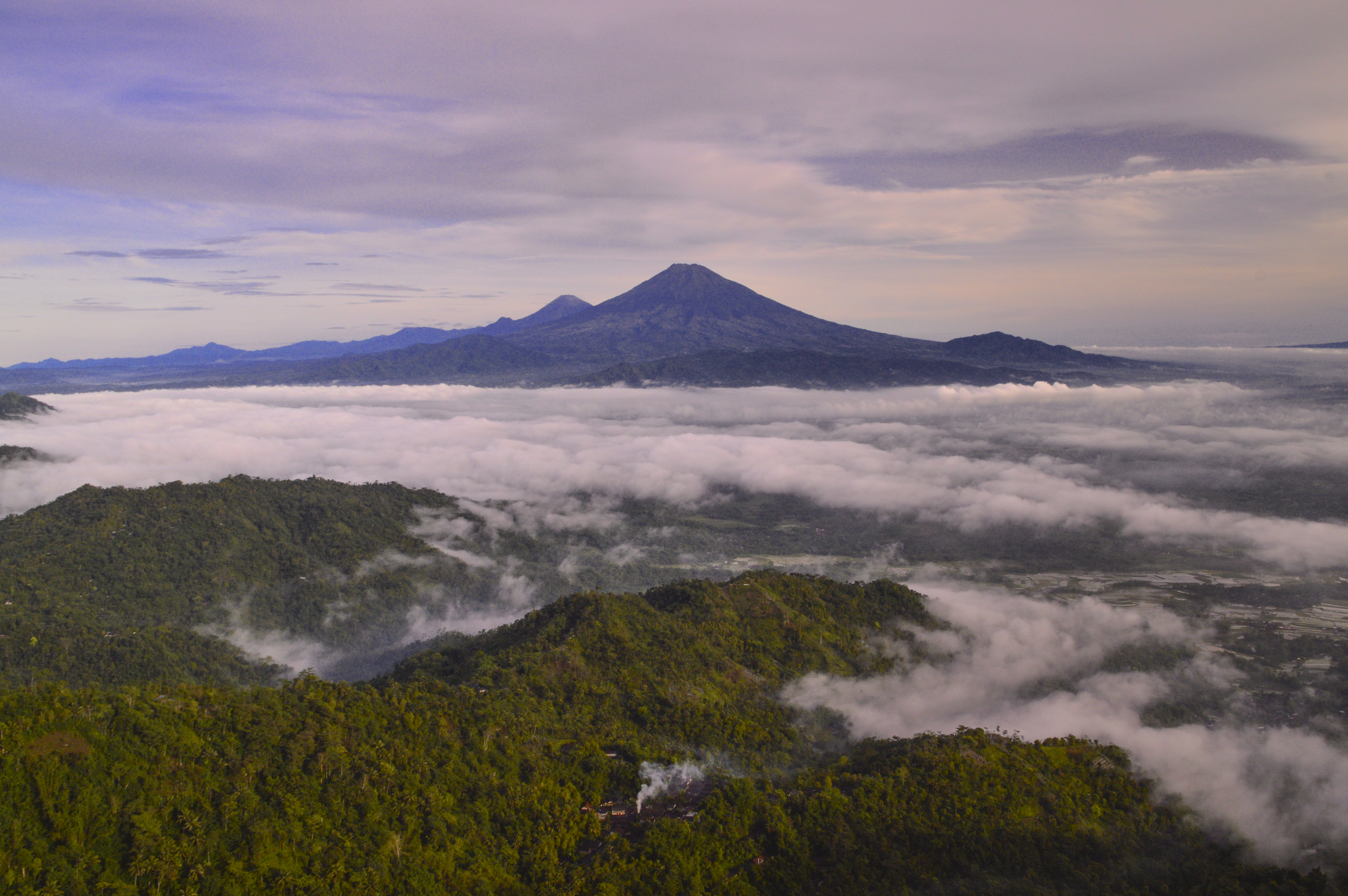
- View from Suroloyo, In the background: Mount Sumbing, Mount Sindoro, and surrounding areas.

Highest point
- Elevation: 981 m (3,219 ft)
- Coordinates: 7°38′46.69″S 110°10′51.963″E

Geography
- Location within Java
- Location: Java, Indonesia
- Parent range: Menoreh Mountains
- Topo map: BAKOSURTANAL Sendangagung

Geology
- Rock age: Miocene-Oligocene

Suroloyo Peak is one of the peaks of Menoreh Mountains on the island of Java, Indonesia.
