= Mount Tidar =

Hill in Central Java, Indonesia

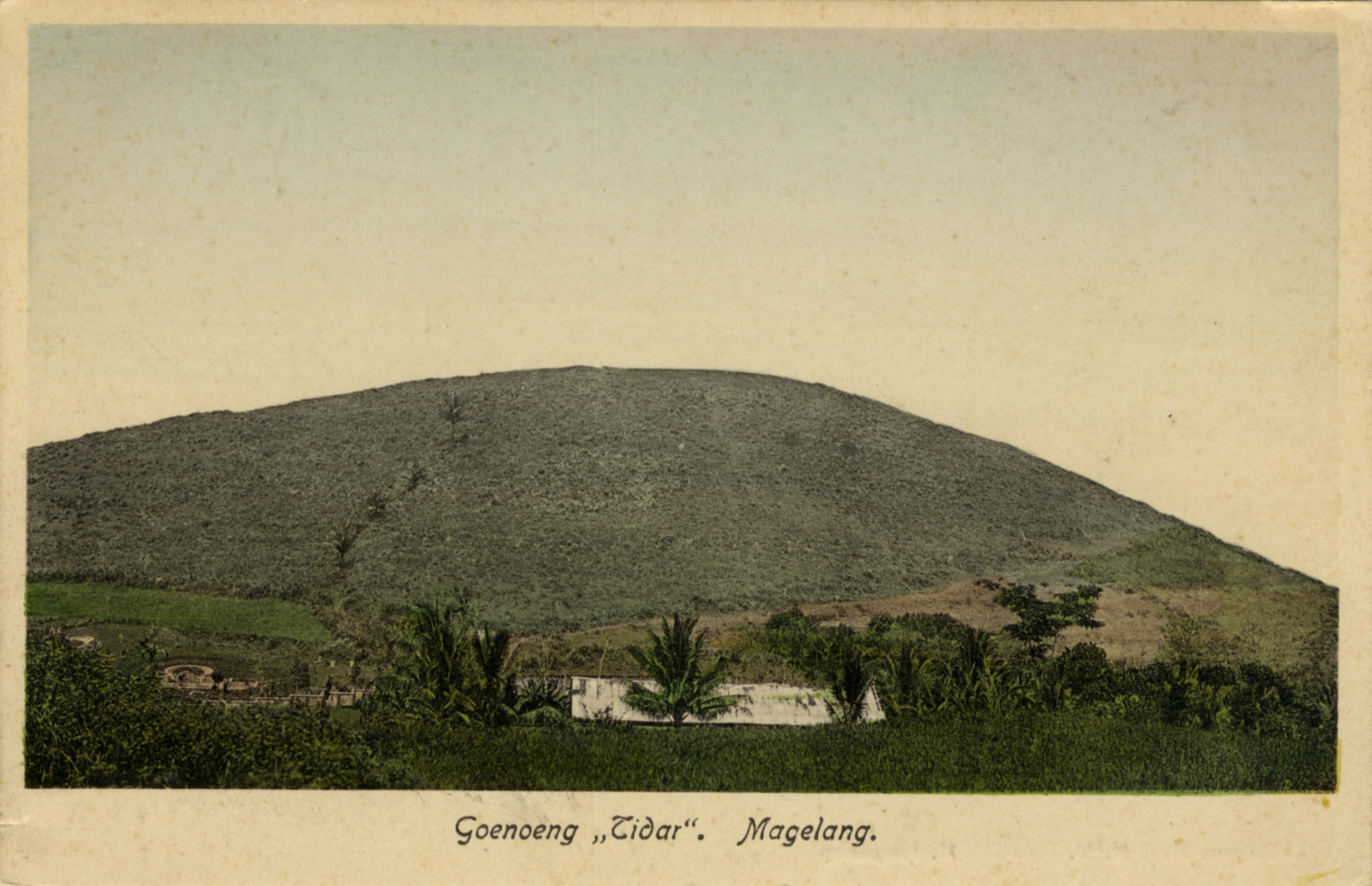
- Mount Tidar seen from Magelang City

Highest point
- Elevation: 503 m (1,650 ft)
- Coordinates: 7°29′46″S 110°13′5″E

Geography
- Location within Indonesia
- Location: Magelang, Central Java, Indonesia

Mount Tidar (Gunung Tidar in Indonesian) is a small hill in the vicinity of Magelang, Central Java, Indonesia. This mountain comes from the words mukti and kadadar. Mukti means happy, high-ranking, successful in life, while Kadadar means educated, forged, and tested. It is located in the south of Magelang, on the beginning of 40 km road to Yogyakarta. Mount Tidar is a small hill with a height of 503 meters above sea level. On the other side of the hill, there is a golf course.

A Javanese legend said that the hill is the point where the Island of Java is 'nailed' to the earth, and has been known as the Nail of Java. It is said that the gods placed the nail to prevent the Java island from tremor and sinking.

On the historic Kedu Plain and not far north from Borobudur this hill is believed to have significance and power in the network of Javanese sacred places. Although different in character and associations it can be compared to the hill on the southern slope of Mount Merapi – Turgo within the network of sacred places.

Mount Tidar hosts the Akademi Militer (Military Academy) that trains future army personnel.
