= Magelang Regency =

Regency in Central Java, Indonesia

Coordinates: 7.4275°S 110.1619°E

Magelang Regency Kabupaten Magelang
- Regency
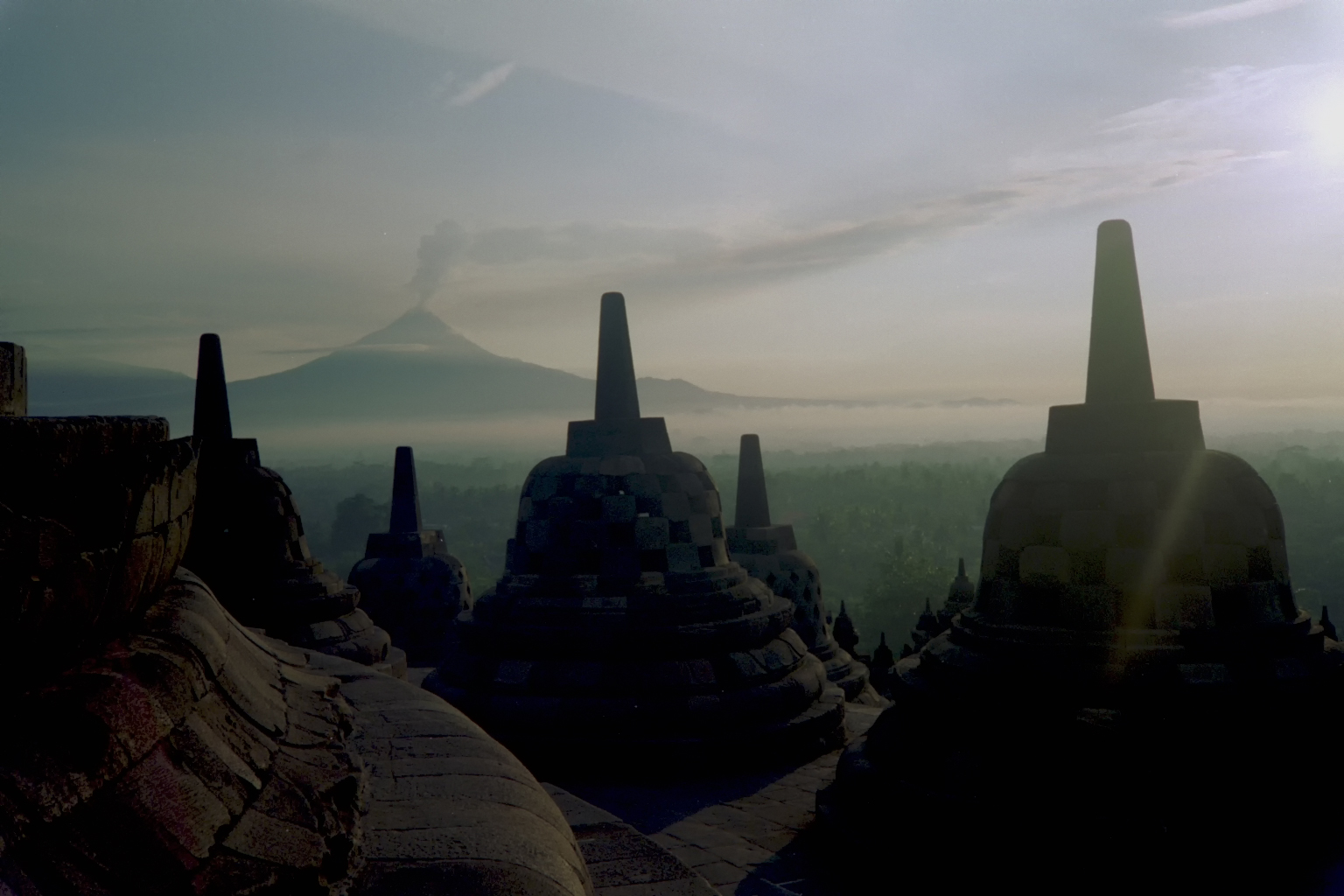
- Borobudur temple

- Coat of arms
- Nickname: De Tuin van Java
- Motto(s): Magelang Gemilang, acronym of Gemah Ripah Iman Cemerlang (Serene, Prosperous, Faithful, Shining)
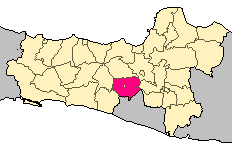
- Country: Indonesia
- Province: Central Java
- Capital: Mungkid

Government
  - Regent: Grengseng Pamuji
  - Vice Regent: Sahid

Area
  - Total: 1,129.98 km^{2} (436.29 sq mi)

Population (mid 2025 estimate)
  - Total: 1,351,952
  - Density: 1,196.44/km^{2} (3,098.76/sq mi)
- Time zone: UTC+7
- Website: magelangkab.go.id

Magelang (Javanese: ꦩꦒꦼꦭꦁ) is a regency in Central Java, Indonesia, famous for its 9th century Buddhist temple of Borobudur. Its capital is Mungkid. It covers an area of 1,129.98 km^{2} and had a population of 1,181,723 at the 2010 Census and 1,299,859 at the 2020 Census; the official estimate as at mid 2024 was 1,351,952 (comprising 679,189 males and 672,763 females). These figures exclude the autonomous city of Magelang, which is separately administered but is geographically enclaved within the regency, which borders Temanggung Regency to the north, Semarang Regency to the northeast, Boyolali Regency to the east, the Special Region of Yogyakarta to the south and southeast, Purworejo Regency to the southwest, and Wonosobo Regency to the west.

== History ==
The history of this regency is tied with the history of the city of Magelang. In 1812, Lieutenant-Governor Sir Thomas Stamford Raffles appointed Ngabel Danuningrat as the first regent of Magelang. This was a consequence of a treaty between England and Yogyakarta Sultanate on 1 August 1812 that hands over control of the Kedu region to England. As directed by his teacher, he chose an area between the Mantiasih and Gelangan village as the capital.

In 1930, a new regent was appointed, named Ngabei Danukusumo, replacing the Danuningrat dynasty who held the regent position before, and Magelang became a gemeente, together with the city of Semarang, Salatiga, and Pekalongan. The mayor position was only appointed in 1924. But, the city of Magelang was still the office of the regent. As a result, there are several regional leaders in the city of Magelang.

In 1948, the position of the regency was strengthened through UU No. 2 1948, with Magelang City being the capital. In 1950, based on UU No. 13 1950, the city was declared independent of the regency and given the right to manage its own matters, so there was a need to move the capital. There were two contenders for the capital city of Magelang Regency, namely Grabag and Muntilan, but they were rejected. On 22 March 1984, the southern Mertoyudan district and the northern Mungkid district were officially chosen as the location for the capital by the governor of Central Java, under the name of Mungkid City.

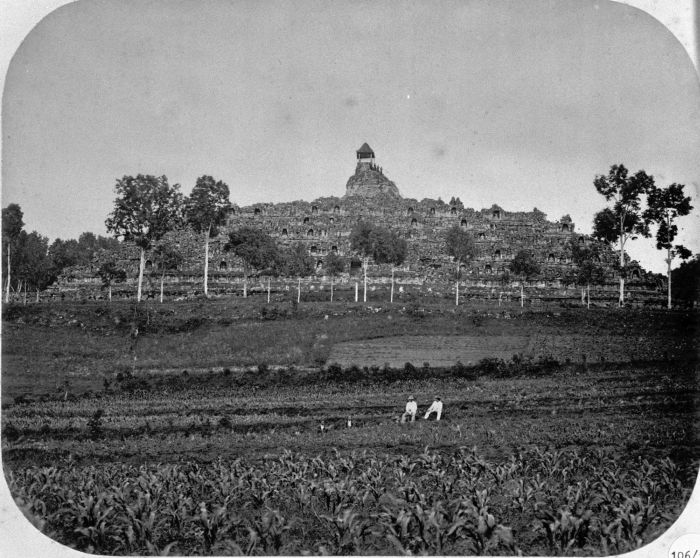
Borobudur temple in Magelang around 1866.

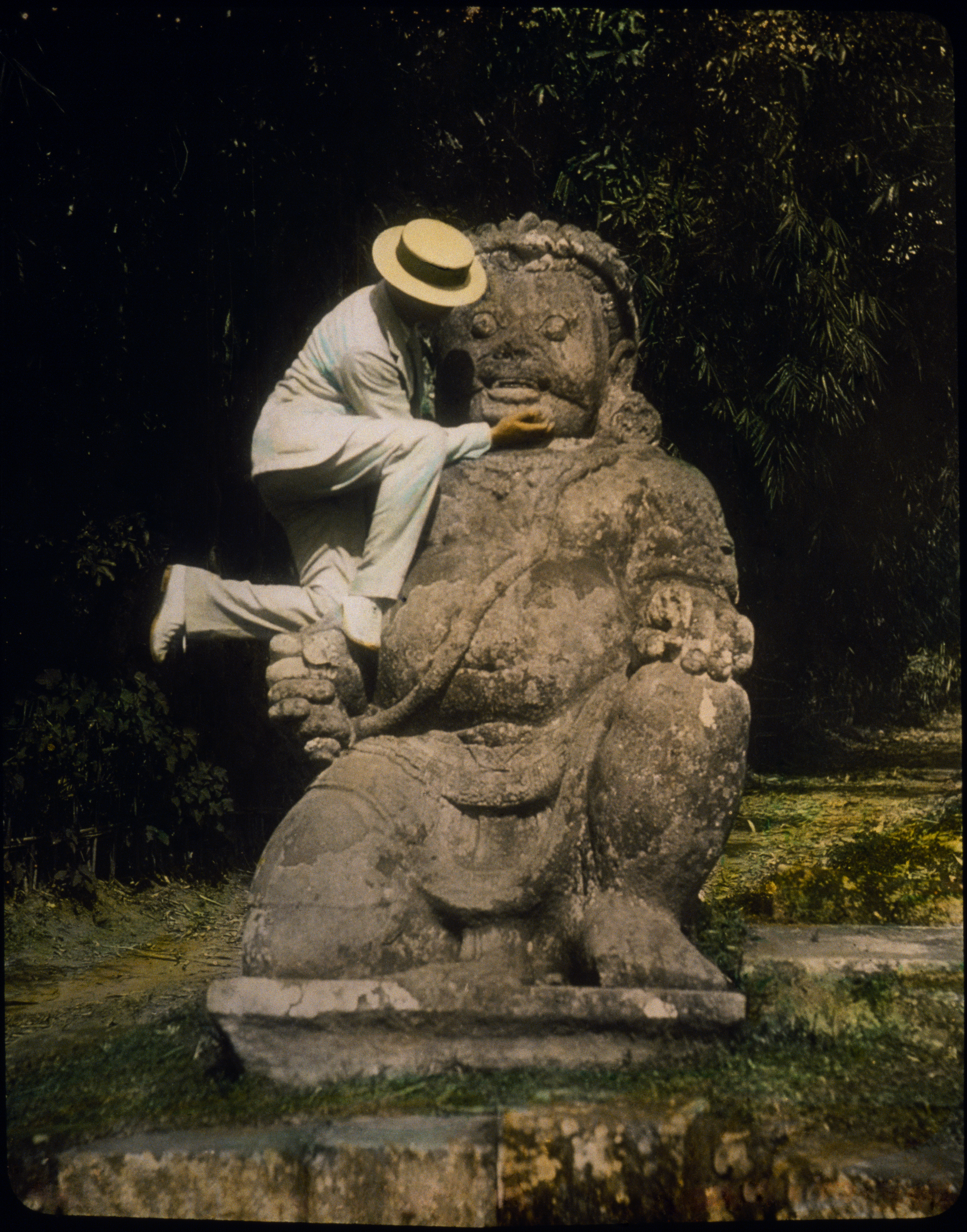
An 1895 hand-tinted lantern slide of a guardian statue at Borobudur (Photograph by William Henry Jackson). This dvarapala statue once found on Dagi Hill.

== Geography ==
Magelang Regency is located on a plateau, which is shaped like a basin, surrounded by mountains, such as Mount Merbabu, Mount Merapi and the Menoreh mountain range with the Suroloyo Peak. Many water sources originate from the mountains. Progo River and Elo River passes through the regency. Most of the area in the regency is either hilly or steep, with little flat area.

=== Geology ===
The southwestern part of the regency (Salaman and southern Borobudur district) has breccia, andesite, dacites, tuffs, and agglomerate stones, which are part of the Old Andesite Formation. Rocks from volcanoes around the regency form the Magelang plain as fertile alluvial sediment soil. In the middle of the regency, the ground is made of sediment/alluvial soil, which is weathered from rocks. Meanwhile, the ground in the slopes and foothills of the mountains are from volcanic sediments.

=== Climate ===
Magelang Regency has an average temperature of 25.62 °C (78.12 °F), with humidity at 82%, and an average of 2,589 mm (101.9 in) rainfall per year. Magelang Regency also has an average of 121 rainy days/year and an average wind speed of 1.8 knots (3.3 km/h; 2.1 mph).

== Administrative districts ==
Magelang Regency is divided into twenty-one districts (kecamatan). The districts are tabulated below with their areas and their populations at the 2010 Census and the 2020 Census, together with the official estimates as at mid 2025. The table also includes the locations of the district administrative centres, the number of villages in each district – totalling 367 rural villages (desa) and five urban villages (kelurahan) -together with the district postcodes.

Kode Wilayah	Name of District (Kecamatan)	Area in km^{2}	Pop'n Census 2010	Pop'n Census 2020	Pop'n Estimate mid 2025	Admin centre	No. of villages	Post code
33.08.01	Salaman	68.75	65,871	73,971	77,690	Salaman	20	56162 ^{(a)}
33.08.02	Borobudur	57.59	55,563	62,209	65,242	Borobudur	20	56553 ^{(b)}
33.08.03	Ngluwar	23.96	29,866	32,397	33,461	Ngluwar	8	56485
33.08.04	Salam	31.85	44,488	48,083	49,574	Salam	12	56484
33.08.05	Srumbung	61.85	44,827	48,083	49,887	Srumbung	17	56483
33.08.06	Dukun	57.60	42,931	46,574	48,105	Dukun	15	56482
33.08.08	Muntilan	30.36	74,843	79,944	81,955	Muntilan	14 ^{(c)}	56411: 56415
33.08.09	Mungkid (regency capital)	40.23	68,682	74,727	77,293	Mungkid	16 ^{(d)}	56411 & 56412
33.08.07	Sawangan	73.90	53,624	57,409	59,375	Sawangan	15	56481 ^{(e)}
33.08.15	Candimulyo	49.32	45,367	49,793	51,721	Candimulyo	19	56191
33.08.10	Mertoyudan	46.28	104,934	115,834	120,656	Mertoyudan	13 ^{(f)}	56172
33.08.11	Tempuran	47.39	46,434	52,019	54,571	Tempuran	15	56161
33.08.12	Kajoran	86.78	51,508	59,375	63,155	Kajoran	29	56163 ^{(g)}
33.08.13	Kaliangkrik	56.32	52,310	59,447	62,797	Kaliangkrik	20	56153 ^{(h)}
33.08.14	Bandongan	48.59	54,533	61,113	64,122	Bandongan	14	56151
33.08.21	Windusari	62.27	46,305	51,636	54,049	Windusari	20	56152
33.08.20	Secang	41.43	74,713	82,498	85,942	Secang	20 ^{(c)}	56195
33.08.19	Tegalrejo	38.29	53,195	55,038	55,559	Tegalrejo	21	56192
33.08.16	Pakis	67.75	52,255	54,666	55,479	Pakis	20	56193
33.08.18	Grabag	82.63	81,533	92,699	97,945	Grabag	28	56196
33.08.17	Ngablak	46.86	37,941	41,720	43,374	Ngablak	16	56194
	Totals	1,129.98	1,181,723	1,299,859	1,351,952	Mungkid	372	

Notes: (a) except the desa of Sidosari (with a postcode of 56126). (b) except the desa of Tegalarum (with a postcode of 56413).
(c) including one kelurahan (the district administrative centre). (d) including 2 kelurahan (Mendut and Sawitan).
(e) except the desa of Wonolelo (with a postcode of 56411). (f) including one kelurahan (Sumberrejo).
(g) except the desa of Pandansari (with a postcode of 56414). (h) except the desa of Balerejo (with a postcode of 56411).

== Demographics ==
Historical population
Year	Pop.	±%
1961	719,703	—
1971	830,199	+15.4%
1980	932,748	+12.4%
1990	1,015,809	+8.9%
2000	1,111,876	+9.5%
2005	1,137,938	+2.3%
2010	1,181,723	+3.8%
2015	1,244,558	+5.3%
2020	1,299,859	+4.4%
2024	1,341,447	+3.2%

Magelang Regency had a population of 1,299,859 at the 2020 Census, which was an increase of 118,136 since the 2010 census. This rose to 1,341,447 in mid 2024. The gender ratio in mid 2024 was 101.086 (males per 100 females).
