= Magelang =

City in Central Java, Indonesia

- City
- City of Magelang; Kota Magelang

Other transcription(s)
  - Hanacaraka: ꦩꦒꦼꦭꦁ
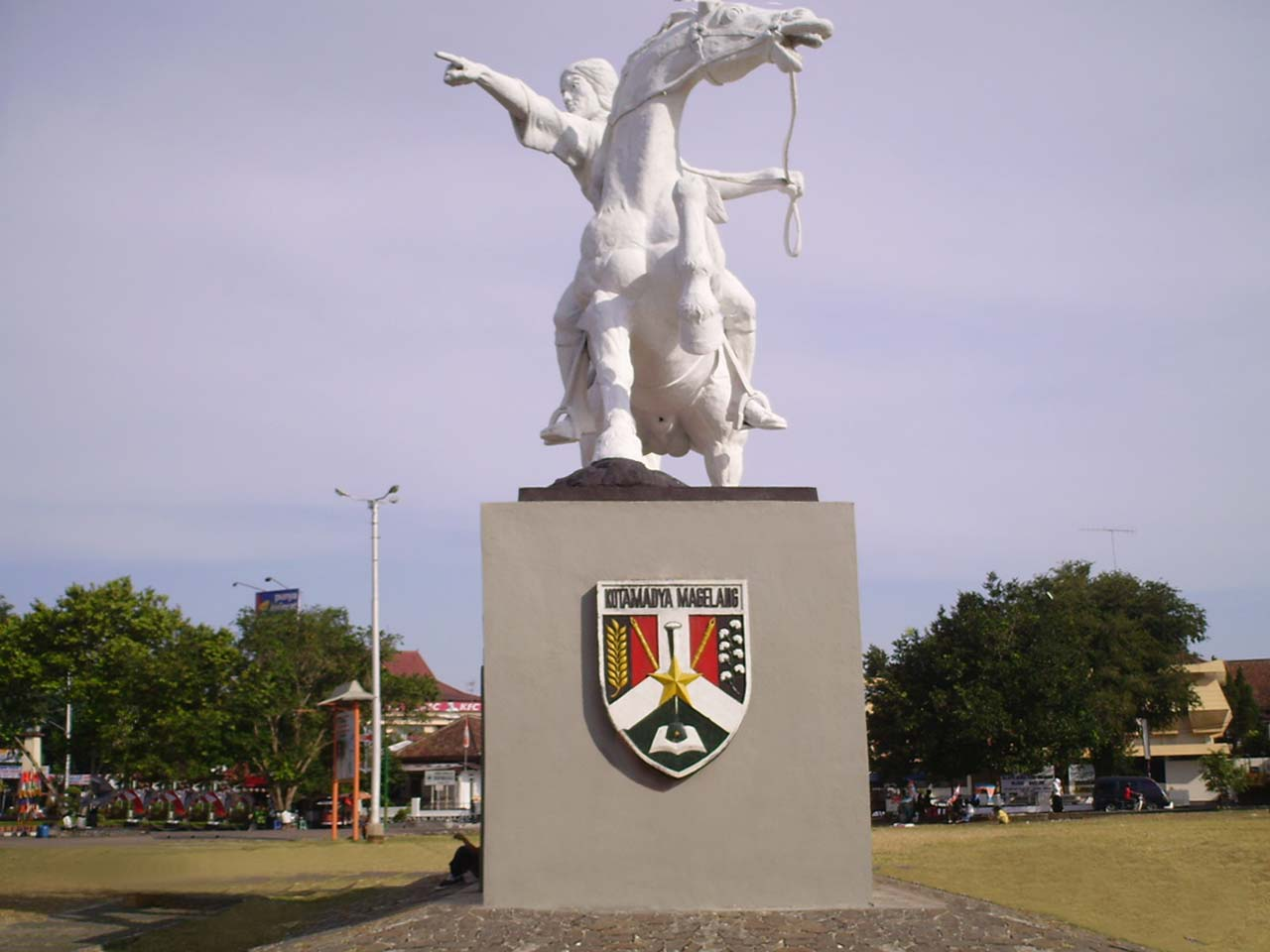
- Statue of Prince Diponegoro

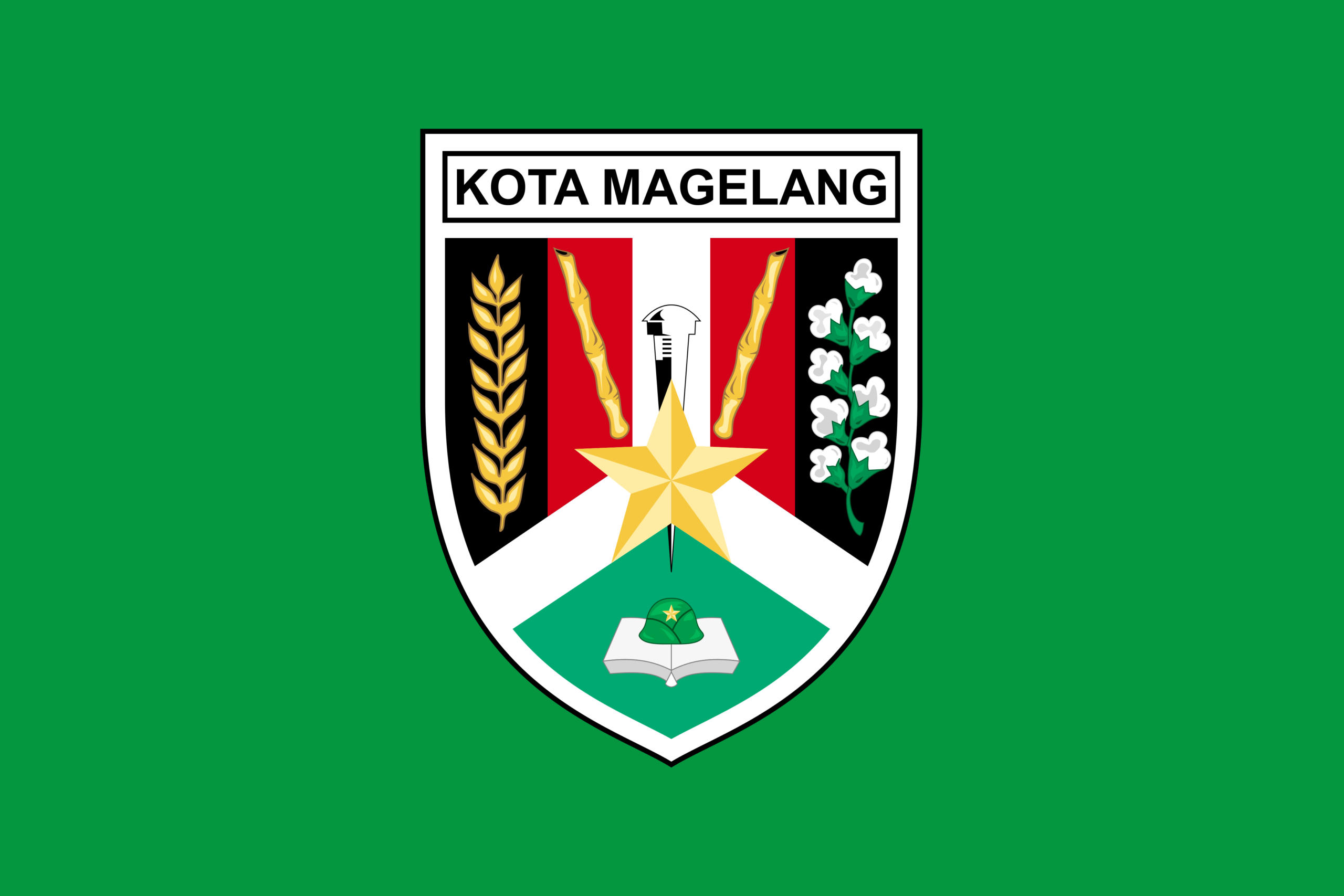
- Flag Coat of arms
- Motto(s): Magelang Kota Sejuta Bunga (Magelang, the City of a Million Flowers)
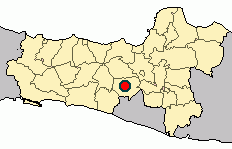
- Location within Central Java

- Location in Java and Indonesia Magelang (Indonesia)
- Coordinates: 7°28′0″S 110°13′0″E
- Country: Indonesia
- Province: Central Java
- Founded: 11 April 907
- Incorporated (as gemeente): 1 April 1906

Government
  - Mayor: Damar Prasetyono
  - Vice Mayor: Sri Harso

Area
  - Total: 18.56 km^{2} (7.17 sq mi)
- Elevation: 350 m (1,150 ft)

Population (mid 2025 estimate)
  - Total: 129,043
  - Density: 6,707/km^{2} (17,370/sq mi)
- Time zone: UTC+7 (Indonesia Western Time)
- Area code: (+62) 293
- Website: magelangkota.go.id

Magelang (Javanese: ꦩꦒꦼꦭꦁ) is one of six cities in Central Java, Indonesia, that are administratively independent of the regencies in which they lie geographically. Each of these cities is governed by a mayor rather than a bupati. Magelang City covers an area of 18.56 km^{2} and had a population of 118,227 at the 2010 census and 121,526 at the 2020 census; the official estimate as of mid 2025 was 129,043 (comprising 63,823 males and 65,220 females). It is geographically located in the middle of the Magelang Regency, between Mount Merbabu and Mount Sumbing in the south of the province, and lies 43 km north of Yogyakarta, 15 km north of Mungkid (the administrative centre of Magelang Regency) and 75 km south of Semarang (the capital of Central Java).

== History ==
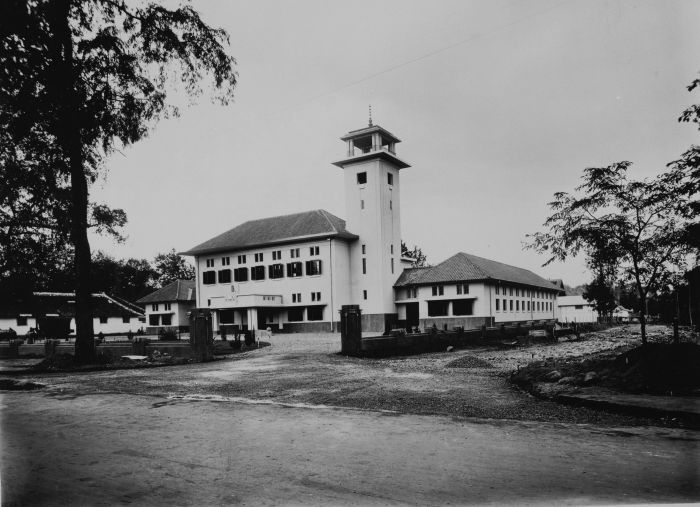
The Magelang town hall in 1925–1936

Magelang was established on 11 April 907. Magelang was then known as a village called Mantyasih, which is now known as Meteseh.

There are three steles of historical importance in Magelang, namely Poh, Gilikan, and Mantyasih, all of which are written on a plate of copper. Poh and Mantyasih were written under the rule of King Balitung of Mataram kingdom. In those steles, the villages of Mantyasih and Glanggang were mentioned. They became Meteseh and Magelang respectively.

On the Mantyasih stele, it mentioned the name of King Watukura Dyah Balitung, as well as 829 Çaka bulan Çaitra tanggal 11 Paro-Gelap Paringkelan Tungle, Pasaran Umanis hari Senais Sçara atau Sabtu, which means Saturday Legi, 11 April 907. The village Mantyasih was made by the king as a tax-free village which was led by a patih (similar to Prime Minister nowadays). Also mentioned are Mount Susundara and Mount Wukir Sumbing which is now known as Mount Sindoro and Mount Sumbing.

When Britain colonised Magelang in the eighteenth century, Magelang became the seat of the government and was made to the same level as a regency with Mas Ngabehi Danukromo as its first leader (Bupati). Mas Ngabehi Danukromo built Alun-alun (town square), bupati residence, and a mosque. Magelang became the capital of Karesidenan Kedu in 1818.

After the Dutch defeated the British, Magelang was made the center of the economy because of its strategic location. The Dutch government built a drinking water tower (known locally as Menara Air Minum) in 1918 which provides the city with water. Electricity became available in 1927. The roads were remade using asphalt.

Coat of Arms of Magelang during Dutch colonial era, granted in 1930.

The city has historically been a military post, dating back to the Dutch East Indies colonial era. It subsequently acted as an army stronghold for Indonesian pro-independence movements against the Dutch government during the resistance period. It is a host of two military landmarks: the Indonesian Military Academy, and the only military-associated school, Taruna Nusantara.

Journalist Taichiro Kajimura announced on 12 May 2007 the discovery of 30 Netherlands government documents submitted to the Tokyo tribunal as evidence of a forced mass prostitution incident by the Japanese army in 1944 in Magelang. The documents reportedly detailed how local women were coerced into serving Japanese soldiers, confirming accounts from survivors and witnesses that had long been overlooked.

After the independence of Indonesia, Magelang became kotapraja (same level as a district) and then kotamadya (same level as a city).

== Geography ==
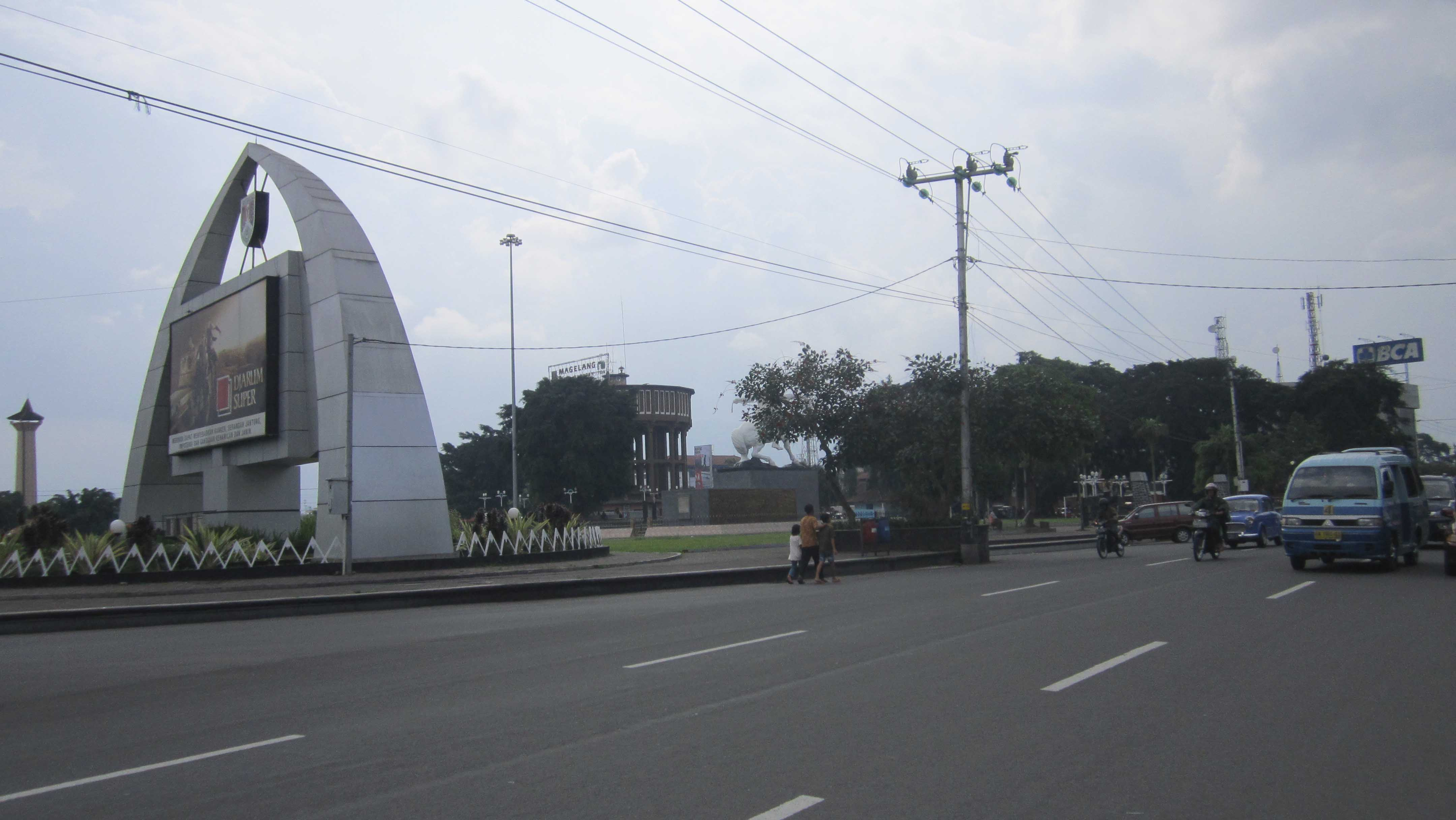
Magelang Central Park Street View

Magelang is a city which is located in a fertile agricultural area that is one of the most densely populated regions in Central Java. Magelang has two borders; the western border is the Progo River and the eastern border is the Elo River.

== Administrative districts ==
The city is divided into three districts (kecamatan) comprising 17 urban villages (kelurahan). These are listed below with their populations at the 2010 and 2020 Censuses, together with the official estimates as of mid 2025. The table also includes the locations of the district administrative centres, the number of administrative villages in each district (all classed as kelurahan), and their postcodes.

| Kode Wilayah | Name of District (kecamatan) | Area in km^{2} | Pop'n 2010 Census | Pop'n 2020 Census | Pop'n mid 2025 Estimate | Admin centre | No. of kelurahan | Post code |
|---|---|---|---|---|---|---|---|---|
| 33.71.01 | Magelang Selatan; South Magelang) | 7.14 | | 40,215 | 42,494 | Tidar Selatan | 6 | 56123 - 56126 |
| 33.71.03 | Magelang Tengah; Central Magelang) | 5.13 | | 44,225 | 48,700 | Cabacan | 6 | 56111, 56112, 56117, 56121, 56122, 56127 |
| 33.71.02 | Magelang Utara; North Magelang) | 6.29 | | 37,086 | 37,849 | Kramat Selatan | 5 | 56113 - 56116 |
| | Totals | 18.56 | 118,227 | 121,526 | 129,043 | | 17 | |

Magelang Selatan:

- Tidar Utara
- Tidar Selatan
- Rejowinangun Selatan
- Magersari
- Jurangombo Utara
- Jurangombo Selatan

Magelang Tengah:

- Magelang
- Cacaban
- Kemirirejo
- Gelangan
- Panjang
- Rejowinangun Utara

Magelang Utara:

- Kramat Utara
- Kramat Selatan
- Kedungsari
- Wates
- Potrobangsan

=== Climate ===
Climate data for Magelang
| Month | Jan | Feb | Mar | Apr | May | Jun | Jul | Aug | Sep | Oct | Nov | Dec | Year |
|---|---|---|---|---|---|---|---|---|---|---|---|---|---|
| Daily mean °C (°F) | 24.6 (76.3) | 24.6 (76.3) | 24.9 (76.8) | 25.2 (77.4) | 24.9 (76.8) | 24.4 (75.9) | 24.0 (75.2) | 24.2 (75.6) | 24.5 (76.1) | 25.1 (77.2) | 24.9 (76.8) | 24.7 (76.5) | 24.7 (76.5) |
| Average precipitation mm (inches) | 329.4 (12.97) | 311.6 (12.27) | 359.4 (14.15) | 265.8 (10.46) | 172.0 (6.77) | 76.5 (3.01) | 59.1 (2.33) | 53.8 (2.12) | 80.3 (3.16) | 163.5 (6.44) | 239.1 (9.41) | 315.5 (12.42) | 2,426 (95.51) |
| Average precipitation days | 19.4 | 18.1 | 17.6 | 14.4 | 11.0 | 8.9 | 5.3 | 5.2 | 6.0 | 8.7 | 15.0 | 18.0 | 147.6 |

== Demography ==
The people of Magelang mostly are Javanese and have a diverse set of beliefs and religions. The majority of Magelang's population follows Islam (85.68%), but there are minority groups such as Christianity (13.80%), Buddhism (0.4%), Hinduism (0.08%), and there are also spiritualism and traditional Javanese belief (0.01%).

Religion in Magelang (2021)
1. Islam (85.7%)
2. Protestantism (8.83%)
3. Roman catholic (4.97%)
4. Buddhism (0.40%)
5. Hinduism (0.08%)
6. Kejawen (0.01%)
7. Confucianism (0.00%)

Based on the 2020 census, Magelang had a total population of 121,526. Magelang's population was 60,234 men (49% of the total population) and 61,292 women (51% of the total population). By mid-2024, this had increased to 128,709 inhabitants (63,612 males and 65,097 females).

Metropolitan Magelang includes numerous urbanised parts of the neighbouring districts within Magelang Regency. The metropolitan area had 311,110 inhabitants at the 1990 Census.

== Places of interest ==
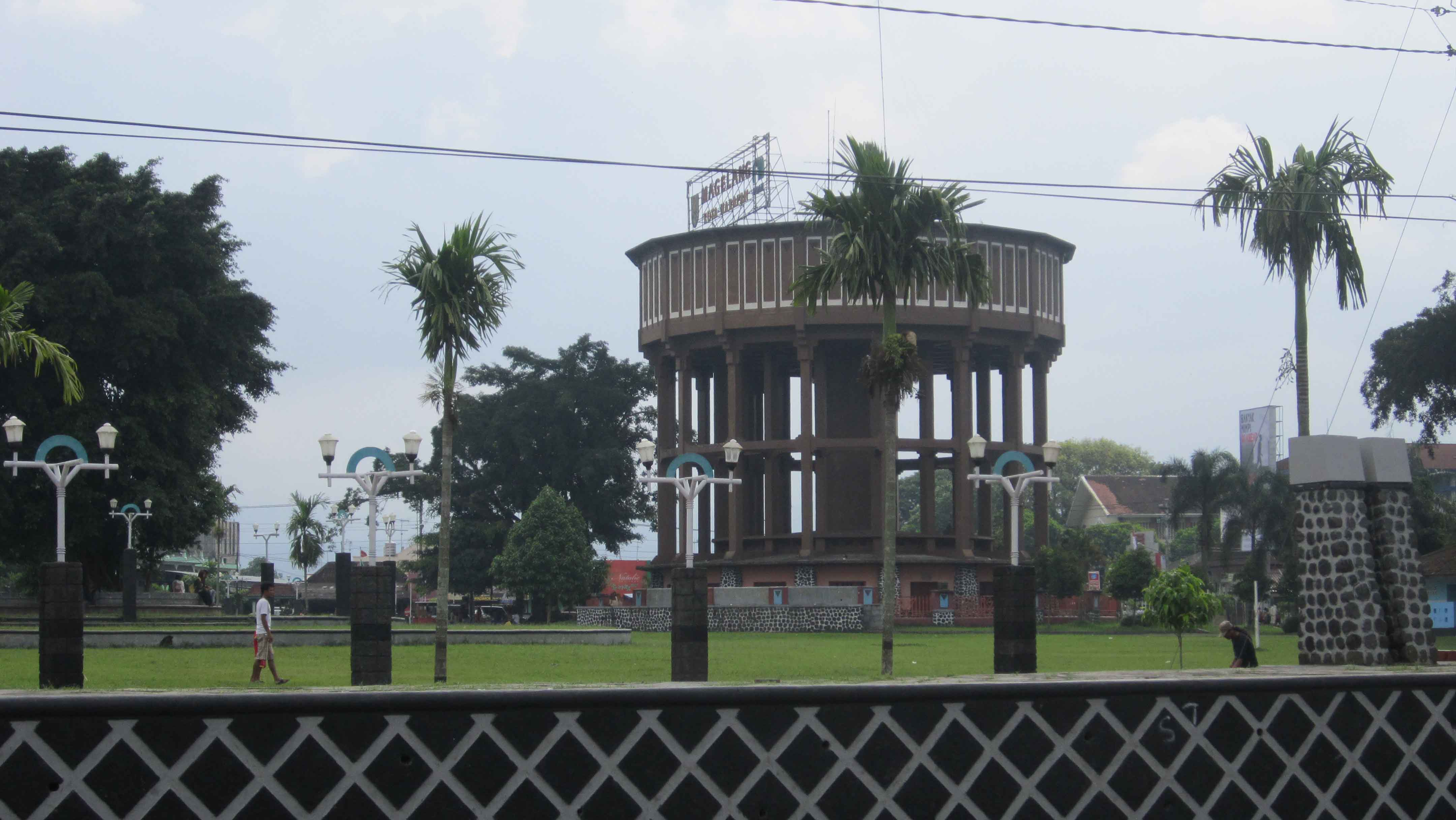
Magelang Big Stove - Water Container

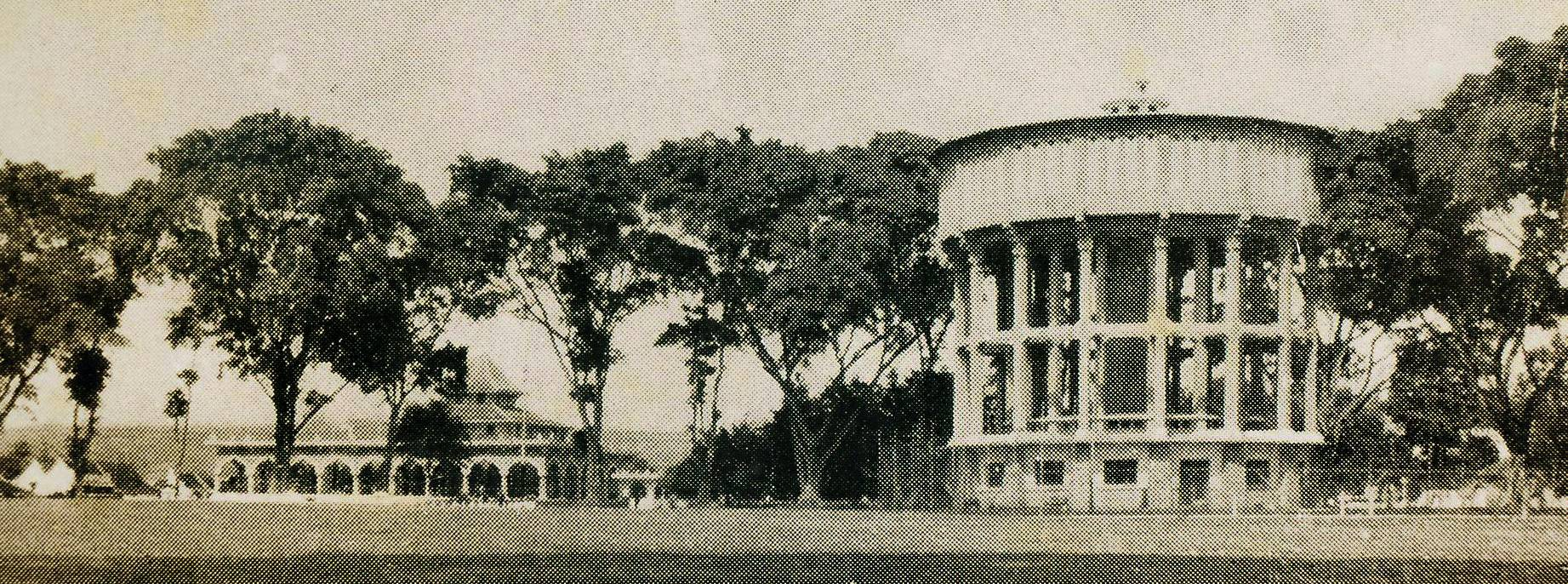
Magelang Big Stove - Water Container - 1925

=== Temples ===
Magelang is the closest major town to Borobudur, a ninth-century Buddhist monument located about 40 km (25 mi) northwest of Yogyakarta. Just 12 km from the town centre is Candi Selogriyo, an eighth-century Hindu temple near the village of Candisari. The Canggal Temple (Gunung Wukir Temple), also located in the Magelang regency, has a Sanskrit transcription bearing the name of the first Mataram kingdom ruler, Sanjaya.

=== Rafting ===
There is white water rafting on the Elo River, located in the district of Magelang. The Elo River disgorges from Mount Merbabu, Mount Telomoyo, and Mount Ungaran, so it is not affected by the flow of volcanic material from Mount Merapi. The river is ideal for white water rafting because the characteristics of flow and flooding are relatively stable, so it is relatively safe to be forded in both the dry and rainy seasons. Running rafting chosen difficulty level (grade) maximum III + and suitable for families. The track has a length of about 12.5 km and is reached in 2.5 – 3 hours of rafting.

=== Museums ===
A number of the town's buildings from the Dutch East Indies era have become heritage landmarks. The Karesidenan Kedu building is now known as Museum Kamar Pengabdian Diponegoro, where Prince Diponegoro was arrested by the Dutch colonial government during the Java War (1825–1830). The chair on which the Prince sat remains in the museum. A fingernail, believed to be Diponegoro's, remains on the arm of the chair. A statue in his honour stands in Magelang's town square.

=== Jalan Pemuda ===
Jalan Pemuda ("Youth Street") is Magelang's Pecinan (Chinatown). The one-way 1.5-kilometre-long (0.93 mi) road is the centre of business and includes shops, a minimarket, and restaurants. The road, running along a former railroad, is divided with a narrow section reserved for rickshaws.

=== Alun-alun (town square) ===
The alun-alun or town square is located in the city centre. The area has the Matahari and Gardena department stores, Magelang's only cinema, to the north, the Trio Plaza and the BCA tower; in the south, a police station, the BPD Bank building, and a Confucian temple along Jalan Pemuda. In the west, lies the city's largest mosque, locally known as Kauman. Within the vicinity of the town square is a 15-metre-high (49 ft) water tower, and also a statue of Diponegoro riding a horse.

=== Sports ===
There are several sports venues in Magelang. In 2006, for example, a golf course was opened: the Borobudur International Golf and Country Club. The Abu Bakrin football stadium is located on Jl. Tidar, which is near the golf course. Besides, the Gedung Olah Raga "Samapta" is a popular sports venue in the sub-district of North Magelang. The area is being developed because of the plan to raise its status to the Sports Centre of Central Java. It is located in the east of the Progo River. Stadion Gemilang Kabupaten Magelang is located in the town of Blondo. It has a capacity of 15,000 and it is used mostly for football matches.

=== Parks ===
A 28-hectare park, Kyai Langgeng, is located at Cempaka Street approximately one kilometer south of the city centre. Research is undertaken on rare plant species here. The park has a playground for children and their families. The river Progo is accessible from this park.

Badaan park is located in Jalan Pahlawan (Pahlawan Road) and one of two parks in Magelang. The park is smaller than Kyai Langgeng and mostly regarded as a children's playground. There are animal statues within the park such as the rhino the animal used as its namesake, the elephant, and the giraffe. Hawkers sell a variety of bakso (Meatballs) in the vicinity of the park.

=== Mount Tidar ===
Mount Tidar is located in Magersari, South Magelang, and is located within the complex of the Indonesian Military Academy. This mountain comes from the words mukti and kadadar. Mukti means happy, high-ranking, successful in life, while Kadadar means educated, forged, and tested. The mountain hosts the remains of Syekh Subakir from Iran.

=== Universities ===
Although Magelang City is small city, it has several universities, colleges, and academies. At least, there are six universities located in Magelang City such as Indonesian Military Academy (Akmil), Muhammadiyah University of Magelang (Unimma), Tidar University (Untidar), STMIK Bina Patria, and Tirta Wiyata Engineering Academy (Akademi Teknik Tirta Wiyata) and the branch campus of the Health Polytechnic of the Ministry of Health, Semarang.

== Transportation ==
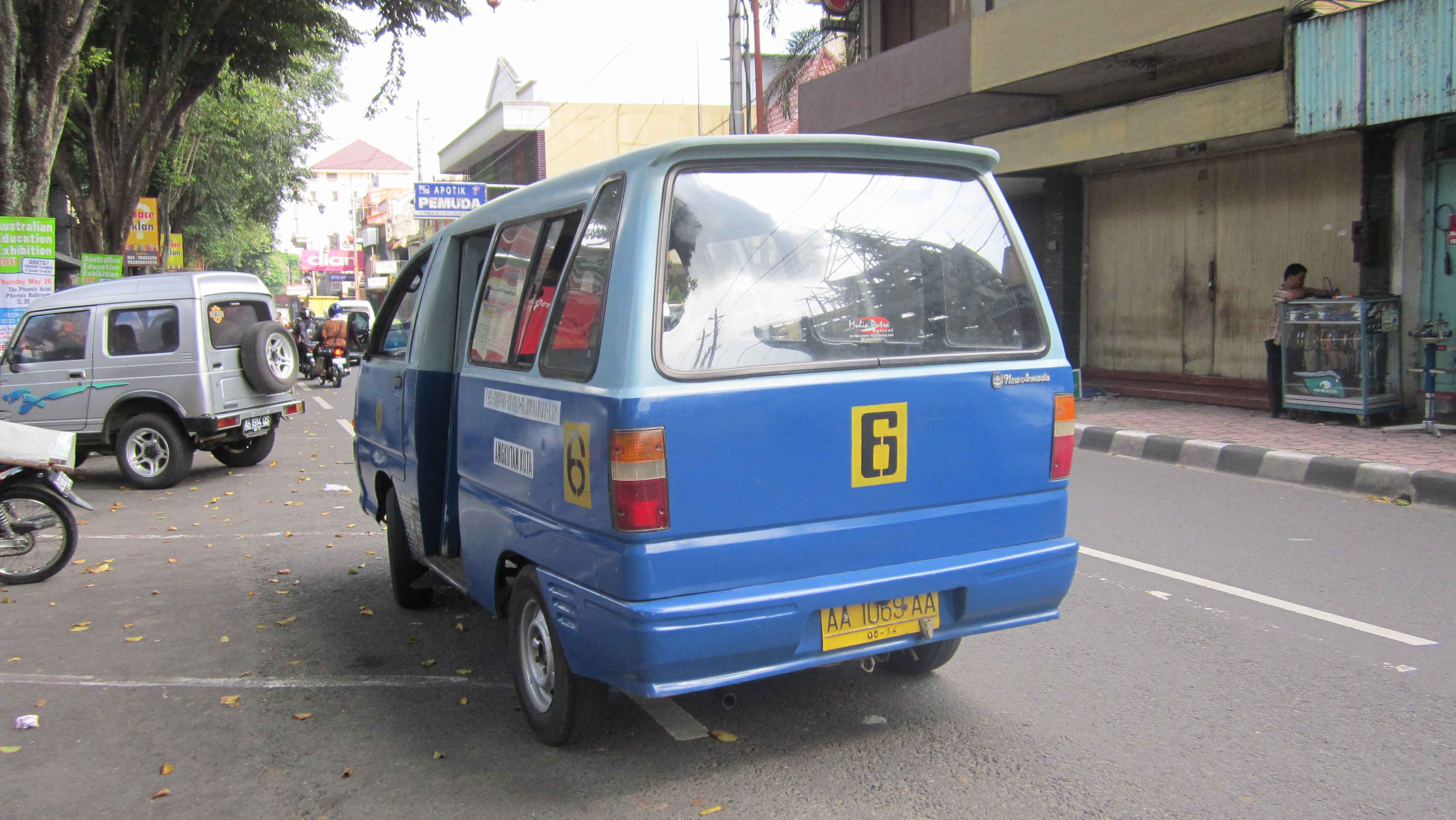
Jalur 6, one of Magelang's mass public transport

The main transportation which are operating in Magelang are cars, motorcycles, buses, paddy cabs, becak, and bicycles. Today, the most popular of them are cars and motorcycles. Even almost all of the households have a motorcycle as a means of mobility in daily activity. Then, public transportation is mainly using buses and cars.

Magelang used to have a railway track from Semarang to Yogyakarta passing at its centre (along Jalan Pemuda), but has since been redirected outside the city. Unfortunately, today the railway track does not function again. It was closed by the government due to the operational cost at that time.

Magelang does not have an airport and therefore relies on Yogyakarta's Adisutjipto International Airport, Surakarta's Adisumarmo International Airport, and Semarang's Achmad Yani International Airport. Then, to reach the airport, especially Adisucipto, from Magelang takes about one hour by bus car, or taxi. But today the easier way to reach Adi Sucipto International Airport in Yogyakarta is by using DAMRI buses that are specially operated to carry people from Magelang to Adi Sucipto Airport and its way back.

Following lava flows from Mount Merapi through the Kali Putih River in Gempol in 2011, the main road connecting Magelang and Yogyakarta has closed several times. An estimated Rp.64 billion ($7.3 million) project to build a bridge over the river, a 2.3 kilometer-long stream dredge and land acquisition is being built by the government.

== Motto ==
Magelang's motto is HARAPAN (in English: Hope). It is made of "Hidup", "Aman", "RAPi", "Asri" dan "Nyaman" (in English: living, safe, tidy, green, and comfort)

== Gallery ==
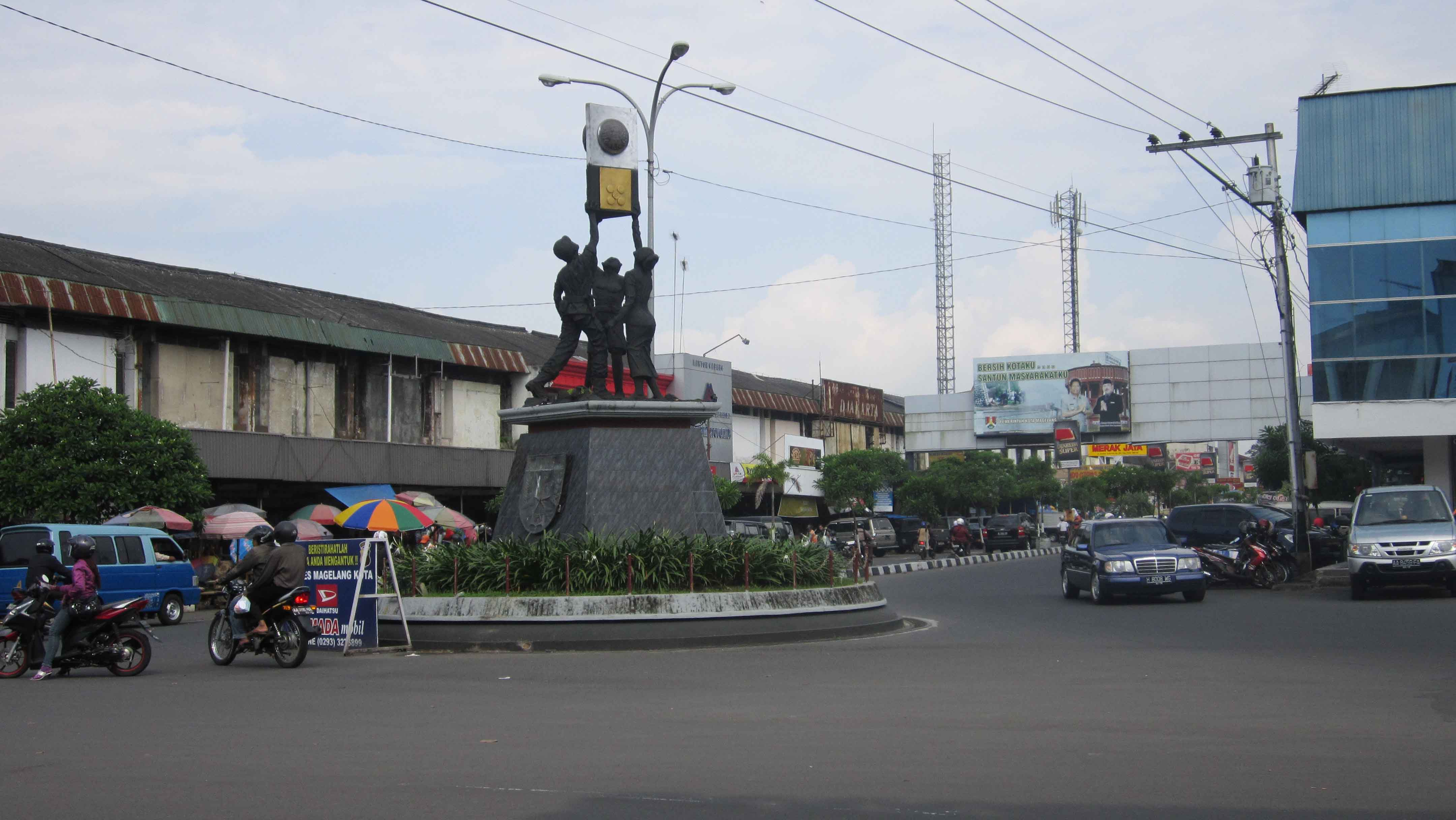
Magelang shopping center

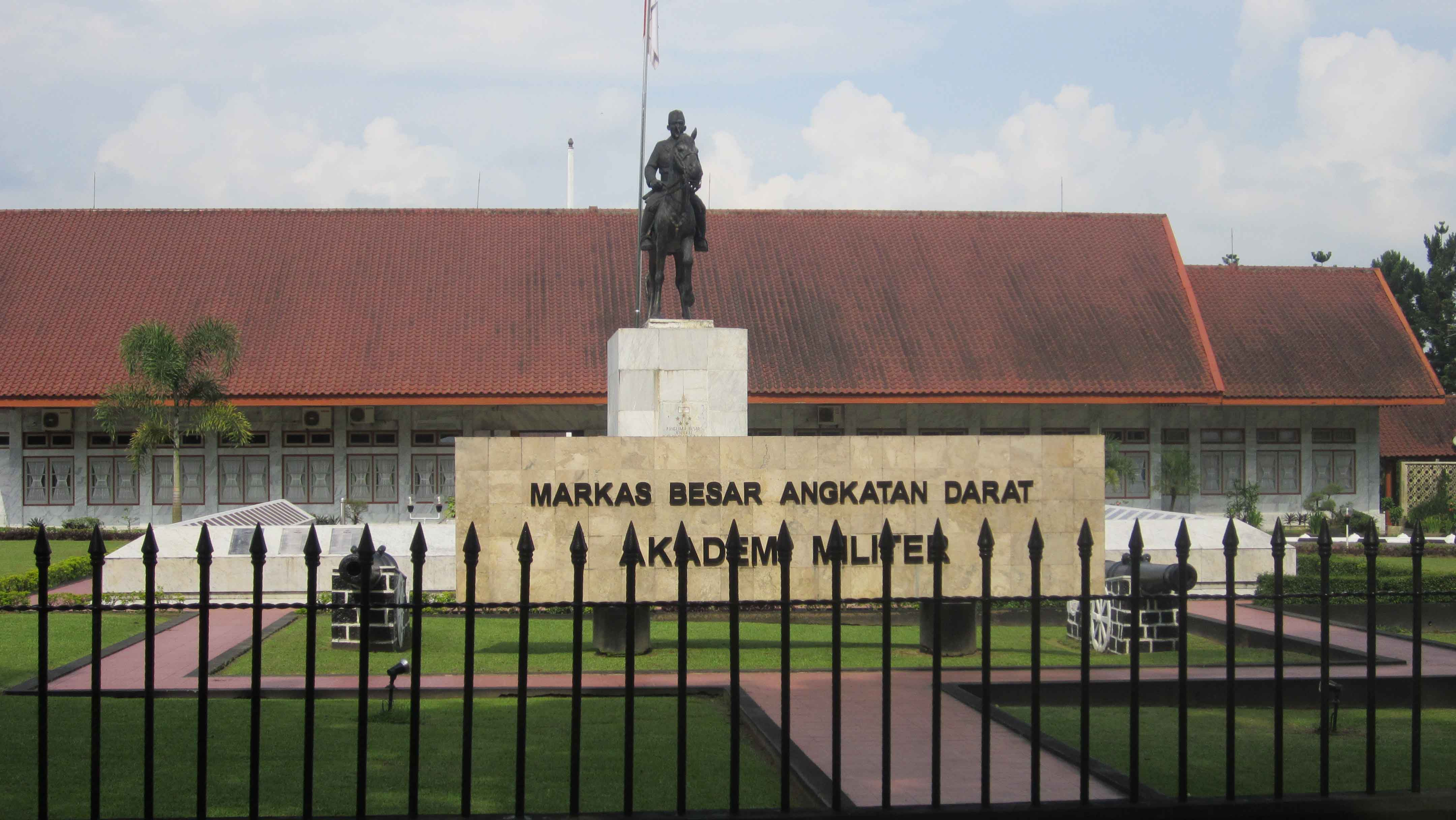
The front of the Military Academy

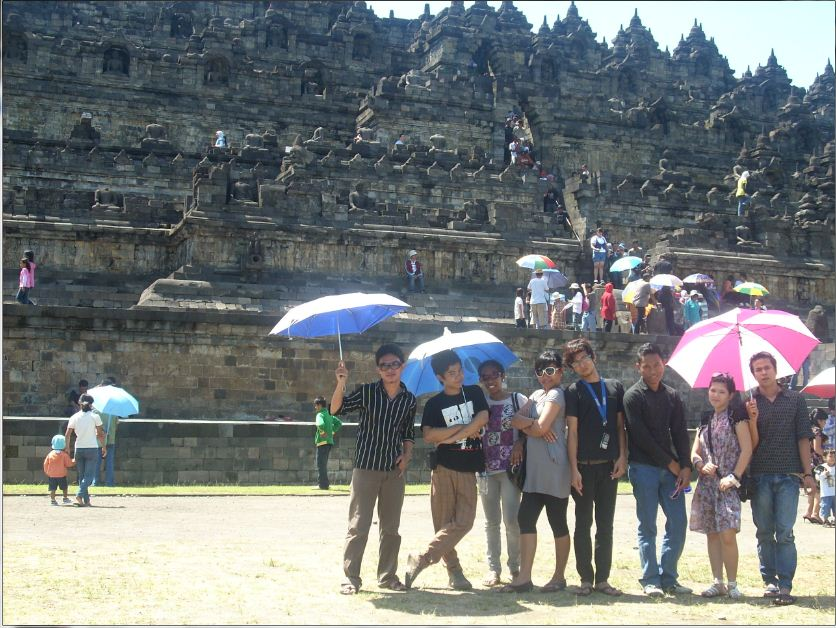
The north yard of Borobudur Temple

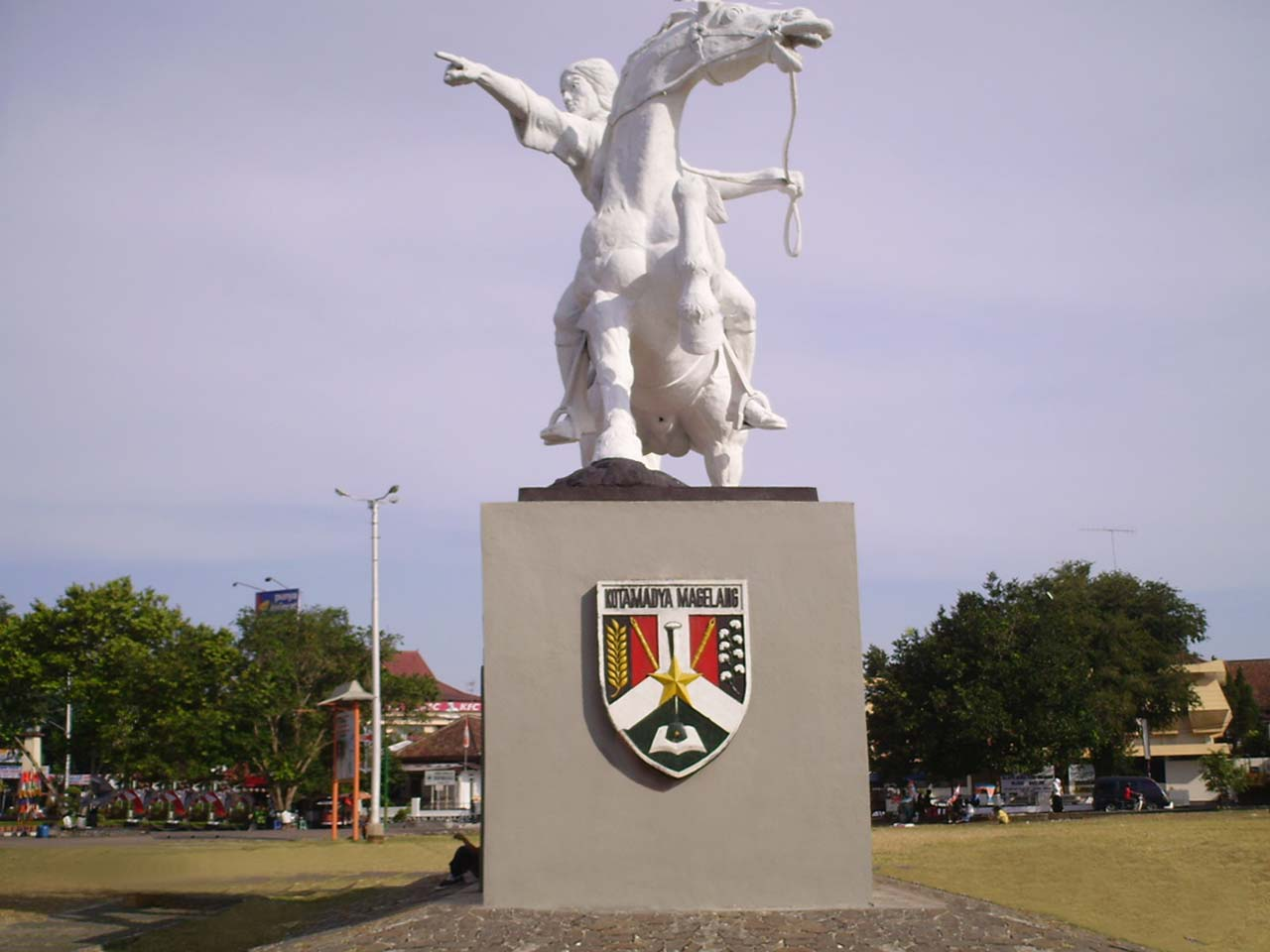
Magelang central park

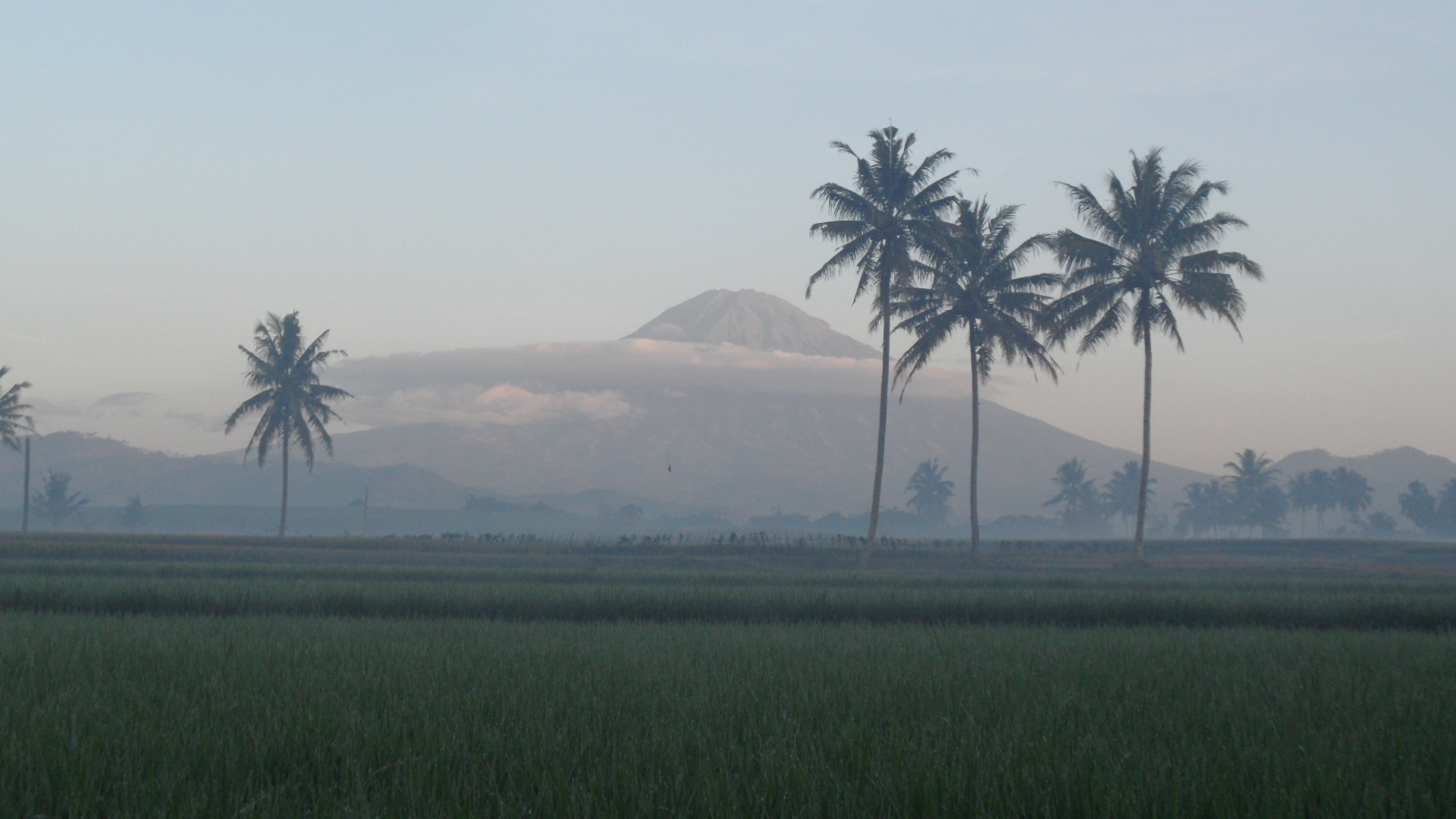
Silhouette of Mount Sumbing from Bondowoso, Mertoyudan

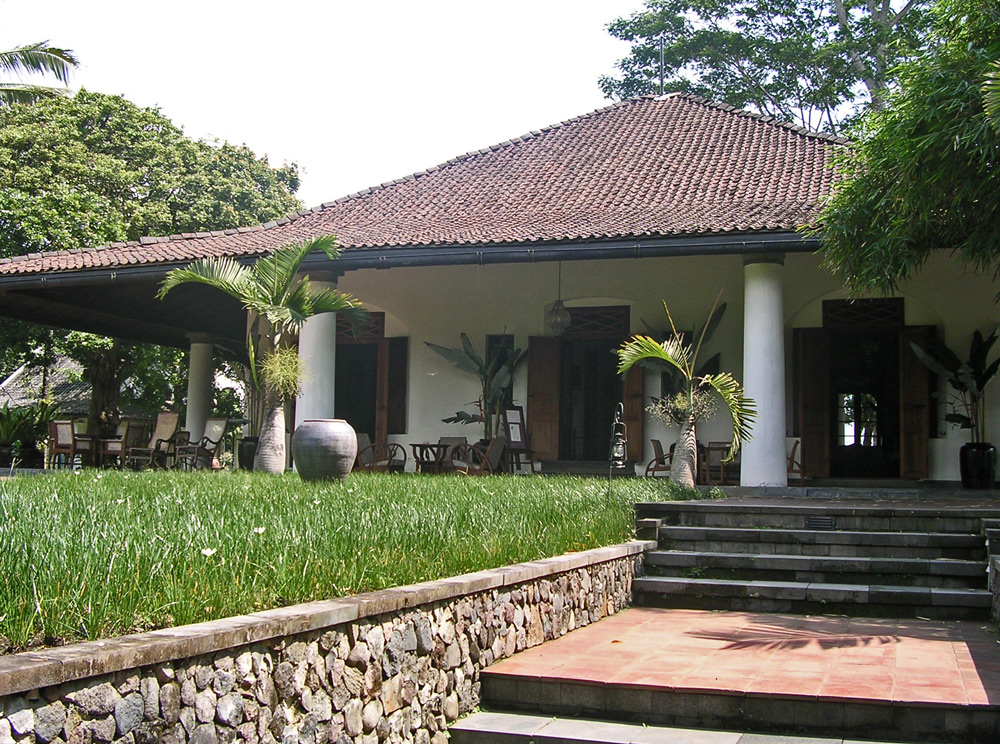
19th century Indo-European hybrid plantation villa. Now part of Losari resort

== See also ==
- List of cities of Indonesia
