= List of districts of Central Java =

The province of Central Java in Indonesia is divided into kota (cities) and kabupaten (regencies) which in turn are divided administratively into kecamatan (districts).

The districts of Central Java with the city or regency each falls into are as follows:

- Adimulyo, Kebumen
- Adipala, Cilacap
- Adiwerna, Tegal
- Ajibarang, Banyumas
- Alian, Kebumen
- Ambal, Kebumen
- Ambarawa, Semarang
- Ampel, Boyolali
- Ampelgading, Pemalang
- Andong, Boyolali
- Argomulyo, City of Salatiga
- Ayah, Kebumen
- Bae, Kudus
- Bagelen, Purworejo
- Baki, Sukoharjo
- Balapulang, Tegal
- Bancak, Semarang
- Bandar, Batang
- Bandongan, Magelang
- Bandungan, Semarang
- Bangsri, Jepara
- Banjarejo, Blora
- Banjarharjo, Brebes
- Banjarmangu, Banjarnegara
- Banjarnegara, Banjarnegara
- Banjarsari, City of Surakarta
- Bansari, Temanggung
- Bantarbolang, Pemalang
- Bantarkawung, Brebes
- Bantarsari, Cilacap
- Banyubiru, Semarang
- Banyudono, Boyolali
- Banyumanik, City of Semarang
- Banyumas, Banyumas
- Banyuputih, Batang
- Banyuurip, Purworejo
- Batang, Batang
- Batangan, Pati
- Batealit, Jepara
- Batur, Banjarnegara
- Baturraden, Banyumas
- Baturetno, Wonogiri
- Batuwarno, Wonogiri
- Bawang, Banjarnegara
- Bawang, Batang
- Bawen, Semarang
- Bayan, Purworejo
- Bayat, Klaten
- Bejen, Temanggung
- Belik, Pemalang
- Bendosari, Sukoharjo
- Bener, Purworejo
- Bergas, Semarang
- Binangun, Cilacap
- Blado, Batang
- Blora, Blora
- Bobotsari, Purbalingga
- Bodeh, Pemalang
- Bogorejo, Blora
- Boja, Kendal
- Bojong, Pekalongan
- Bojong, Tegal
- Bojongsari, Purbalingga
- Bonang, Demak
- Bonorowo, Kebumen
- Borobudur, Magelang
- Boyolali, Boyolali
- Brangsong, Kendal
- Brati, Grobogan
- Brebes, Brebes
- Bringin, Semarang
- Bruno, Purworejo
- Buaran, Kebumen
- Buaran, Pekalongan
- Buayan, Kebumen
- Bukateja, Purbalingga
- Bulakamba, Brebes
- Bulu, Rembang
- Bulu, Sukoharjo
- Bulu, Temanggung
- Bulukerto, Wonogiri
- Bulupesantren, Kebumen
- Bumiayu, Brebes
- Bumijawa, Tegal
- Butuh, Purworejo
- Candimulyo, Magelang
- Candiroto, Temanggung
- Candisari, Semarang
- Cawas, Klaten
- Ceper, Klaten
- Cepiring, Kendal
- Cepogo, Boyolali
- Cepu, Blora
- Cilacap Selatan, Cilacap
- Cilacap Tengah, Cilacap
- Cilacap Utara, Cilacap
- Cilongok, Banyumas
- Cimanggu, Cilacap
- Cipari, Cilacap
- Cluwak, Pati
- Colomadu, Karanganyar
- Comal, Pemalang
- Dawe, Kudus
- Dayeuhluhur, Cilacap
- Delanggu, Klaten
- Demak, Demak
- Dempet, Demak
- Doro, Pekalongan
- Dukuhseti, Pati
- Dukuhturi, Tegal
- Dukuhwaru, Tegal
- Dukun, Magelang
- Eromoko, Wonogiri
- Gabus, Grobogan
- Gabus, Pati
- Gajah, Demak
- Gajahmungkur, Semarang
- Gandrungmangu, Cilacap
- Gantiwarno, Klaten
- Garung, Wonosobo
- Gatak, Sukoharjo
- Gayamsari, Semarang
- Gebang, Purworejo
- Gebog, Kudus
- Gemawang, Temanggung
- Gembong, Pati
- Gemolong, Sragen
- Gemuh, Kendal
- Genuk, Semarang
- Gesi, Sragen
- Getasan, Semarang
- Geyer, Grobogan
- Girimarto, Wonogiri
- Giritontro, Wonogiri
- Giriwoyo, Wonogiri
- Godong, Grobogan
- Gombong, Kebumen
- Gondang, Sragen
- Gondangrejo, Karanganyar
- Grabag, Magelang
- Grabag, Purworejo
- Gringsing, Batang
- Grobogan, Grobogan
- Grogol, Sukoharjo
- Gubug, Grobogan
- Gumelar, Banyumas
- Gunem, Rembang
- Guntur, Demak
- Gunungpati, Semarang
- Gunungwungkal, Pati
- Jaken, Pati
- Jakenan, Pati
- Jambu, Semarang
- Japah, Blora
- Jaten, Karanganyar
- Jati, Blora
- Jati, Kudus
- Jatibarang, Brebes
- Jatilawang, Banyumas
- Jatinegara, Tegal
- Jatinom, Klaten
- Jatipurno, Wonogiri
- Jatipuro, Karanganyar
- Jatiroto, Wonogiri
- Jatisrono, Wonogiri
- Jatiyoso, Karanganyar
- Jebres, Surakarta
- Jekulo, Kudus
- Jenar, Sragen
- Jenawi, Karanganyar
- Jepara, Jepara
- Jepon, Blora
- Jeruklegi, Cilacap
- Jiken, Blora
- Jogonalan, Klaten
- Jumapolo, Karanganyar
- Jumatono, Karanganyar
- Jumo, Temanggung
- Juwana, Pati
- Juwangi, Boyolali
- Juwiring, Klaten
- Kajen, Pekalongan
- Kajoran, Magelang
- Kaliangkrik, Magelang
- Kalibagor, Banyumas
- Kalibawang, Wonosobo
- Kalibening, Banjarnegara
- Kaligesing, Purworejo
- Kaligondang, Purbalingga
- Kalijambe, Sragen
- Kalikajar, Wonosobo
- Kalikotes, Klaten
- Kalimanah, Purbalingga
- Kalinyamatan, Jepara
- Kaliori, Rembang
- Kaliwiro, Wonosobo
- Kaliwungu Selatan, Kendal
- Kaliwungu, Kendal
- Kaliwungu, Kudus
- Kaliwungu, Semarang
- Kaloran, Temanggung
- Kampung Laut, Cilacap
- Kandangan, Temanggung
- Kandangserang, Pekalongan
- Kandeman, Batang
- Kangkung, Kendal
- Karanganom, Klaten
- Karanganyar, Demak
- Karanganyar, Kebumen
- Karanganyar, Pekalongan
- Karanganyar, Purbalingga
- Karangawen, Demak
- Karangdadap, Pekalongan
- Karangdowo, Klaten
- Karanggayam, Kebumen
- Karanggede, Boyolali
- Karangjambu, Purbalingga
- Karangkobar, Banjarnegara
- Karanglewas, Banyumas
- Karangmalang, Sragen
- Karangmoncol, Purbalingga
- Karangnongko, Klaten
- Karangpandan, Karanganyar
- Karangpucung, Cilacap
- Karangrayung, Grobogan
- Karangreja, Purbalingga
- Karangsambung, Kebumen
- Karangtengah, Demak
- Karangtengah, Wonogiri
- Karanganyar, Karanganyar
- Karimunjawa, Jepara
- Kartasura, Sukoharjo
- Kawunganten, Cilacap
- Kayen, Pati
- Kebakkramat, Karanganyar
- Kebasen, Banyumas
- Kebonagung, Demak
- Kebonarum, Klaten
- Kebumen, Kebumen
- Kedawung, Sragen
- Kedu, Temanggung
- Kedung, Jepara
- Kedungbanteng, Banyumas
- Kedungbanteng, Tegal
- Kedungjati, Grobogan
- Kedungreja, Cilacap
- Kedungtuban, Blora
- Kedungwuni, Pekalongan
- Kejajar, Wonosobo
- Kejobong, Purbalingga
- Keling, Jepara
- Kemalang, Klaten
- Kemangkon, Purbalingga
- Kembang, Jepara
- Kembaran, Banyumas
- Kemiri, Purworejo
- Kemranjen, Banyumas
- Kemusu, Boyolali
- Kendal, Kendal
- Kerjo, Karanganyar
- Kepil, Wonosobo
- Kersana, Brebes
- Kertanegara, Purbalingga
- Kertek, Wonosobo
- Kesesi, Pekalongan
- Kesugihan, Cilacap
- Ketanggungan, Brebes
- Kismantoro, Wonogiri
- Klambu, Grobogan
- Klaten Selatan, Klaten
- Klaten Tengah, Klaten
- Klaten Utara, Klaten
- Kledung, Temanggung
- Klego, Boyolali
- Klirong, Kebumen
- Kradenan, Blora
- Kradenan, Grobogan
- Kragan, Rembang
- Kramat, Tegal
- Kranggan, Temanggung
- Kroya, Cilacap
- Kudus, Kudus
- Kunduran, Blora
- Kutasari, Purbalingga
- Kutoarjo, Purworejo
- Kutowinangun, Kebumen
- Kuwarasan, Kebumen
- Larangan, Brebes
- Lasem, Rembang
- Lawiyan, Surakarta
- Lebakbarang, Pekalongan
- Lebaksiu, Tegal
- Leksono, Wonosobo
- Limbangan, Kendal
- Limpung, Batang
- Loano, Purworejo
- Losari, Brebes
- Lumbir, Banyumas
- Madukara, Banjarnegara
- Magelang Selatan, City of Magelang
- Magelang Tengah, Magelang
- Magelang Utara, Magelang
- Majenang, Cilacap
- Mandiraja, Banjarnegara
- Manisrenggo, Klaten
- Manyaran, Wonogiri
- Maos, Cilacap
- Margadana, City of Tegal
- Margasari, Tegal
- Margorejo, Pati
- Margoyoso, Pati
- Martoyudan, Magelang
- Masaran, Sragen
- Matesih, Karanganyar
- Mayong, Jepara
- Mejobo, Kudus
- Mijen, Demak
- Mijen, Semarang
- Miri, Sragen
- Mirit, Kebumen
- Mlonggo, Jepara
- Moga, Pemalang
- Mojogedang, Karanganyar
- Mojolaban, Sukoharjo
- Mojosongo, Boyolali
- Mojotengah, Wonosobo
- Mondokan, Sragen
- Mranggen, Demak
- Mrebet, Purbalinga
- Mungkid, Magelang
- Muntilan, Magelang
- Musuk, Boyolali
- Nalumsari, Jepara
- Ngablak, Magelang
- Ngadirejo, Temanggung
- Ngadirojo, Wonogiri
- Ngaliyan, Semarang
- Ngampel, Kendal
- Ngaringan, Grobogan
- Ngawen, Blora
- Ngawen, Klaten
- Ngemplak, Boyolali
- Ngluwar, Magelang
- Ngombol, Purworejo
- Ngrampal, Sragen
- Ngargoyoso, Karanganyar
- Nguntoronadi, Wonogiri
- Nguter, Sukoharjo
- Nogosari, Boyolali
- Nusawungu, Cilacap
- Pabelan, Semarang
- Padamara, Purbalingga
- Padureso, Kebumen
- Pagentan, Banjarnegara
- Pagerbarang, Tegal
- Pagerruyung, Kendal
- Paguyangan, Brebes
- Pakis, Magelang
- Pamotan, Rembang
- Pancur, Rembang
- Pangkah, Tegal
- Paninggaran, Pekalongan
- Parakan, Temanggung
- Paranggupito, Wonogiri
- Pasar Kliwon, Surakarta
- Patean, Kendal
- Patebon, Kendal
- Pati, Pati
- Patikraja, Banyumas
- Patimuan, Cilacap
- Pecalungan, Batang
- Pecangaan, Jepara
- Pedan, Klaten
- Pedurungan, Semarang
- Pegandon, Kendal
- Pejagoan, Kebumen
- Pejawaran, Banjarnegara
- Pekalongan Barat, City of Pekalongan
- Pekalongan Selatan, Pekalongan
- Pekalongan Timur, Pekalongan
- Pekalongan Utara, Pekalongan
- Pekuncen, Banyumas
- Pemalang, Pemalang
- Penawangan, Grobogan
- Pengadegan, Purbalingga
- Petanahan, Kebumen
- Petarukan, Pemalang
- Petungkriono, Pekalongan
- Pituruh, Purworejo
- Plantungan, Kendal
- Plupuh, Sragen
- Polanharjo, Klaten
- Polokarto, Sukoharjo
- Poncowarno, Kebumen
- Pracimantoro, Wonogiri
- Prambanan, Klaten
- Prembun, Kebumen
- Pringapus, Semarang
- Pringsurat, Temanggung
- Pucakwangi, Pati
- Puhpelem, Wonogiri
- Pulokulon, Grobogan
- Pulosari, Pemalang
- Punggelan, Banjarnegara
- Purbalingga, Purbalingga
- Puring, Kebumen
- Purwanegara, Banjarnegara
- Purwantoro, Wonogiri
- Purwodadi, Grobogan
- Purwodadi, Purworejo
- Purwojati, Banyumas
- Purwokerto Barat, Banyumas
- Purwokerto Selatan, Banyumas
- Purwokerto Timur, Banyumas
- Purwokerto Utara, Banyumas
- Purworejo Klampok, Banjarnegara
- Purworejo, Purworejo
- Rakit, Banjarnegara
- Randublatung, Blora
- Randudongkal, Pemalang
- Rawakele, Kebumen
- Rawalo, Banyumas
- Reban, Batang
- Rembang, Purbalingga
- Rembang, Rembang
- Ringinarum, Kendal
- Rowokele, Kebumen
- Rowosari, Kendal
- Sadang, Kebumen
- Salam, Magelang
- Salaman, Magelang
- Salem, Brebes
- Sambi, Boyolali
- Sambirejo, Sragen
- Sambong, Blora
- Sambungmacan, Sragen
- Sampang, Cilacap
- Sapuran, Wonosobo
- Sarang, Rembang
- Sawangan, Magelang
- Sawit, Boyolali
- Sayung, Demak
- Secang, Magelang
- Sedan, Rembang
- Selo, Boyolali
- Selogiri, Wonogiri
- Selomerto, Wonosobo
- Selopampang, Temanggung
- Semarang Barat, Semarang
- Semarang Selatan, Semarang
- Semarang Tengah, Semarang
- Semarang Timur, Semarang
- Semarang Utara, Semarang
- Sempor, Kebumen
- Serengan, Surakarta
- Sidareja, Cilacap
- Sidoharjo, Sragen
- Sidoharjo, Wonogiri
- Sidomukti, Salatiga
- Sidorejo, Salatiga
- Sigaluh, Banjarnegara
- Simo, Boyolali
- Singorojo, Kendal
- Sirampog, Brebes
- Siwalan, Pekalongan
- Slawi, Tegal
- Slogohimo, Wonogiri
- Sluke, Rembang
- Sokaraja, Banyumas
- Somagede, Banyumas
- Songgom, Brebes
- Sragen, Sragen
- Sragi, Pekalongan
- Srumbung, Magelang
- Sruweng, Kebumen
- Subah, Batang
- Sukodono, Sragen
- Sukoharjo, Sukoharjo
- Sukoharjo, Wonosobo
- Sukolilo, Pati
- Sukorejo, Kendal
- Sulang, Rembang
- Sumbang, Banyumas
- Sumber, Rembang
- Sumberlawang, Sragen
- Sumowono, Semarang
- Sumpyuh, Banyumas
- Suradadi, Tegal
- Suruh, Semarang
- Susukan, Banjarnegara
- Susukan, Semarang
- Tahunan, Jepara
- Talang, Tegal
- Talun, Pekalongan
- Taman, Pemalang
- Tambak, Banyumas
- Tambakromo, Pati
- Tangen, Sragen
- Tanggungharjo, Grobogan
- Tanjung, Brebes
- Tanon, Sragen
- Tarub, Tegal
- Tasikmadu, Karanganyar
- Tawangharjo, Grobogan
- Tawangmangu, Karanganyar
- Tawangsari, Sukoharjo
- Tayu, Pati
- Tegal Barat, Tegal
- Tegal Selatan, Tegal
- Tegal Timur, Tegal
- Tegalrejo, Magelang
- Tegowanu, Grobogan
- Temanggung, Temanggung
- Tembalang, Semarang
- Tembarak, Temanggung
- Tempuran, Magelang
- Tengaran, Semarang
- Teras, Boyolali
- Tersono, Batang
- Tingkir, Salatiga
- Tirto, Pekalongan
- Tirtomoyo, Wonogiri
- Tlogomulyo, Temanggung
- Tlogowungu, Pati
- Todanan, Blora
- Tonjong, Brebes
- Toroh, Grobogan
- Trangkil, Pati
- Tretep, Temanggung
- Trucuk, Klaten
- Tugu, Semarang
- Tulis, Batang
- Tulung, Klaten
- Tunjungan, Blora
- Tuntang, Semarang
- Ulujami, Pemalang
- Undaan, Kudus
- Ungaran Barat, Semarang
- Ungaran Timur, Semarang
- Wadaslintang, Wonosobo
- Wanadadi, Banjarnegara
- Wanareja, Cilacap
- Wanasari, Brebes
- Wanayasa, Banjarnegara
- Wangon, Banyumas
- Warungasem, Batang
- Warungpring, Pemalang
- Warureja, Tegal
- Watukumpul, Pemalang
- Watumalang, Wonosobo
- Wedarijaksa, Pati
- Wedi, Klaten
- Wedung, Demak
- Welahan, Jepara
- Weleri, Kendal
- Weru, Sukoharjo
- Windusari, Magelang
- Winong, Pati
- Wiradesa, Pekalongan
- Wirosari, Grobogan
- Wonoboyo, Temanggung
- Wonogiri, Wonogiri
- Wonokerto, Pekalongan
- Wonopringgo, Pekalongan
- Wonosalam, Demak
- Wonosari, Klaten
- Wonosegoro, Boyolali
- Wonosobo, Wonosobo
- Wonotunggal, Batang
- Wuryantoro, Wonogiri
