= Kemiri, Indonesia =

Kemiri, Indonesia may refer to:

- Kemiri, Purworejo, a district in Purworejo Regency
- Kemiri, Tangerang, a village and administrative district in Tangerang Regency
