= Pranoto Reksosamudro =

Indonesian general (1923–1992)

Pranoto Reksosamodra
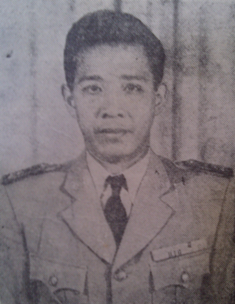
- Born: 16 April 1923; Purworejo, Dutch East Indies
- Died: 9 June 1992 (aged 69); Jakarta, Indonesia
- Burial place: Tanah Kusir public cemetery
- Military career
- Allegiance: Indonesia
- Branch: Indonesian Army
- Service years: 1945–1966
- Rank: Major General
- Commands: Chief of Staff of the Indonesian Army

Acting Minister/Commander of the Army of the Republic of Indonesia
- In office 2 October 1965 – 14 October 1965
- President: Sukarno
- Chief of Staff of the Armed Forces: A.H. Nasution
- Preceded by: Ahmad Yani
- Succeeded by: Suharto

Major General Pranoto Reksosamodra (16 April 1923 – 9 June 1992) was an Indonesian Army general who was briefly army chief of staff and was detained for 15 years without trial for alleged involvement in the 30 September Movement coup attempt.

== Early life and military career ==
Pranoto was born in Bagelen, Purworejo, Central Java, the ninth of ten children. He completed his elementary education in 1937 and studied at the Muhammadiyah Dutch middle school in Yogyakarta until 1940. He then studied to be a teacher, graduating in 1943, after which he decided to join the PETA militia, which had been established by the Japanese forces then occupying the Dutch East Indies. During his training, he met and became a close friend of fellow cadet future Indonesian president Suharto. He moved up through the ranks, and fought in the Indonesian War of Independence. He graduated from the Indonesian Army Commando Staff School in 1957, and occupied a number of posts, including commander of the Diponegoro Area Military Command from 1959–1961, replacing Suharto, who Pranoto had reported to Army headquarters for his business activities. From 1962 to 1965 he was third assistant to the Minister/Commander of the Army, Ahmad Yani. with the rank of major general.

== End of military career ==
On the night of 30 September 1965, a group calling itself the 30 September Movement attempted to arrest a number of senior army generals, including Minister/Commander of the Army Ahmad Yani, who was killed when he refused to accompany the soldiers who came to his house to detain him. The following day, while troops loyal to the movement were still in control of Central Jakarta, President Sukarno went to Halim Air force Base, which the group was using as its headquarters, although he claimed that this was so he could be near an aircraft if he needed to escape. There he was informed of the kidnappings of the generals by Brig. Gen Supardjo, one of the movement's leaders. After hearing from another general, Subur, that Yani might have been killed, and following discussions with Supardjo, at around 4pm, Sukarno decided to appoint Pranoto as caretaker army commander, possibly because of his seniority and his sympathies for Sukarno's political philosophy of Nasakom, nationalism, religion and communism. Pranoto was also acceptable to the Communist Party of Indonesia, who would later be blamed for the coup attempt. However, Maj. Gen. Suharto, commander of Kostrad, the army strategic reserve had driven to Kostrad HQ in central Jakarta and after learning of the disappearance of Yani, decided to take charge of the army. He subsequently persuaded the 30 September Movement troops occupying the square in front of Kostrad HQ to withdraw. Pranoto was also in the building, and when Sukarno's adjutant arrived to summon Pranaoto to Halim, refused to let him go and did not broadcast news of Pranoto's appointment, as ordered. Instead, Suharto announced that he had taken command of the army.

Following the failure of the 30 September Movement, on 2 October, Sukarno, Suharto, Pranoto and Gen. Mursjid had a meeting at the Bogor Palace. This ended with a compromise. As Pranoto's appointment was unacceptable to Suharto and Armed Forces Chief of Staff, General Abdul Haris Nasution, Sukarno would formally command the army, Pranoto would carry out the "daily tasks" of the commander and Suharto would be responsible for the "restoration of security and order". However, Suharto behaved as de facto army commander, and under pressure from him and Nasution, on 16 October Sukarno conceded and formally appointed Suharto as minister/commander of the army.

== Imprisonment and death ==
Pranoto was accused of involvement in the 30 September Movement, and on 16 February 1966, he was detained on the orders of Suharto, who had never forgiven him for the "betrayal" of the report to Army HQ. He was never tried, and remained in custody for 15 years, finally being released on 16 February 1981. He died on 9 June 1992 and was buried in the Tanah Kusir public cemetery, South Jakarta.
