= Karanganyar (town) =

- Town
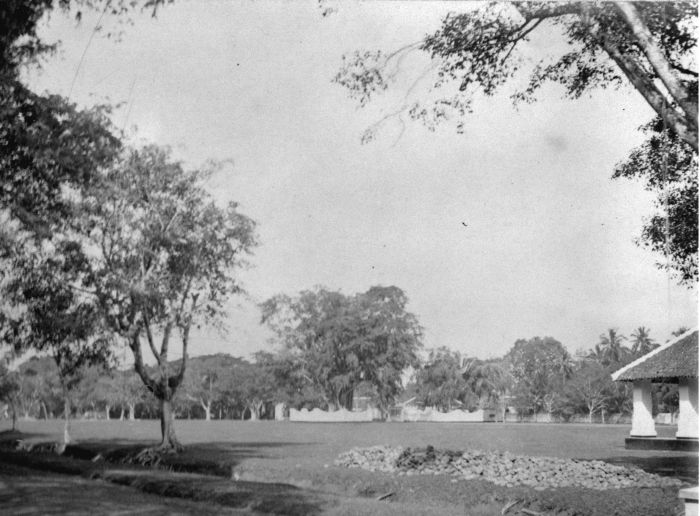
- Alun-alun Karanganyar, photo was taken on 3 August 1904 (122 years ago)

- Location within Karanganyar Regency Location within Java Location within Indonesia
- Coordinates: 7.60328°S 110.97777°E
- Country: Indonesia
- Province: Central Java
- Regency: Karanganyar Regency

Area
  - Total: 43.03 km^{2} (16.61 sq mi)

Population (mid 2022 estimate)
  - Total: 86,402
  - Density: 2,008/km^{2} (5,201/sq mi)
- Time zone: UTC+7 (IWST)
- Area code: (+62) 271
- Villages: 12
- Website: karanganyar.karanganyarkab.go.id

Karanganyar is a town and the capital of Karanganyar Regency. The town is located in the Central Java, Indonesia.

== Administrative villages ==
Karanganyar consists of 12 urban villages (kelurahan) namely:

1. Bejen
2. Bolong
3. Cangakan
4. Delingang
5. Gayamdompo
6. Gedong
7. Jantiharjo
8. Jungke
9. Karanganyar
10. Lalung
11. Popongan
12. Tegalgede
