= Karanganyar, Kebumen =

Karanganyar
- Town
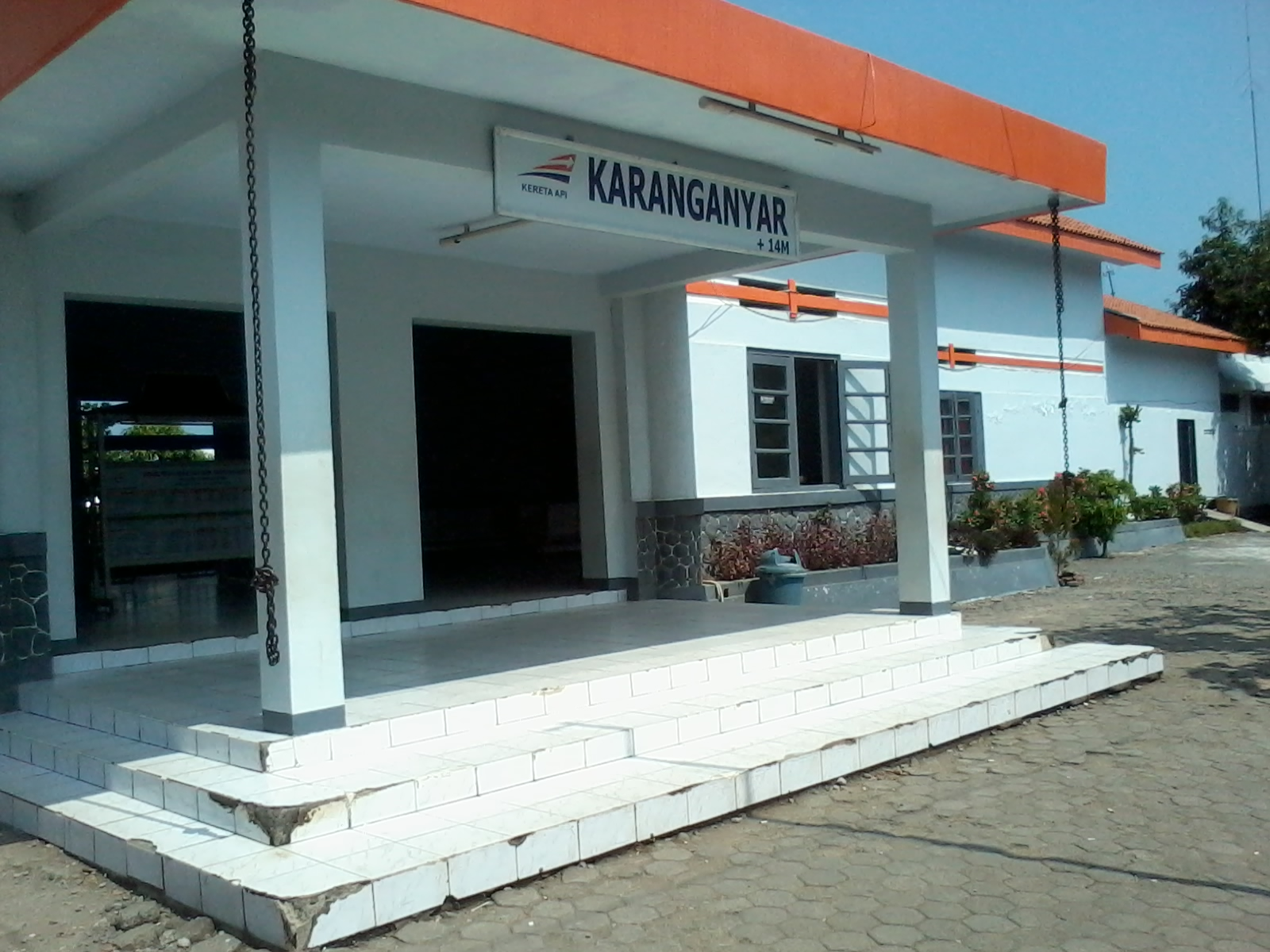
- Karanganyar Train Station
- Motto: Indonesian: Beriman
- Location within Kebumen Regency Location within Java Location within Indonesia
- Coordinates: 7°37′48″S 109°34′29″E
- Country: Indonesia
- Province: Central Java
- Regency: Kebumen Regency

Area
  - Total: 31.40 km^{2} (12.12 sq mi)

Population (mid 2024 estimate)
  - Total: 38,325
  - Density: 1,221/km^{2} (3,161/sq mi)
- Time zone: UTC+7 (IWST)
- Area code: (+62) 287
- Villages: 11
- Website: kec-karanganyar.kebumenkab.go.id

Karanganyar is an administrative district (kecamatan) and town in Kebumen Regency, Central Java, Indonesia. According to the Indonesian Agency for Meteorology, Climatology and Geophysics, this area has high rainfall. Its climate is renowned for its coolness.

== Administrative villages ==
Karanganyar consists of 11 villages (four rated as urban kelurahan - Karanganyar, Jatiluhur, Panjatan and Plarangan - and seven as rural desa) namely:

1. Candi
2. Giripurno
3. Grenggeng
4. Jatiluhur
5. Karanganyar
6. Karangkemiri
7. Panjatan
8. Plarangan
9. Pohkumbang
10. Sidomulyo
11. Wonorejo
