= Pedan (subdistrict) =

Coordinates: 7.691698199999999°S 110.70628669999999°E

Pedan is an administrative district (kecamatan) in Klaten Regency, Central Java, Indonesia.
