= Grogol, Sukoharjo =

District in Sukoharjo Regency, Central Java Province, Indonesia

Coordinates: 7.6146042°S 110.8135688°E

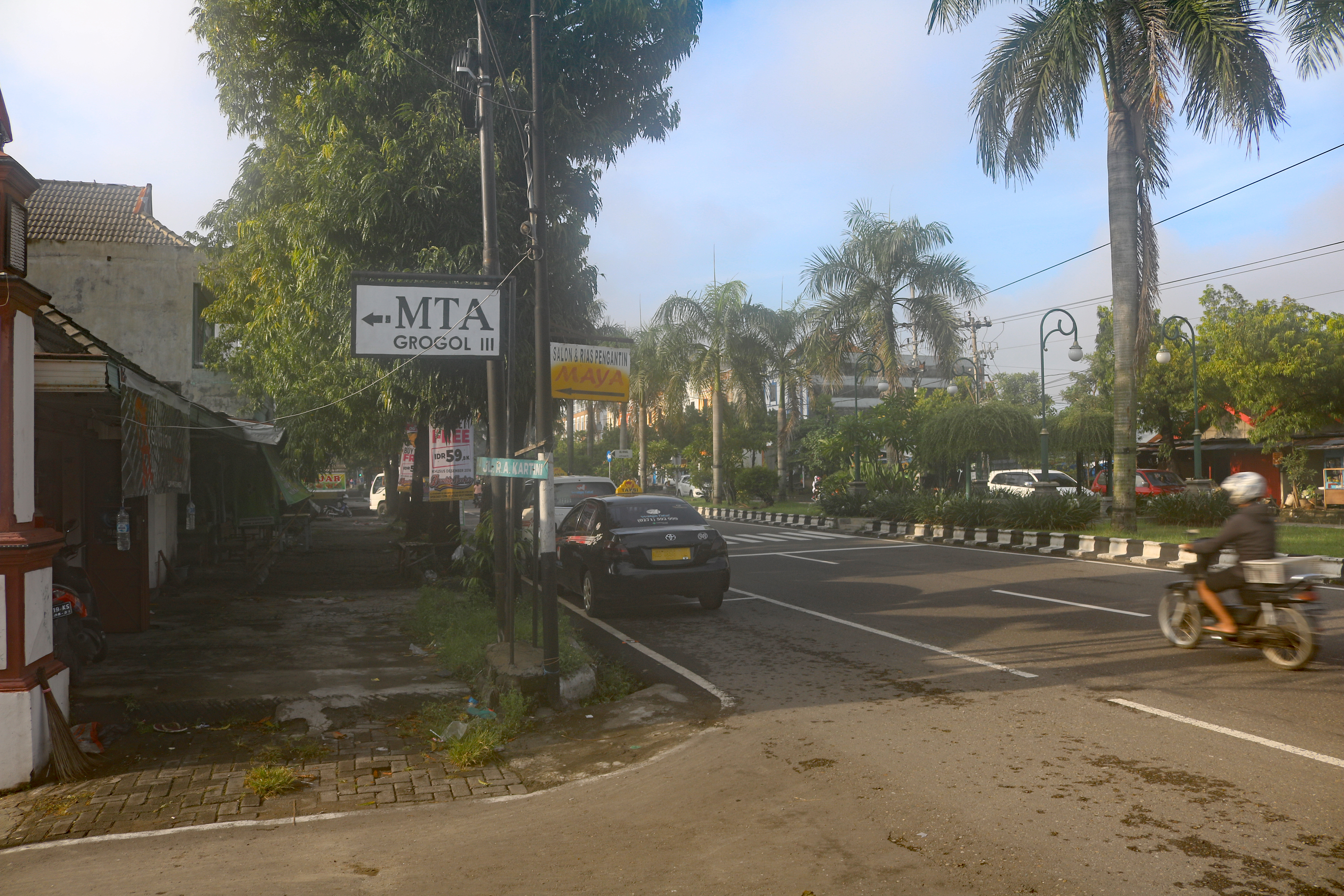
A street scene in Grogol.

Grogol is a subdistrict (kecamatan) in Sukoharjo Regency, Central Java, Indonesia. The housing estate, Solo Baru ("New Solo") is located here and this subdistrict is a satellite city of Surakarta.

The Al-Mukmin Islamic school is located here, in Ngruki, a village in this subdistrict. This pesantren is chaired by Abu Bakar Ba'asyir alleged to have been involved in the 2002 Bali bombing.
