= Purworejo Regency =

Regency in Central Java, Indonesia

Coordinates: 7°43′S 110°1′E

Purworejo Regency Kabupaten Purworejo
- Regency
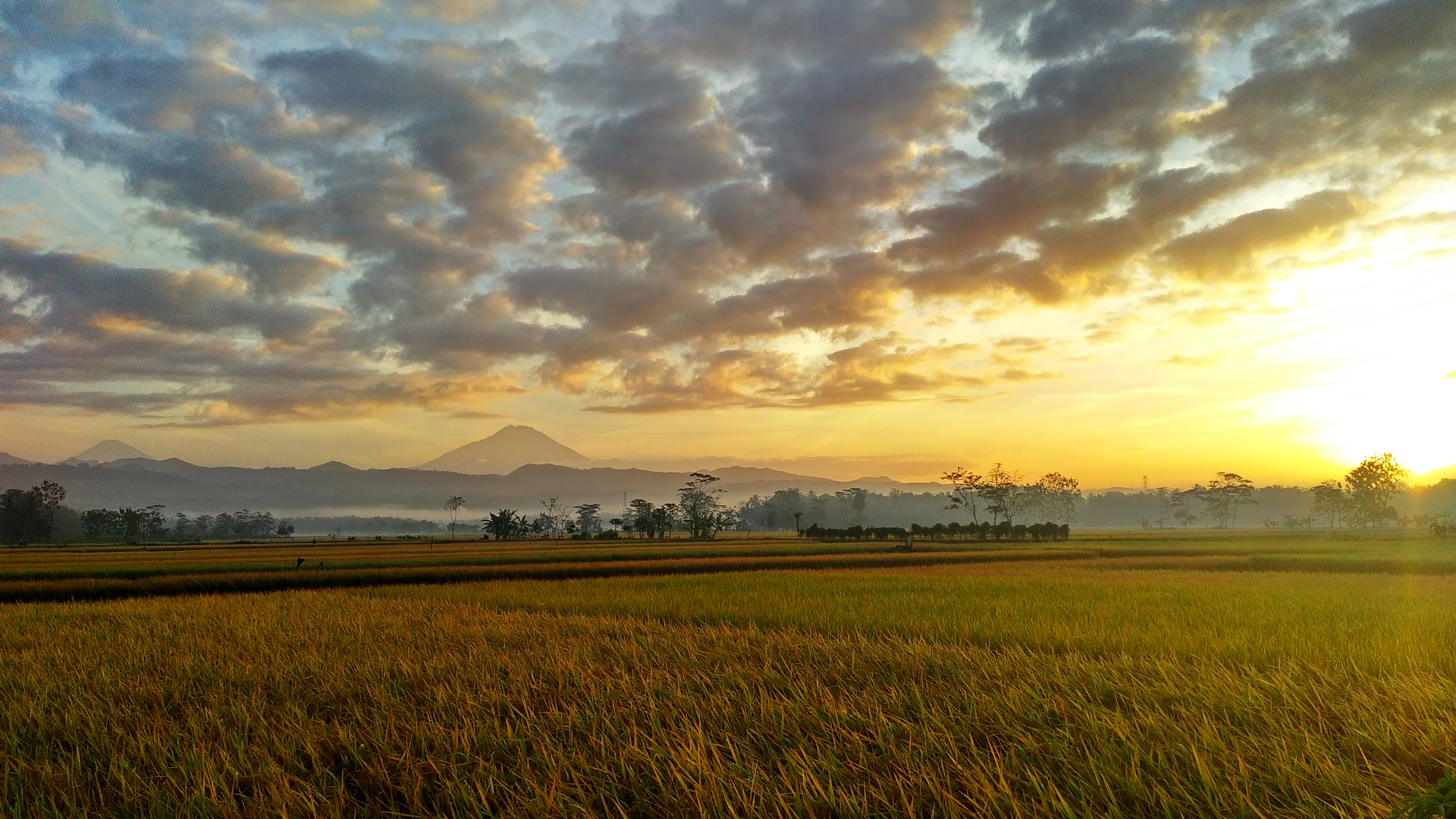
- Rice fields at the village of Ngampel

- Coat of arms
- Motto: Purworejo Berirama (Bersih, Indah, Rapi, Aman, dan Makmur) (Clean, Lovely, Tidy, Safe, and Palmy)
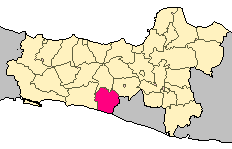
- Country: Indonesia
- Province: Central Java
- Seat: Purworejo

Government
  - Regent: Yuli Hastuti
  - Vice Regent: Dion Agasi Setiabudi

Area
  - Total: 1,081.45 km^{2} (417.55 sq mi)

Population (mid 2025 estimate)
  - Total: 801,670
  - Density: 741.29/km^{2} (1,919.9/sq mi)
- Time zone: UTC+7
- Website: purworejokab.go.id

Purworejo is a regency (Indonesian: kabupaten; Javanese: ꦥꦸꦂꦮꦉꦗ, romanized: Purwareja) in the southern part of Central Java province in Indonesia. It covers an area of 1,081.45 km^{2} and had a population of 695,427 at the 2010 Census and 769,880 at the 2020 Census; the official estimate as of mid 2025 was 801,670 (comprising 401,499 males and 400,171 females). Its capital is the town of Purworejo.

== History ==
=== Ancient Mataram Hindu Period (8th–9th century AD) ===
The history of Purworejo is first recorded on Kayu Ara Hiwang inscription on 5 October 901, which is being found in Boro Wetan Village. The area was originally known by the name 'Bagelen' (read /ba·gə·lɛn/) and it is now become a smaller part of the whole Purworejo regency.

In the 9th centuries, Bagelen is part of the history of the ancient Mataram Hindu civilization (See: Mataram kingdom) which was flourished on Kedu Plain. It is estimated that within the period of Rakai Watukara Dyah Balitung, Bagelen had become the capital of the Mataram Hindu Kingdom or that it is the origin of the king as Watukara is a river name in Bagelen.

The ancient artifact being found in Bagelen is Kayu Ara Hiwang inscription which explain Shima ceremony. At that period, when a new land is being opened for economic or religious use, there will be a ceremony being held by the authorities, namely Shima ceremony. The authorities mentioned in the inscription are: Sang Ratu Bajra, who is allegedly as Rakryan Mahamantri/Mapatih Hino Sri Daksottama Bahubajrapratipaksaya, who is also the brother-in-law of Rakai Watukura Dyah Balitung and who also later became Balitung's successor.

The ceremony mentions that the land is being freed from any tax duty, but it has the obligation to maintain the holiness of a sacred place called "parahiyangan" (which means the place of Gods). The ceremony also purified the area of Kayu Ara Hiwang of any evil's influence. Kayu Ara Hiwang area itself consists of rice fields, savanna, caves and arable land. The cave mentioned in the inscription is identified as Seplawan Cave, where a shiva gold statue is being found and therefore the second artifact within Bagelen area.

Within this period, Bagelen became a religious center where some Buddhist monks (and often skilled with martial arts) were probably lived along the Bogowonto river banks.

=== Mataram Sultanate (Muslim) Period (15th–16th century AD) ===
During this period, the people of Bagelen is famous for becoming the special arms force for Sutawijaya, hence the beginning of its militaristic character which also said as inheritance of the martial art skills being instilled by the previous Buddhist monks from the ancient Mataram period.

=== Dutch Colonial Period (16th–19th century AD) ===
During this period, Bagelen area was notorious of its powerful insurgent which support Prince Diponegoro throughout Java War. Upon the defeat of Diponegoro, Bagelen was being asked from Mataram Sultanate in order to undermine the power of Bagelen's insurgent and was being integrated into Kedu Residency by the Dutch Colonial ruler. The new town, called Poerworedjo (new spelling: Purworejo) is being designed by a Dutch architect by adopting traditional Javanese architecture and tradition. The Dutch implemented indirect rule, which is reflected in its town architecture, where the regent is from the local leader (Raden Adipati Cokronegoro Pertama) and the co-ruler (the regent assistant) is always a Dutch. This new town was also served as Dutch military base camp that housed the Dutch Black Colonial Armed Forces from West Africa. Being a Dutch military base, several Dutch residents were born, lived and died in Purworejo, leaving genealogical records and memoirs in the regency.

Some Dutch colonial buildings are still in a good shape until now as of Regency Official House (1840), a church which still become GPIB Church (1879), Kweekschool (1915), Train Station, Bank, Hospital. During this period, there were 2 main religious figures: a Muslim preacher (mubaligh) kyai Imam Pura and a Javanese Christian Evangelist, Kyai Sadrach. This is the evidence that in Purworejo, Muslim and Christians are being accepted harmoniously by its people.

== Modern Indonesian period ==
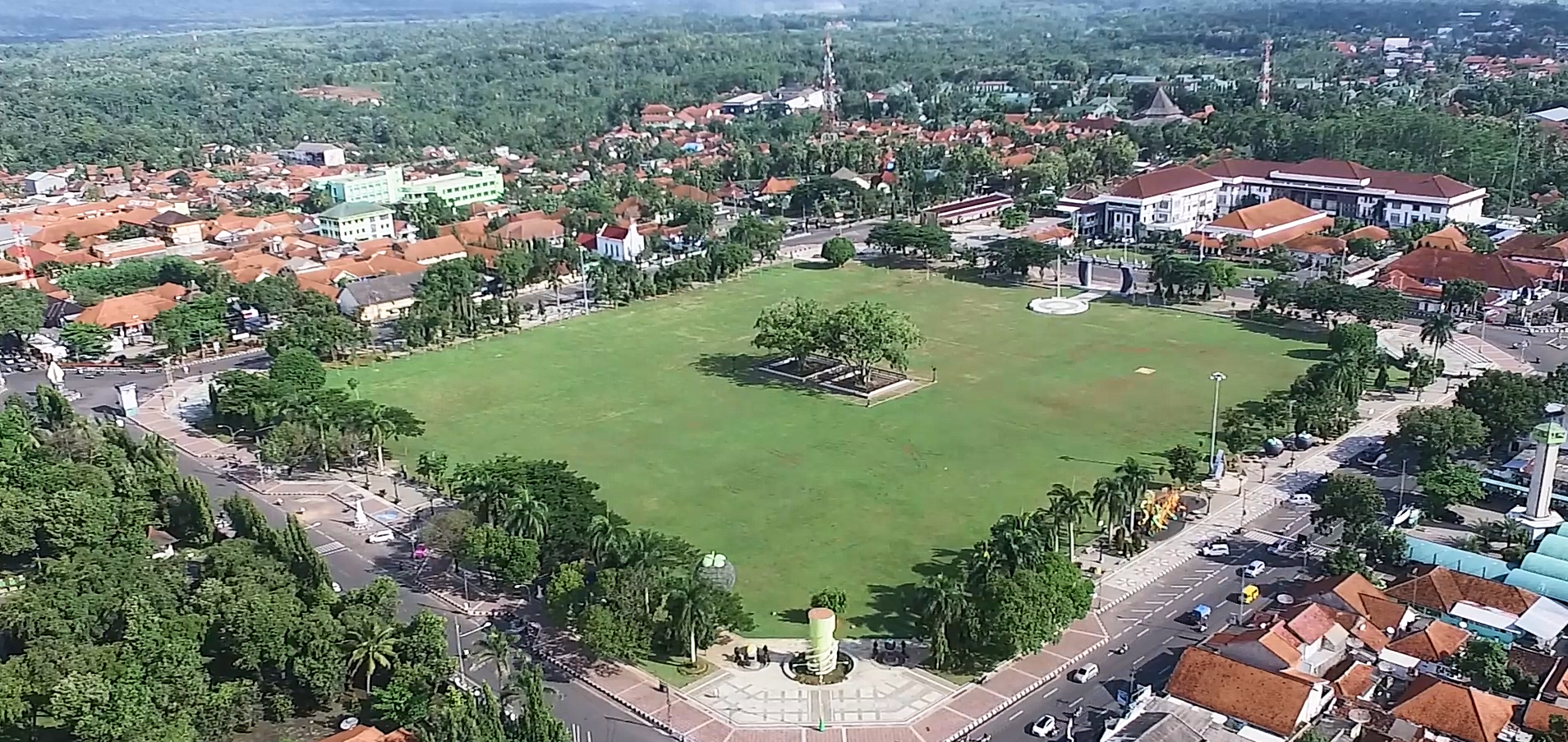
Aerial view of Alun-alun of Purworejo

In the modern day Indonesia, Purworejo produce skilled work force in the area of government, education and military. The prominent general from Purworejo is Sarwo Edhie Wibowo who is also the father-in-law of President Susilo Bambang Yudhoyono. There are also several other notable general arms forces, government officials, ministers and lecturers as being listed in the notables from Purworejo.

Purworejo is recently more well known as the town of retirement. As the economic and government activities of modern Indonesia is centered in Jakarta, the majority of Purworejo citizens are urged to work in Jakarta or in other parts of Indonesia or even worldwide. However, there is also an urge for Purworejo citizen to repatriate and to build retirement residences in Purworejo. Because of its reputation as a retirement town in the modern day, its inheritance as a Dutch town and its ancient inheritance of Buddhist religious center, Purworejo is relatively a peaceful town with vast main roads, big old trees on both sides, regular squares of town blocks and its preserved Dutch buildings. The wider area of Purworejo Regency mainly has agriculture and livestock activities while some medium-sized, export oriented industrial activities (traditional furniture, textile and sports equipment) is being established in the southern part of the region.

== Administrative districts ==
Purworejo Regency is divided into the following sixteen districts (kecamatan), tabulated below with their areas and their populations at the 2010 Census and the 2020 Census, together with the official estimate as of mid 2025. The table also includes the locations of the district administrative centres, the number of administrative villages in each district (totaling 469 rural desa and 25 urban kelurahan), and its post code.

| Kode Wilayah | Name of District (kecamatan) | Area in km^{2} | Pop'n 2010 Census | Pop'n 2020 Census | Pop'n mid 2025 Estimate | Admin centre | No. of Villages | Post code |
|---|---|---|---|---|---|---|---|---|
| 33.06.01 | Grabag | 67.80 | 42,634 | 48,903 | 51,772 | Paturejo | 32 | 54265 |
| 33.06.02 | Ngombol | 59.33 | 30,779 | 34,791 | 36,572 | Ngombol | 57 | 54172 |
| 33.06.03 | Purwodadi | 56.15 | 36,435 | 41,095 | 43,153 | Jenar Wetan | 40 | 54173 |
| 33.06.04 | Bagelen | 63.44 | 28,708 | 30,486 | 31,093 | Bagelan | 17 | 54174 |
| 33.06.05 | Kaligesing | 78.33 | 29,107 | 31,735 | 32,782 | Kaligono | 21 | 54175 |
| 33.06.06 | Purworejo (district) | 53.25 | 82,904 | 85,308 | 85,688 | Cangkreplor | 25 ^{(a)} | 54112: 54119 ^{(b)} |
| 33.06.07 | Banyuurip | 47.78 | 39,983 | 43,234 | 44,482 | Banyuurip | 27 ^{(c)} | 54171 |
| 33.06.08 | Bayan | 44.66 | 45,636 | 51,268 | 53,732 | Besole | 26 ^{(d)} | 54222: 54224 |
| 33.06.09 | Kutoarjo | 39.20 | 58,176 | 62,079 | 63,463 | Kutoarjo | 27 ^{(e)} | 54211: 54214 ^{(f)} |
| 33.06.10 | Butuh | 47.21 | 38,787 | 42,011 | 43,259 | Diangu | 41 | 54264 ^{(g)} |
| 33.06.11 | Pituruh | 89.01 | 45,667 | 51,191 | 53,594 | Pituruh | 49 | 54263 |
| 33.06.12 | Kemiri | 103.15 | 50,611 | 58,230 | 61,737 | Kemiri Kidul | 40 | 54262 |
| 33.06.13 | Bruno | 105.68 | 43,274 | 52,033 | 56,357 | Brunorejo | 18 | 54261 |
| 33.06.14 | Gebang | 70.51 | 39,829 | 43,401 | 44,821 | Bendosari | 25 ^{(h)} | 54191 ^{(i)} |
| 33.06.15 | Loano | 53.51 | 34,545 | 38,052 | 39,503 | Banyuasin Kembaran | 21 | 54181 |
| 33.06.16 | Bener | 102.44 | 48,352 | 56,063 | 59,662 | Kaliurip | 28 | 54183 |
| | Totals | 1,081.45 | 695,427 | 769,880 | 801,670 | Purworejo | 494 | |

Notes: (a) comprising 14 urban kelurahan (Baledono, Cangkrep Kidul, Cangkrep Lor, Doplang, Kedung Sari, Keseneng, Mranti, Mudal, Paduroso, Pangenjuru Tengah, Pangenrejo, Purworejo, Sindurjan and Tambakrejo) and 11 desa.
(b) except the kelurahan of Purworejo, which has a post code of 54151. (c) including 3 kelurahan (Boro Kulon, Kledung Karangdalem and Kledung Kradenan).
(d) including one kelurahan (Sucenjuru Tengah). (e) comprising 6 kelurahan (Bandung, Bayem, Katerban, Kutoarjo, Semawung Daleman and Semawung Kembaran) and 21 desa.
(f) except the kelurahan of Kutoarjo, which has a post code of 54251. (g) except the desa of Kedungsari, which has a post code of 54116.
(h) including one kelurahan (Lugosobo). (i) except the desa of Kemiri, which has a post code of 54262.

== Transportation ==
=== Aviation ===
Air transportation coming to/from Purworejo is served by Yogyakarta International Airport (IATA: YIA, ICAO: WAHI) in Kulon Progo near the border of Yogyakarta Special Region and Purworejo Regency, within approximately 30 minutes driving distance. Interestingly, the driving distance to YIA from Purworejo is closer than from the City of Yogyakarta. Before the development of YIA, the principal airport serving the area was Adisucipto International Airport (IATA: JOG, ICAO: WAHH), an air force base at the eastern part of Yogyakarta. It is located within 2.5 hours driving distance from Purworejo, making it much farther than the new airport.

=== Rail-based ===
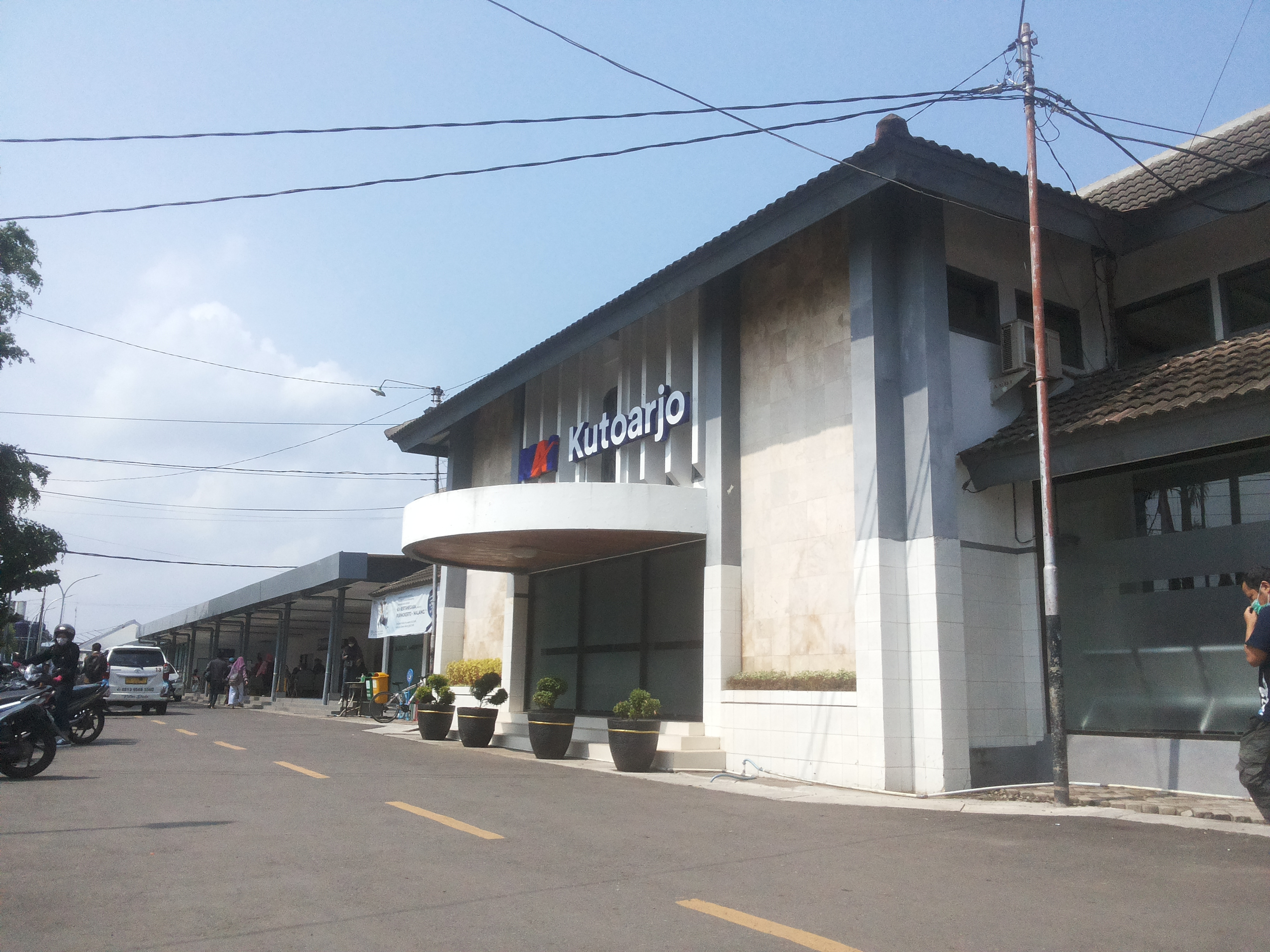
Kutoarjo Railway station

Railway in Purworejo is part of the southern Java railway system. Five train stations have served various areas in Purworejo. The primary station is Kutoarjo in Kutoarjo District. Located at an altitude of +16 meters, Kutoarjo Station is a large type A railway station that has seven (7) fully functioning lines (4 public and 3 maintenance lines). It is the easternmost active train station operated by Kereta Api Indonesia (KAI) Operation Area V Purwokerto, and the westernmost station served by KAI Commuter Region VI Yogyakarta. Other train stations in Purworejo Regency are Wojo (Class III/Small) in Bagelen District, Jenar (Class III/Small) in Purwodadi District, Montelan (Class III/Small) in Banyuurip District, and Purworejo (Class II/Medium) in Purworejo District. All are in operation except for Montelan Station (inactive since 2007) and Purworejo Station (since 2010). Some popular routes going through stations in Purworejo include:

==== Intercity ====
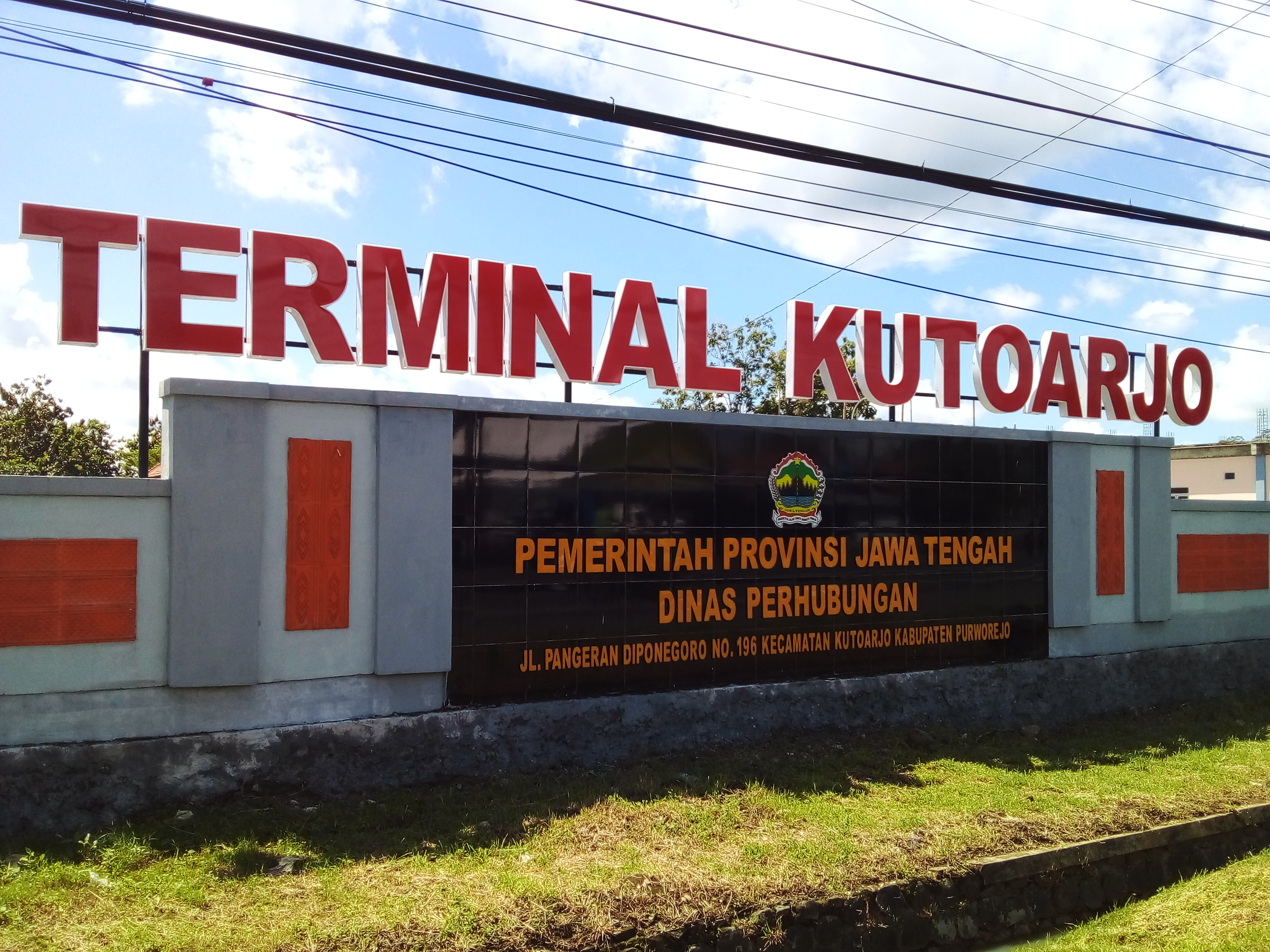
Kutoarjo Intercity bus station

- Taksaka (executive class): Yogyakarta – Kutoarjo – Jakarta
- Argo Lawu (executive class): Jakarta – Kutoarjo – Solo
- Argo Dwipangga (executive class): Jakarta – Kutoarjo – Solo
- Argo Wilis (executive class): Bandung – Kutoarjo – Surabaya
- Turangga (executive class): Bandung – Kutoarjo – Surabaya
- Sawunggalih Utama (executive and business classes): Kutoarjo – Jakarta
- Lodaya route (executive and business classes): Solo – Kutoarjo – Bandung
- Kutojaya Utara (economy class): Kutoarjo – Jakarta
- Bogowonto (economy AC class): Yogyakarta – Kutoarjo – Jakarta
- Kutojaya Selatan (economy class): Kutoarjo – Bandung
- Gaya Baru Malam Selatan (economy class): Jakarta – Kutoarjo – Surabaya
- Sancaka Utara (executive and business classes): Kutoarjo – Surabaya

==== Commuter ====
Prambanan Express Commuter Line, commonly abbreviated as Pramex (in English) or Prameks (in Indonesian), is a commuter rail service that connects Yogyakarta and Purworejo. The service, which first operated in 1994, operates using diesel multiple unit trains and covers a distance of about 64 kilometers (40 mi). It was previously serving Purworejo–Surakarta (Solo) via Yogyakarta for 26 years before the Surakarta–Yogyakarta railway line was electrified in 2021. Currently, the train serves five (5) active stations across the line, including two (2) in Yogyakarta (Tugu and Wates) and three (3) in Purworejo (Wojo, Jenar, and Kutoarjo). Formerly under the management of KAI, Pramex was transferred to KAI Commuter after obtaining the operation permit from the Ministry of Transportation in 2020.

=== Road-based ===
Road transportation in Purworejo is served by several bus operators. Trans Jateng is a bus rapid transit (BRT) service that has been connecting Purworejo and Borobudur (Magelang Regency) since 2020. It operates from Kutoarjo Station and goes through Corridor 4 (P1), serving Purworejo within the larger Purwomanggung agglomeration. Private companies also operate intercity bus routes in Purworejo, with some of the major ones include

- Sumber Alam: Purworejo – Jakarta
- Efisiensi: Purwokerto – Yogyakarta via Purworejo
- Budiman: Bandung – Magelang via Purworejo, Tasikmalaya – Semarang via Purworejo
- Bandung Express: Bandung – Yogyakarta/Wonogiri/Klaten via Purworejo
- Rosalia Indah: Jakarta – Surabaya via Purworejo, Muara Enim – Malang/Surabaya via Purworejo
- Pahala Kencana: Jakarta – Yogyakarta/Wonogiri via Purworejo
- Sinar Jaya: Merak/Jakarta – Yogyakarta via Purworejo, Metro Lampung – Klaten/Solo via Purworejo

== Tourism ==
Purworejo has not been fully marketed as a tourism area, although it has natural attractions including its south-western range of Menoreh hills with its caves (Seplawan cave), its southern beaches (Ketawang, Congot, Jatimalang) along the coastal districts of Grabag, Ngombol and Purwogadi, and its northern picturesque scenery of two active volcanoes - Mount Sumbing and Mount Sundoro - and its mountainous range with its waterfalls to the northern-east (Bruno).

== Sports & Amusement Park ==
=== Swimming pools & Waterpark ===
- Artha Tirta (Baledono, Purworejo)
- DeWa Swimming Pool & Angkringan (Cangkreplor, Purworejo)
- Alam Tirta (Pangenrejo, Purworejo), also known as Kedung Kebo
- Dungrong Children's Swimming Pool & Catfish Fishing Pond (Pangenrejo, Purworejo)
- Tirta Lestari (Argo Peni, Kutoarjo)
- Cyblon Swimming Pool (Suren, Kutoarjo)
- RSN Swimming Pool (Dukuhdungus, Grabag)
- Terbis Swimming Pool (Krandegan, Bayan)
- Pesona Trukan Tambahrejo (Krendetan, Bagelen)
- DEMAJI Eco Park Purworejo (Kaligono, Kaligesing)
- The Nice Playland Purworejo (Andong, Butuh), replacing Sumber Adventure Center (SAC) Waterpark

=== Car Free Day ===
Every Sunday morning from 6 am to 10 am the roads surrounding 1 km-square town square (alun-alun) are closed to automobile traffic and opened to walking and other uses.

=== Town Sports Center ===
GOR WR Supratman

=== Futsal (Mini football) centers ===
There are five futsal halls around the town.

=== Cycling ===
Purworejo landscape is ideal for cycling as the terrain varies with easy no elevation long routes along rice fields, to moderate challenge with some elevation around foothills, and the more difficult uphill routes to Menoreh hills at 300–800 meters above the sea level.

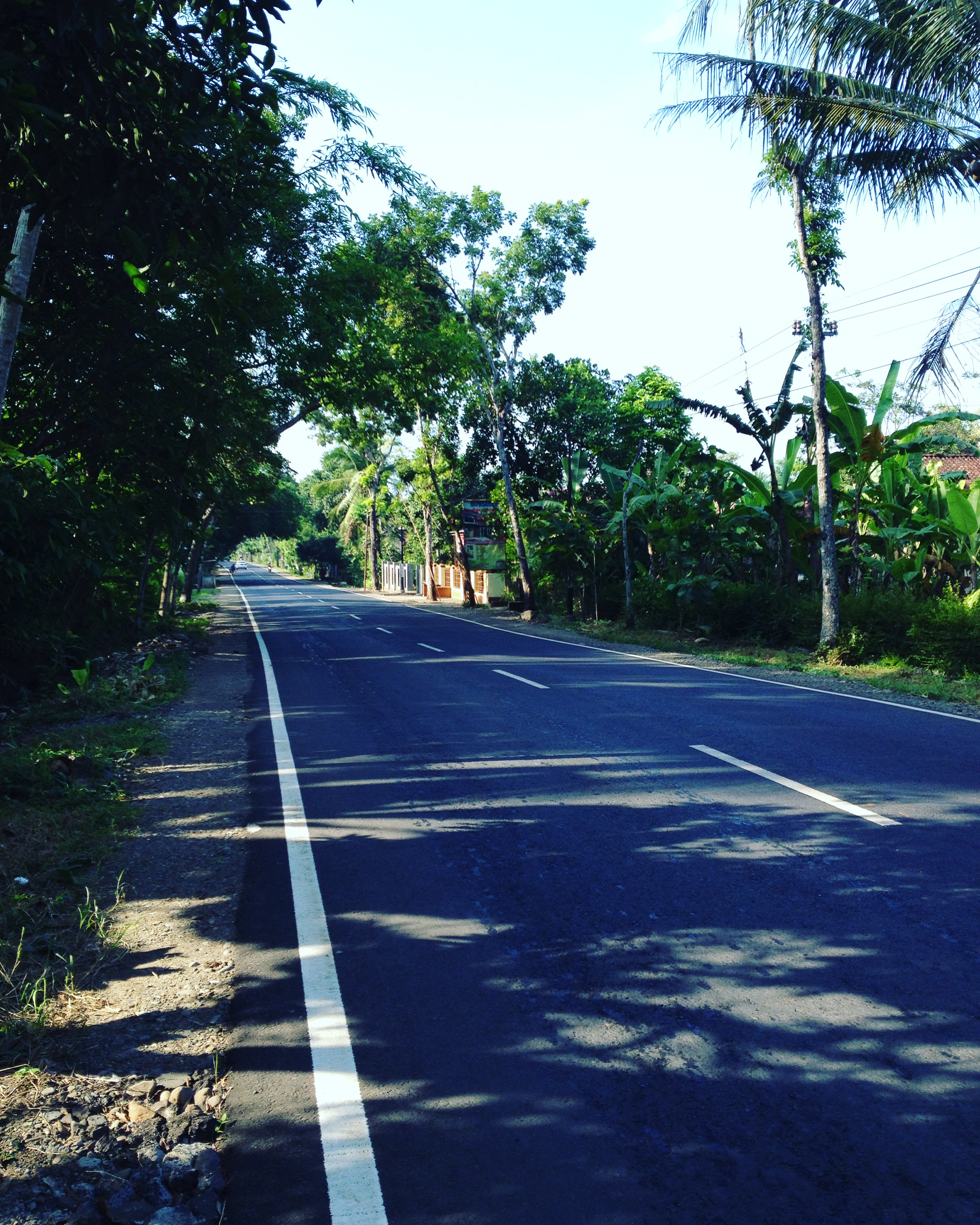
Cycling Route at Outer Ring Road (Jl Pahlawan) asphalt surface

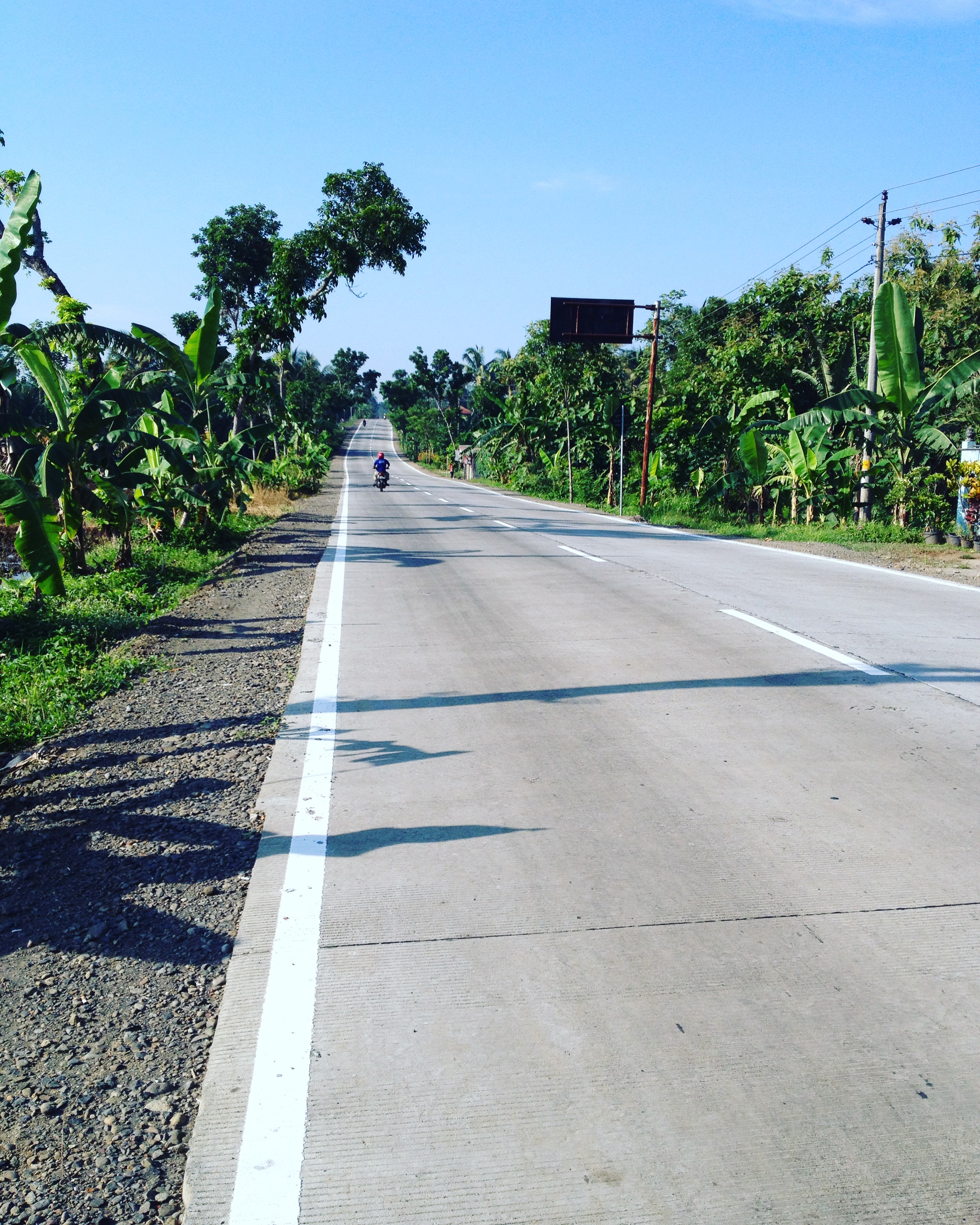
Cycling Route at Outer Ring Road (Jl Pahlawan) concrete surface with moderate elevation

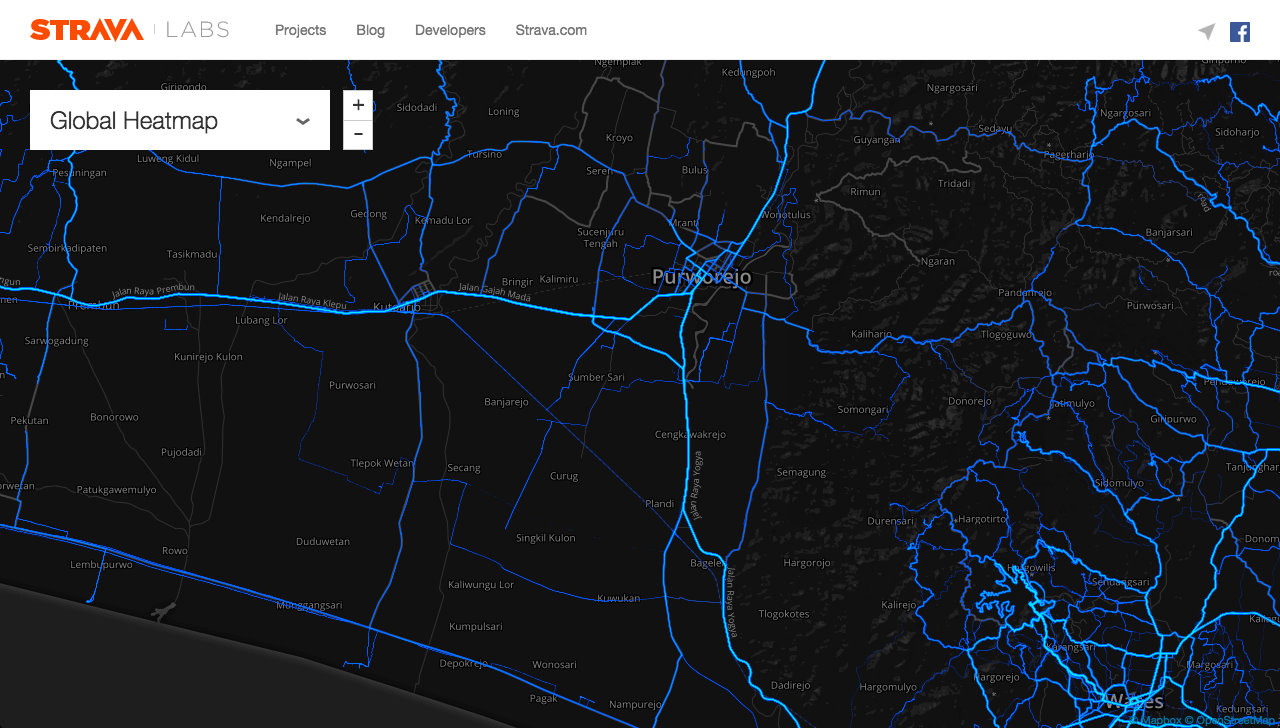
Kutoarjo-Purworejo (Central Java) – Wates (Yogyakarta) cycling heatmap via Strava

== Gallery of Dutch Colonial's Poerworedjo ==
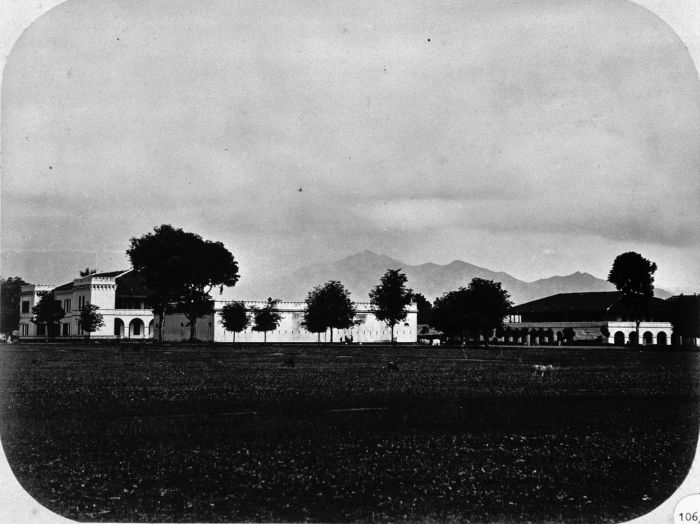
Military barracks (1870)

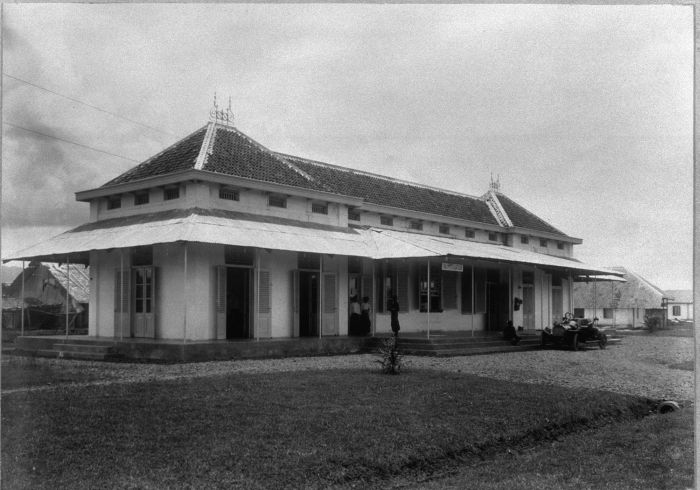
A sugar factory (1910), no longer standing

== Gallery of today's Purworejo ==
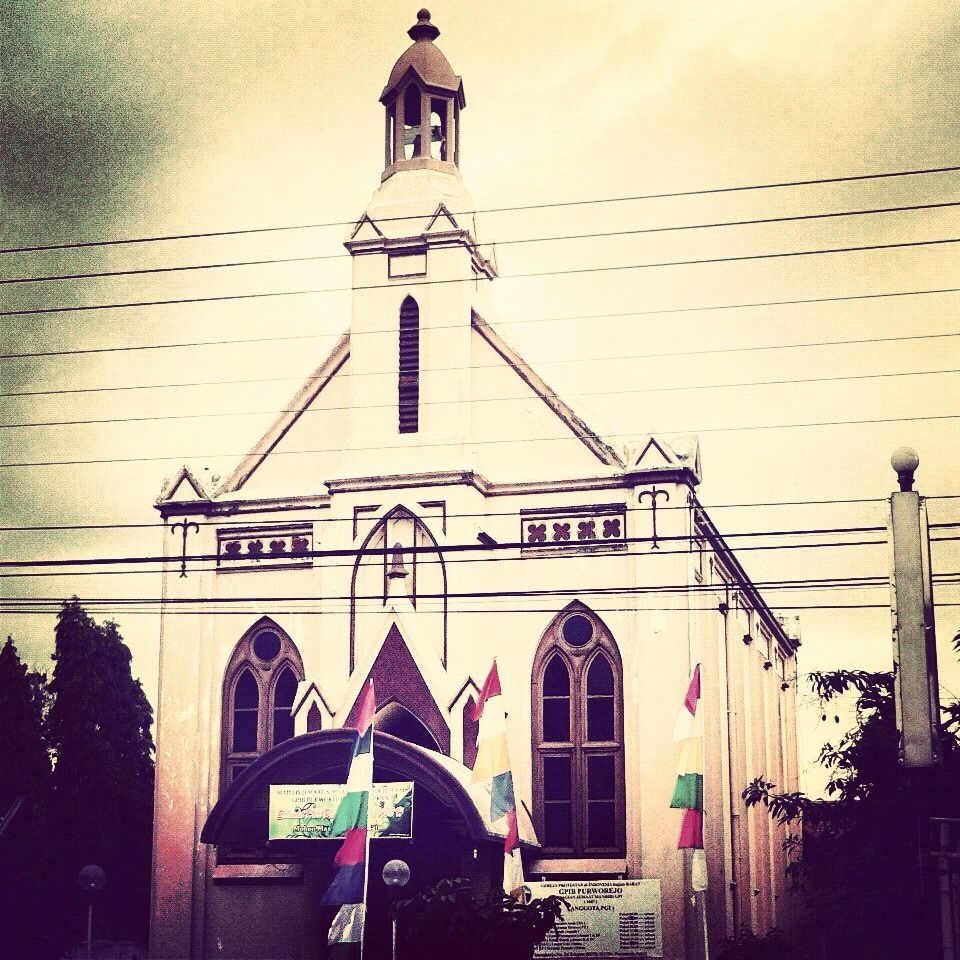
GIPB Church (2011)

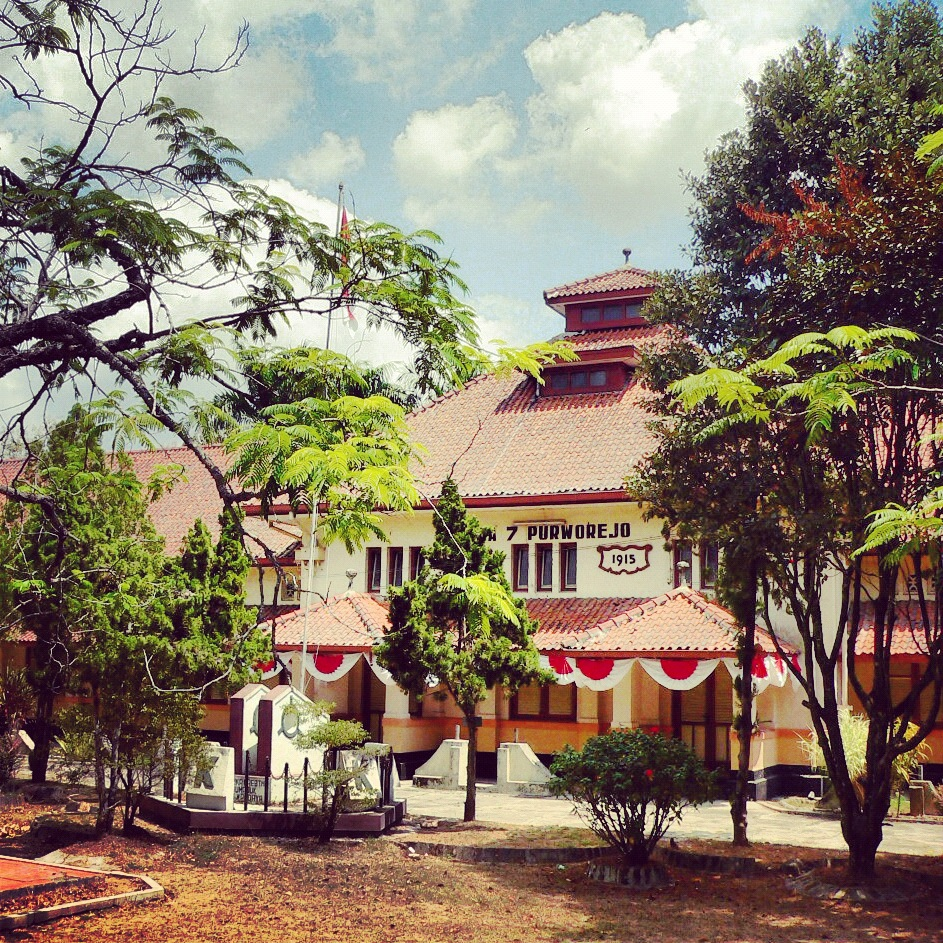
SMUN 7 Highschool (2011)

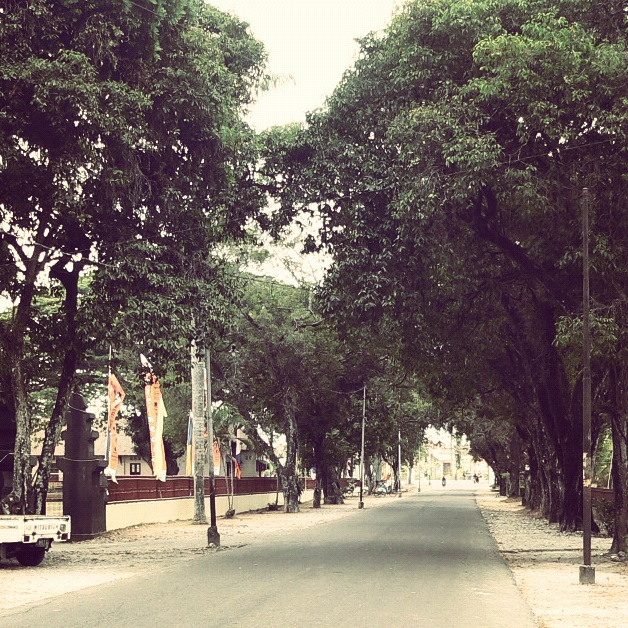
Large street since Colonial period (2011)

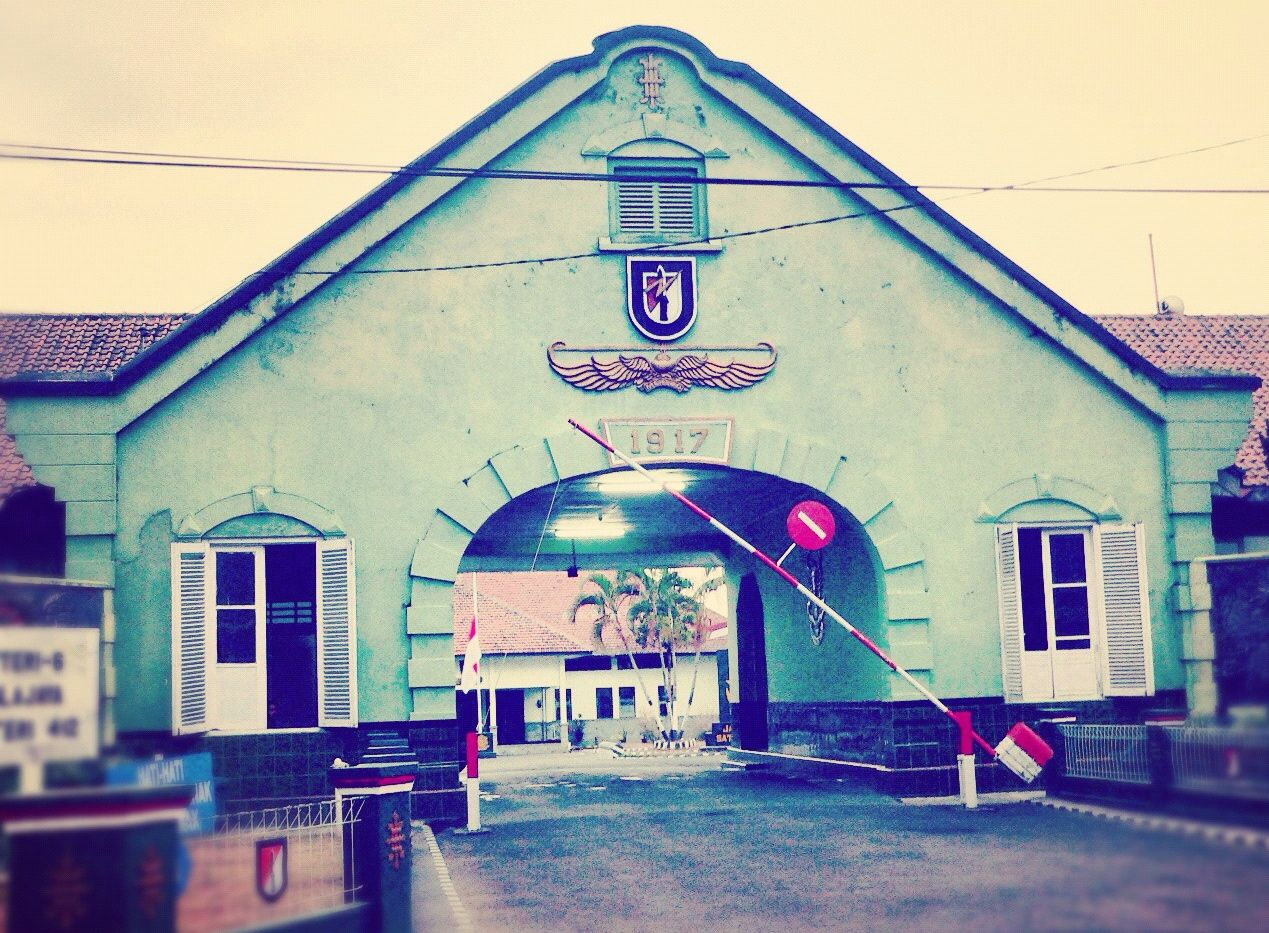
Military Barrack (2011)

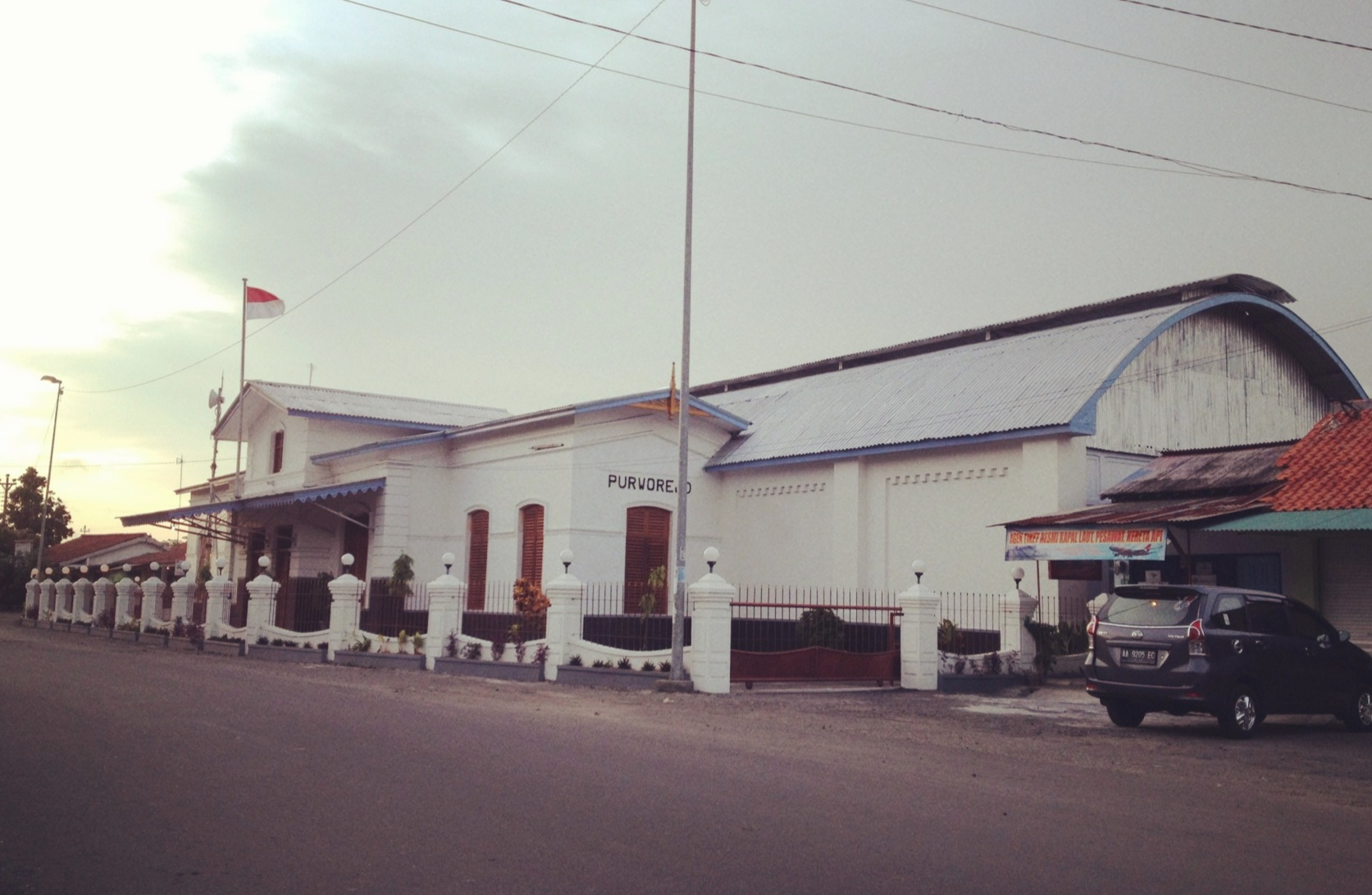
Train Station (2012)

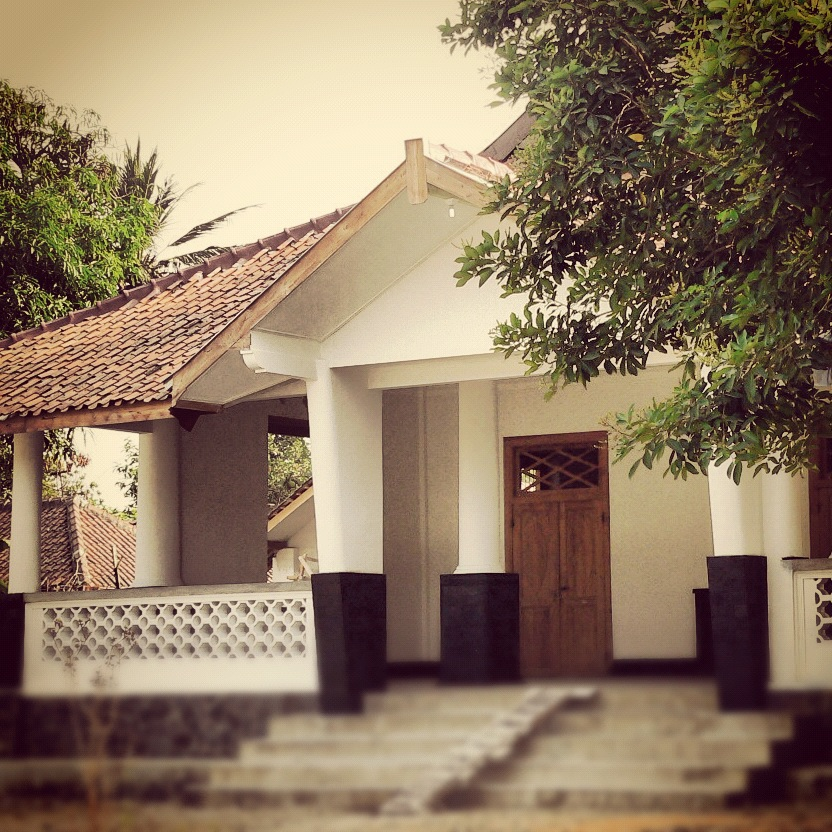
An Indische Huis (2011)

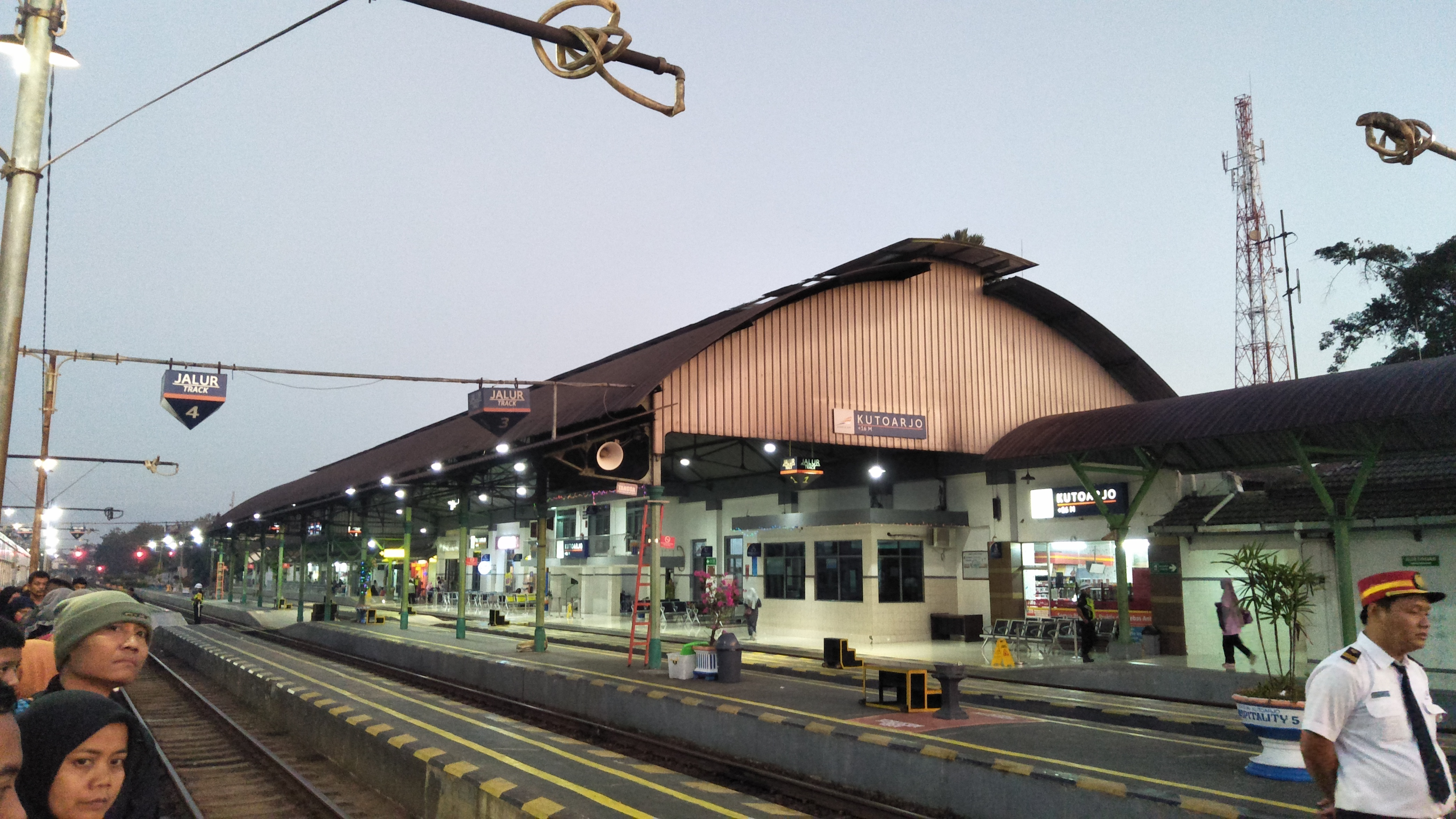
Interior view of Kutoarjo railway station (2018)

== Notable people ==
=== Figures of Indonesian Independence ===
- Mr. Wilopo; 7th Prime Minister of Indonesia (1952–1953)
- Mr. Ali Sastroamidjojo; 8th and 10th Prime Minister of Indonesia (1953–1955; 1956–1957); Chairman of the Indonesian National Party (PNI, 1960–1966)
- Gen.(Anu.) Benedictus Oerip Soemohardjo; founder and first Commander of the Indonesian National Armed Forces (Panglima TNI, 1945); National Hero of Indonesia
- Boentaran Martoatmodjo, M.D.; 1st Minister of Health (1945); co-founder of Indonesian Red Cross Society (PMI, 1945)
- Mr. Kasman Singodimedjo; Attorney General (1945–1946); Junior Minister of Justice in the Second Amir Sjarifuddin Cabinet (1947–1948); National Hero of Indonesia
- Wage Rudolf Soepratman (in debate); the writer of Indonesian national anthem "Indonesia Raya"
- Winoto Danoe Asmoro; Presidential House Chief-of-Staff for Ir. Sukarno (1st President of Indonesia)

=== Military Figures ===
- Gen.(Anu.) Ahmad Yani; Chief-of-Staff of the Indonesian Army (KSAD)/Minister of Defense (1962–1965); National Hero of Indonesia; killed by soldiers in the 1965 coup attempt
- Maj.Gen.(Ret.) Pranoto Reksosamudro; Chief-of-Staff of the Indonesian Army (KSAD, 1965)
- Lt.Col.(Ret.) Yum Soemarsono; Pioneer of helicopter design in Indonesia
- Lt.Gen.(Ret.) Sarwo Edhie Wibowo; Commander of Kodam XVII/CEN (Pangdam Cenderawasih, 1968–1970); Commander of Special Forces Command (RPKAD/Kopassus, 1964–1967); father-in-law of S.B. Yudhoyono (6th President of Indonesia)
- Lt.Gen.(Ret.) Joes Adipermono; Commander of Army Transport (1977–1978); Commander of Army Logistics (1979–1981)
- Gen.(Ret.) Endriartono Sutarto; Commander of ABRI (Pangab, 2002–2006)
- Maj.Gen.(Ret.) Slamet Kirbiantoro; Commander of Kodam V/Jaya (Pangdam Jayakarta, 2000–2001)
- Maj.Gen.(Ret.) Imam Edy Mulyono; Force Commander of the United Nations Mission for the Referendum in Western Sahara (MINURSO, 2013–2015); Indonesian Ambassador for Venezuela (2020–2025)
- Maj.Gen.(Ret.) Khoirul Hadi; Expert Staff III for the Commander of TNI (Pa Sahli Tk. III, 2023–2024); Special Staff for the Chief-of-Staff of the Indonesian Army (Stafsus KSAD, 2024)
- Air Vice-Marshal Dr. Ir. Purwoko Aji Prabowo, M.M., M.D.S.; Pangkoopsau III/Eastern Indonesia (2021); Governor of Indonesian Air Force Academy (2023–2025); Kaskoopsudnas (2025–present)

=== High-Ranking Officials ===
- Surono, M.D.; Minister of Health in the First Hatta Cabinet (1949); Secretary General for the Ministry of Health, United States of Indonesia (1949–1950)
- Sarino Mangunpranoto; Minister of Education and Culture (1956–1957, 1966–1967); Indonesian Ambassador for Hungary (1962–1966)
- Brig.Gen.(Ret.) Subrantas Siswanto; Governor of Riau (1978–1980); Regent of Kampar (1967–1978)
- Hj. Ani Yudhoyono, S.I.P.; First Lady (2004–2014); late wife of Susilo B. Yudhoyono; daughter of Sarwo Edhie Wibowo
- Ir. H. Erman Soeparno, M.B.A., M.Si.; Minister of Manpower in the United Indonesia Cabinet I (2005–2009)
- Col.(Ret.) Rd. Soeparno; Commander of Kodam VI/MLW (Pangdam Mulawarman, 1968–1972); Member of the People's Consultative Assembly (MPR, 1972–1974); Mayor of Surabaya (1974–1979)
- Drs. Dwi Wahyu Atmaji, M.P.A.; Secretary for the Ministry of State Apparatus Utilization and Bureaucratic Reform (2014–2021)
- Dr. Hari Nur Cahya Murni; Acting Governor of Jambi (2021); Director General of Regional Development at the Ministry of Home Affairs (2020–2021)
- Hidayat Amir, Ph.D.; Director of Center for Analysis and Policy Harmonization, Ministry of Finance (2021–present)

=== Academic/Researchers ===
- Prof. Dr. Johan Hendrik Caspar Kern (a.k.a. Hendrik Kern); Professor of Linguistics at Leiden University, Netherlands; an orientalist
- Prof. Dr. André J.G.H. Kostermans; Dutch and Indonesian botanist
- Prof. Dr. Nicolaus Driyarkara, S.J.; Professor of Philosophy at the University of Indonesia (UI, 1960–1967); member of Supreme Advisory Council of Indonesia (1965–1967); Driyarkara College of Philosophy (STF Driyarkara) is named after him
- Prof. Dr. Kunto Wibisono Siswomihardjo; Rector of Sebelas Maret University (UNS, 1986–1990); the first Doctor of Philosophy graduated from Gadjah Mada University (UGM); Professor of Philosophy at UNS
- Prof. Dr.rer.soc. R. Agus Sartono, M.B.A.; Professor of Economics at UGM, Indonesia; Deputy of Education and Religion (2010–2019) and Deputy of Quality Improvement of Education and Religious Moderation (2019–present) at the Coordinating Ministry for Human Development and Cultural Affairs
- Prof. Dr. Ir. Sri Suning Kusumawardani, S.T, M.T.; Professor of Electrical and Information Engineering at UGM, Indonesia; Director of Resources at the Directorate General of Higher Education, Ministry of Higher Education, Science, and Technology of Indonesia (2025–present)
- Prof. drg. Suryono, S.H., M.M., Ph.D.; Professor of Periodontology at UGM, Indonesia; Dean of the Faculty of Dentistry, UGM (2021–2026)
- Prof. Dr. Semiarto Aji Purwanto; Professor of Anthropology at the University of Indonesia (UI); Dean of the Faculty of Social and Political Sciences (FISIPOL-UI, 2021–2025)
- Prof. Dr. Suyono, M.Si.; Professor of Statistics at the State University of Jakarta (UNJ), Indonesia; Secretary of the State University of Jakarta (2024–2029)
- Prof. Dr.Eng. Muhammad Aziz; Professor of Decarbonized Energy and Process Systems Engineering at Tohoku University, Japan
- Prof. (Asst.) Dr.Eng. Corinthias P.M. Sianipar, B.A.Sc., M.Sc., M.Eng.; Professor of Socio-Ecological Systems for Sustainable Regional Development at Kyoto University, Japan
- R.Ng. Tjitrowardojo, M.D.; one of earliest native-Indonesian (bumiputra) lecturers at STOVIA; great-grandfather of B.J. Habibie (3rd President of Indonesia); Regional Public Hospital of Purworejo (RSUD) is named after him
- Dr. Tafsir Nurchamid, Ak. M.Si.; Vice Rector II of the University of Indonesia (UI, 2007–2012)
- Dr. Yenti Garnasih, S.H., M.H.; expert of criminal law and special criminal offenses at the Trisakti University; member of KPK selection committee (2015)
- Dr. Supriyanto Rohadi, M.Si.; expert of seismology at the Indonesian Meteorology, Climatology, and Geophysical Agency (BMKG); current Head of Geophysics Research at BMKG
- Dr. Kris Sunarto, M.Si.; former cartography expert at the Geospatial Information Agency (BIG/Bakosurtanal)
- Dr.-Ing. Andry Widyowijatnoko, M.T., IAI.; expert of building architecture at the Bandung Institute of Technology (ITB)
- Dr.Eng. Imam Achmad Sadisun, S.T., M.T.; expert of applied geology at the Bandung Institute of Technology (ITB)
- Dr. Taufiq A. Kurniawan; expert in electrical engineering at the University of Indonesia

=== Artists/Sportspeople ===
- Jan Toorop; Dutch painter; his daughter (Charley Toorop) and grandson (Edgar Fernhout) were also famous painters
- Thé Tjong-Khing; illustrator based in the Netherlands; three-times winner of the Golden Stylus award (1978, 1985, 2003); winner of the Woutertje Pieterse Prize (2005); winner of the Max Velthuijs Prize (2010)
- Rempo Urip; film director
- Drs. Bambang Irawan; industrial designer; former lecturer at the Sepuluh Nopember Institute of Technology (ITS)
- Ki Timbul Hadiprayitno; traditional Indonesian puppet (wayang) master
- Herman Veenstra; Dutch water polo athlete (goalkeeper); fifth position in the Berlin 1936 Summer Olympics
- Karel Heijting; Dutch football player (midfielder); bronze medal in the London 1908 Summer Olympics
- Danurwindo; Indonesian football player (1969–1982); won Galatama (Indonesian Premier League) as coach (1989, 1990, 1994); won Piala Utama (Indonesian Community Shield) as coach (1992); Head coach of Indonesian national football team (1995–1996)
- Hera Desi Ana Rachmawati; Indonesian badminton player (2011–present); won Indonesia International (BWF International Challenge, 2012); runner-up of Malaysia International (BWF International Challenge, 2011), Vietnam Open (BWF Grand Prix, 2013), and Indonesia International (BWF International Challenge, 2014)
- Putri Patricia; Indonesian actress

=== Religious Pioneers ===
- Sunan Geseng; Muslim cleric; one of Wali Songo (nine saints); disciple of Sunan Kalijaga; Sunan Geseng Mosque in Bagelen, Purworejo is named after him
- Syekh Imam Puro; Muslim cleric
- Kyai Sadrach; Javanese Christian evangelist; founded the forerunner of Javanese Christian Church (GKJ)
- Raden Mangkusudarmo and Raden Wakyani Mangkuprabowo; Muslim clerics from Loano, Purworejo; grandfather and father (respectively) of Prof. Dr. Gen.(HOR) A.M. Hendropriyono (Head of State Intelligence Agency – BIN, 2001–2004)
