= Kutoarjo =

Town in Purworejo Regency, Central Java, Indonesia

- Town
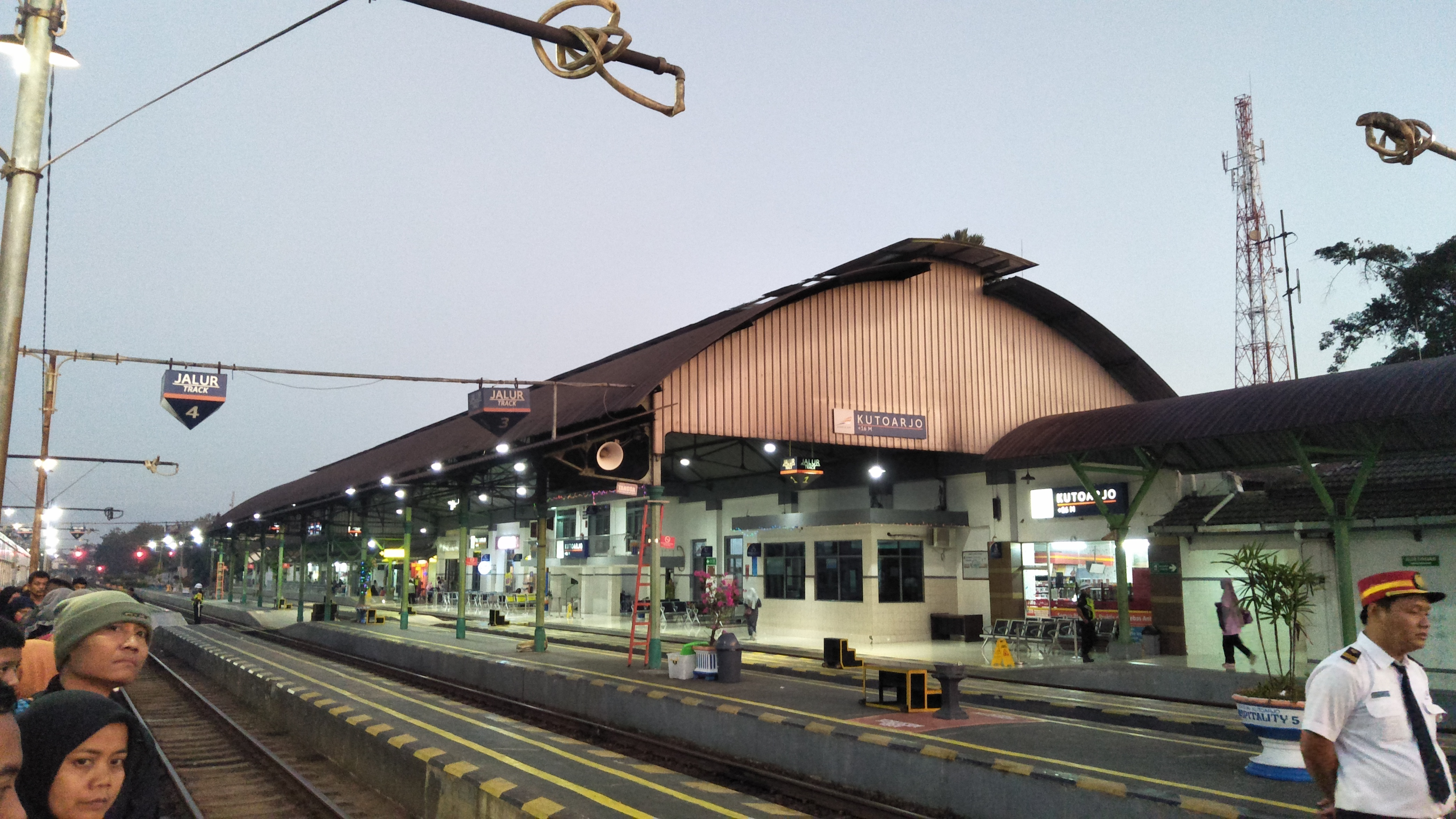
- Kutoarjo railway station

- Location in Java
- Coordinates: 7.73524°S 109.89395°E
- Country: Indonesia
- Province: Central Java
- Regency: Purworejo Regency
- Time zone: UTC+7 (WIB)

Kutoarjo is a town and district (Indonesian: Kecamatan) of Purworejo Regency, Central Java, Indonesia.
