= Sukoharjo Regency =

Regency in Central Java, Indonesia

Sukoharjo Regency Kabupaten Sukoharjo
- Regency

Other transcription(s)
  - Javanese: ꦑꦧꦸꦥꦠꦺꦤ꧀ꦯꦸꦏꦲꦂꦗ
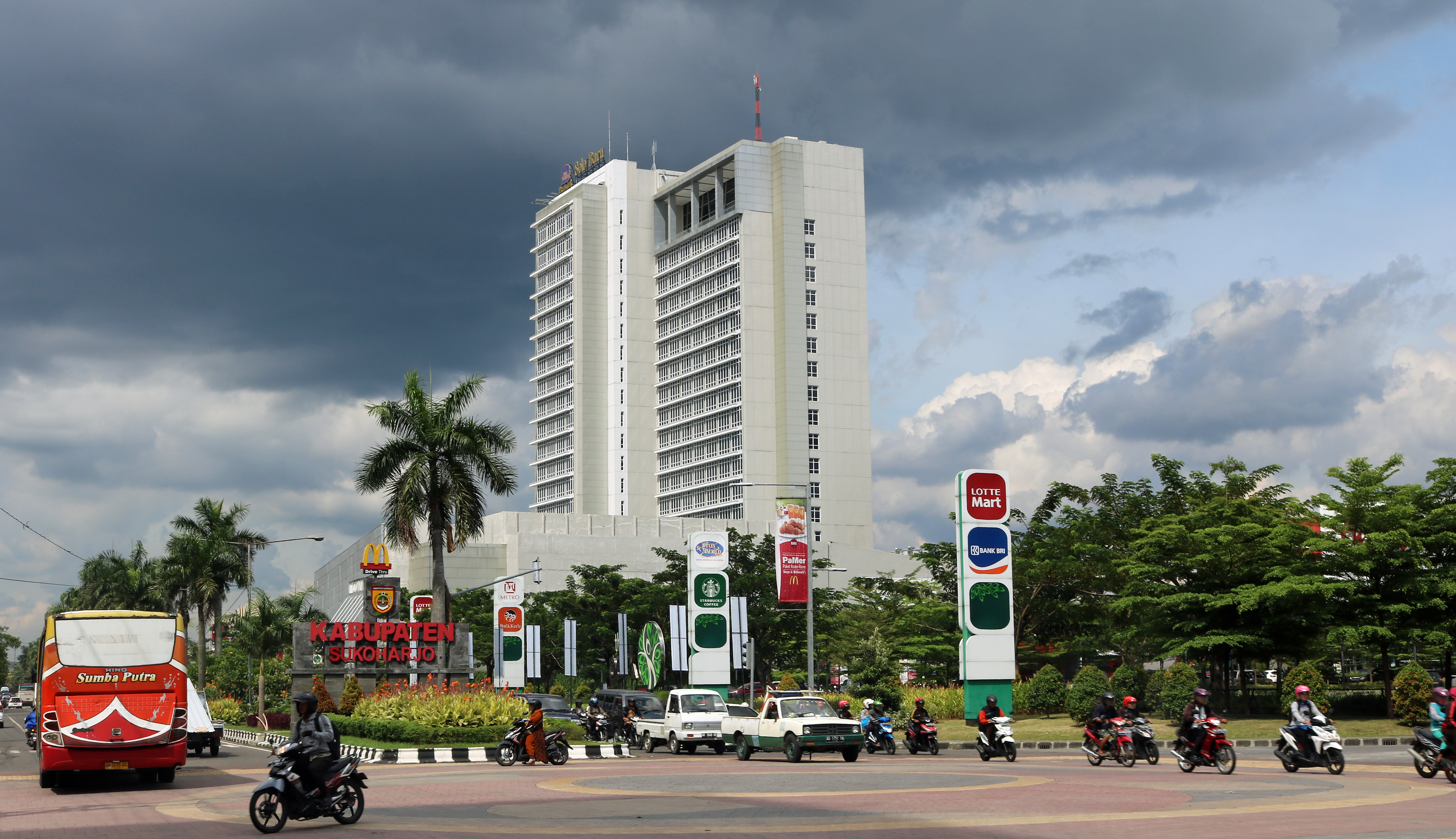
- A sign marking the entrance to the Regency

- Coat of arms

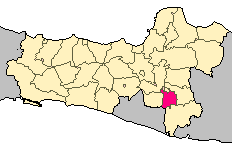
- Location within Central Java

- Location in Java and Indonesia Sukoharjo Regency (Indonesia)
- Coordinates: 7.6833°S 110.8333°E
- Country: Indonesia
- Region: Java
- Province: Central Java
- Capital: Sukoharjo

Government
  - Regent: Etik Suryani
  - Vice Regent: Eko Sapto Purnomo

Area
  - Total: 493.23 km^{2} (190.44 sq mi)

Population (mid 2025 estimate)
  - Total: 918,610
  - Density: 1,862.4/km^{2} (4,823.7/sq mi)
- Time zone: UTC+7 (IWST)
- Area code: (+62) 271
- Website: sukoharjokab.go.id

Sukoharjo Regency is a regency (Indonesian: kabupaten) in the Central Java province in Indonesia. It covers an area of 493.23 km^{2} and had a population of 824,238 at the 2010 Census and 907,587 at the 2020 Census; the official estimate as of mid 2025 was 918,610 (comprising 459,225 males and 459,385 females). Its administrative centre is in the large town of Sukoharjo, about 10 km south of Surakarta; the built-up area of the town had 324,214 inhabitants at the 1990 Census. This regency is bordered by the city of Surakarta in the north, Karanganyar Regency in the east, Wonogiri Regency and the Special Region of Yogyakarta in the south as well as Klaten Regency in the west. The regency is part of the metropolitan zone of Surakarta, which is known as Subosukawonosraten.

== Geography ==
The Solo River (known in Indonesian as Bengawan Solo) "divides" this regency into two parts. The northwestern part is commonly lowland and wavy, forming the catchment area of Surakarta city, while the southeastern part is mountainous.

Near the northern border are the suburban areas surrounding Surakarta City such as Grogol, Baki, Gatak, and Kartasura, while the whole regency lies within the metropolitan area of that city. Kartasura is the junction of the Solo-Yogyakarta track with Solo-Semarang.

Sukoharjo Regency is crossed by the Solo-Wonogiri railway, which re-opened in 2004 after being unused for many years. This railway is one of the most "dangerous" ones in Indonesia because it is located beside the main road without any barrier.

== Climate ==
Sukoharjo has a tropical monsoon climate (Am) with moderate to little rainfall from June to October and heavy rainfall from November to May. The following climate data is for the city of Sukoharjo.

Climate data for Sukoharjo
Month	Jan	Feb	Mar	Apr	May	Jun	Jul	Aug	Sep	Oct	Nov	Dec	Year
Mean daily maximum °C (°F)	29.9 (85.8)	30.0 (86.0)	30.3 (86.5)	31.3 (88.3)	30.9 (87.6)	31.0 (87.8)	30.6 (87.1)	31.4 (88.5)	32.1 (89.8)	32.5 (90.5)	31.4 (88.5)	30.6 (87.1)	31.0 (87.8)
Daily mean °C (°F)	26.1 (79.0)	26.2 (79.2)	26.3 (79.3)	26.9 (80.4)	26.4 (79.5)	26.0 (78.8)	25.4 (77.7)	25.7 (78.3)	26.6 (79.9)	27.3 (81.1)	26.8 (80.2)	26.5 (79.7)	26.4 (79.4)
Mean daily minimum °C (°F)	22.4 (72.3)	22.4 (72.3)	22.4 (72.3)	22.5 (72.5)	22.0 (71.6)	21.0 (69.8)	20.2 (68.4)	20.1 (68.2)	21.2 (70.2)	22.1 (71.8)	22.3 (72.1)	22.4 (72.3)	21.7 (71.2)
Average rainfall mm (inches)	316 (12.4)	317 (12.5)	297 (11.7)	209 (8.2)	142 (5.6)	74 (2.9)	49 (1.9)	40 (1.6)	45 (1.8)	111 (4.4)	201 (7.9)	264 (10.4)	2,065 (81.3)
Source: Climate-Data.org

== Administrative districts ==
Sukoharjo Regency is divided into twelve districts (kecamatan), tabulated below with their areas and their populations at the 2010 Census and the 2020 Census, together with the official estimates as of mid 2025. The table also includes the locations of the district administrative centres, the number of administrative villages in each district (totaling 150 rural desa and 17 urban keluraham), and its postcode.

Kode Wilayah	Name of District (kecamatan)	Area in km^{2}	Pop'n Census 2010	Pop'n Census 2020	Pop'n Estimate mid 2025	Admin centre	No. of villages	Post code
33.11.01	Weru ^{(a)}	42.83	49,147	54,795	57,856	Ngreco	13	57562
33.11.02	Bulu	54.77	27,813	34,104	37,061	Bulu	12	57563
33.11.03	Tawangsari	43.71	47,791	52,538	56,950	Lorog	12	57561
33.11.04	Sukoharjo (district)	44.31	88,046	97,020	100,555	Joho	14 ^{(b)}	57511: 57551
33.11.05	Nguter	59.64	42,059	52,309	56,017	Nguter	16	57571
33.11.06	Bendosari	52.77	51,940	61,563	65,316	Mulur	14 ^{(c)}	57521: 57528
33.11.07	Polokarto	61.90	73,264	83,748	89,083	Mranggen	17	57555 ^{(d)}
33.11.08	Mojolaban	35.33	86,038	96,533	93,349	Bekonang	15	57554
33.11.09	Grogol	30.47	127,886	128,193	122,046	Madegondo	14	57552
33.11.10	Baki	23.21	68,386	76,422	73,197	Kadilangu	14	57556
33.11.11	Gatak	19.37	46,463	54,309	54,936	Blimbing	14	57557
33.11.12	Kartasura	21.66	115,405	116,053	112,244	Singopuran	12 ^{(e)}	57161: 57169
	Totals	493.23	824,238	907,587	918,610	Sukoharjo	167	

Note: (a) Krajan desa in the south of the district forms a southwards salient into the Special Region of Jogyakarta.
(b) in all 14 are urban kelurahan (Banmati, Begajah, Bulakan, Bulakrejo, Combongan, Dukuh, Gayam, Jetis, Joho, Kenep, Kriwen, Mandan, Sonorejo and Sukoharjo).
(c) including one kelurahan - Jombor. (d) except for the village (desa) of Mranggen, which has a postcode of 57513. (e) includes two kelurahan - Kartasura and Ngadirejo.

The districts are subdivided into 150 rural desa and 17 urban kelurahan. The administrative center is located in the town of Sukoharjo.
