= Purwareja Klampok, Banjarnegara =

Purwareja klampok Kecamatan Purwareja klampok
- sub-district
- Location in Java and Indonesia Purwareja klampok (Indonesia) Purwareja klampok (Asia)
- Coordinates: 7°28′20″S 109°26′10″E
- Country: Indonesia
- Province: Central Java
- Regency: Banjarnegara

Area
  - Total: 21.87 km^{2} (8.44 sq mi)

Population (Census 2020)
  - Total: 47,657
  - Density: 2,179/km^{2} (5,644/sq mi)
- Time zone: UTC+7 (Indonesia Western Time)
- Postcode: 53474
- Area code: 0286
- Licence plate: R
- Website: banjarnegarakab.go.id

Purwareja Klampok is a sub-district in Banjarnegara Regency, Central Java Province, Indonesia. The sub-district government center is in the village of Klampok.
