= Karanganyar Regency =

Regency in Central Java, Indonesia

Karanganyar Regency Kabupaten Karanganyar
- Regency
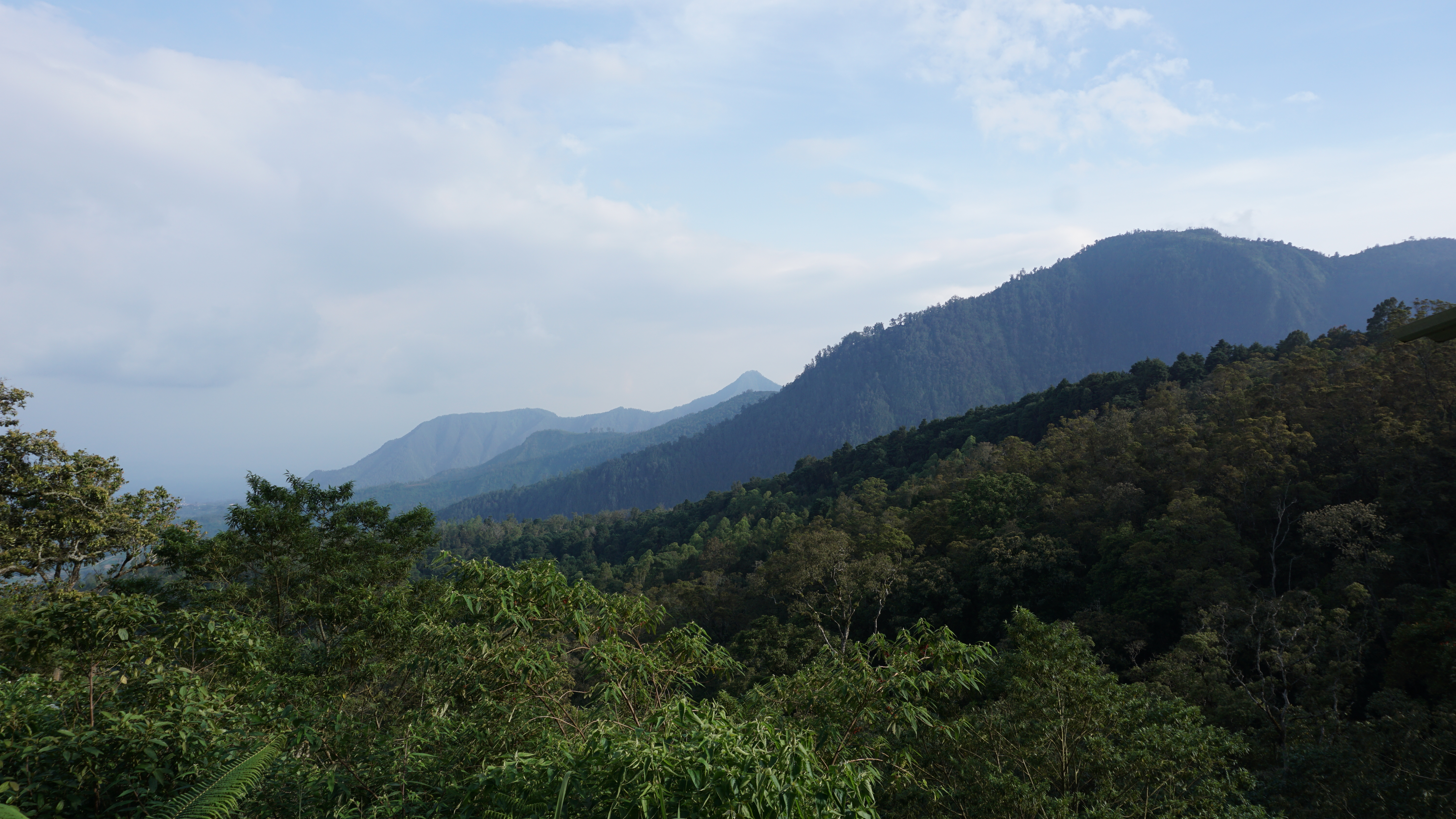
- Landscape view in Tawangmangu-Plaosan road

- Coat of arms
- Motto(s): Tenteram (Tranquil)
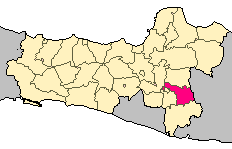
- Location of Karangayar Regency in Central Java
- Coordinates: 7°35′46″S 110°57′3″E
- Country: Indonesia
- Province: Central Java
- Established: 20 November 1917
- Capital: Karanganyar

Government
  - Regent: Rober Christanto
  - Vice Regent: Adhe Eliana

Area
  - Total: 767.79 km^{2} (296.45 sq mi)

Population (mid 2025 estimate)
  - Total: 968,484
  - Density: 1,261.4/km^{2} (3,267.0/sq mi)
- Time zone: UTC+7 (WIB)
- Area code: +62 271
- Website: karanganyarkab.go.id

Karanganyar Regency (Javanese: ꦏꦫꦁꦲꦚꦂ) is a regency in the Indonesian province of Central Java. It covers an area of 767.79 km^{2} and had a population of 813,196 at the 2010 Census and 931,963 at the 2020 Census; the official estimate as of mid 2025 was 968,484 (comprising 482,474 males and 486,010 females). Its administrative capital is the town of Karanganyar.

== Geography ==
Karanganyar Regency is located in the southeast of Central Java, Indonesia. It borders Magetan Regency (in East Java Province) in the east, Sragen Regency in the north, Wonogiri Regency and Sukoharjo Regency in the south, and Surakarta (Solo) city and Boyolali Regency in the west. The exclave of Colomadu District to the west is separated from the rest of the regency by Surakarta (Solo) city; it borders Surakarta to the east, Boyolali Regency to the north and west, and Sukoharjo Regency to the south.

Karanganyar is located between 110°40′E and 110°70′E and between 7°28′S and 7°46′S; the average height is 511 metres above sea level. Karanganyar Regency covers 76,978.64 hectares (2021 data), which consists of wetlands (19,945.67 hectares) and dry ground (56,832.97 hectares). The wet land consists of an irrigated area (7,872 hectares), divided into a technical irrigation system area (6,144 hectares), a simple irrigation area (7,134 hectares), and a rainfall rice field (1,693 hectares). Meanwhile, the areas provided for buildings are 20,732 hectares. Areas for gardening are 17,937 hectares, and for plantation are 3,251 hectares.

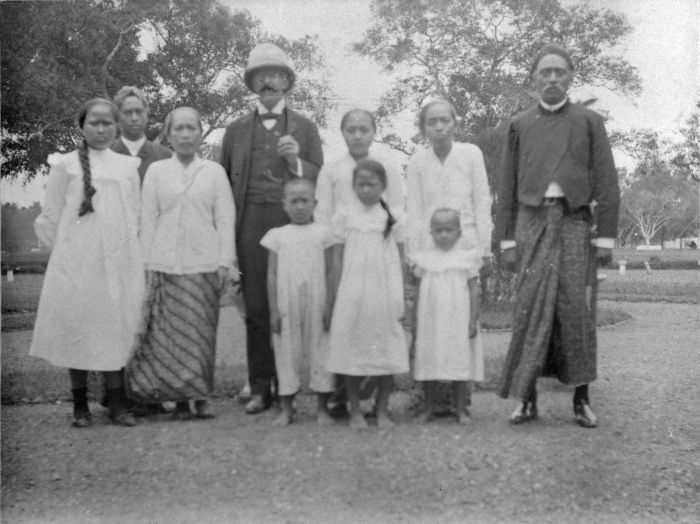
The regent of Karanganyar with his family and Dr Melchior Treub (3 August 1904)

== Administrative districts ==
Karanganyar Regency comprises seventeen districts (kecamatan), tabulated below with their areas and their populations at the 2010 Census and the 2020 Census, together with the official estimates as at mid 2025. The table also includes the locations of the district administrative centres, the number of administrative villages in each district (totaling 162 rural desa and 15 urban kelurahan), and its post code.

Kode Wilayah	Name of District (kecamatan)	Area in km^{2}	Pop'n Census 2010	Pop'n Census 2020	Pop'n Estimate mid 2025	Admin centre	No. of villages	Post code
33.13.01	Jatipuro	40.37	27,071	33,647	35,752	Jatipuro	10	57784
33.13.02	Jatiyoso	67.16	34,709	39,339	40,428	Jatiyoso	9	57785
33.13.03	Jumapolo	55.67	33,912	41,814	44,322	Jumapolo	12	57783 ^{(a)}
33.13.04	Jumantono	53.55	40,367	48,854	51,481	Jumantono	11	57782
33.13.05	Matesih	26.27	38,467	44,314	45,766	Matesih	9	57781
33.13.06	Tawangmangu	70.03	42,355	46,998	48,347	Tawangmangu	10 ^{(b)}	57792
33.13.07	Ngargoyoso	65.34	31,021	36,583	38,155	Ngargoyoso	9	57793 ^{(c)}
33.13.08	Karangpandan	34.11	37,811	43,424	44,913	Karangpandan	11	57791 ^{(d)}
33.13.09	Karanganyar (town)	43.03	74,749	84,948	87,386	Karanganyar	12 ^{(e)}	57711 - 57716
33.13.10	Tasikmadu	27.60	56,111	66,690	69,795	Tasikmadu	10	57721 - 57722
33.13.11	Jaten	25.55	78,304	84,226	87,371	Jaten	8	57731
33.13.12	Colomadu	15.64	71,097	75,313	77,551	Colomadu	11	57171 - 57179
33.13.13	Gondangrejo	56.80	72,933	87,095	91,778	Gondangrejo	13	57181 - 57188
33.13.14	Kebakkramat	36.46	58,695	64,418	66,071	Kebakkramat	10	57762
33.13.15	Mojogedang	53.31	58,144	69,372	72,708	Mojogedang	13	57752 ^{(f)}
33.13.16	Kerjo	46.82	32,797	37,593	38,748	Kerjo	10	57753 ^{(g)}
33.13.17	Jenawi	56.08	24,653	27,335	27,912	Jenawi	9	57794
	Totals	767.79	813,196	931,963	968,484	Karanganyar	177	

Notes: (a) except the desa of Kadipiro (which has a postcode of 57716). (b) including 3 kelurahan (Blumbang, Kalisoro and Tawangmangu).
(c) except for the desa of Dukuh (which has a postcode of 57731). (d) except for the desa of Harjosari (which has a postcode of 57715).
(e) all 12 rated as kelurahan (Bejen, Bolong, Cangakan, Delingan, Gayamdompo, Gedong, Jantiharjo, Jungke, Karanganyar, Lalung, Popongan and Tegalgede).
(f) except for the desa of Munggur (which has a postcode of 57716). (g) except for the desa of Karangrejo (which has a postcode of 57711).

== Population ==
The Regency had a population of 813,196 at the 2010 Census, an increase of 51,171 since the previous census in 2000. At the 2020 Census it had 931,963 inhabitants, comprising 464,784 males and 467,179 females, and in mid-2024 it had an estimated 961,969 (comprising 479,433 males and 482,476 females).

== Education ==
Based on data from the Culture and Education Department of the Karanganyar Regency, in 2005 there were: 489 primary schools; 7 private primary schools; 49 general secondary schools; 27 private secondary schools; 12 senior high schools; 5 private senior high schools; 2 SMKN units and 22 private vocation schools.

The number of students in primary schools was 81,057 students with 4,483 teachers, which made the student-teacher ratio 1 : 18.08. The numbers of junior high schools were 37,558 students with 2,818 teachers, with a student-teacher ratio of 1 : 13.33. There were 20,507 high-school students, with 1,639 teachers, which made the student-teacher ratio 1 : 12.51.

== Health ==
Based on data from the Karanganyar Regency Health Bureau in 2005, the number of health facilities consisted of 3 hospitals, 21 Public Health Centres, 60 Secondary Public Health Centres, 28 nursing-midwiferies, and 30 Clinics. Figures for health workers: there were 80 physicians, 24 dentists, 275 midwives, and 241 nurses.

== Religion ==
There are 1,821 Mosques, 679 small mosques, 127 Churches, 12 Temples and 1 Vihara.

== Heritage & Tourism ==
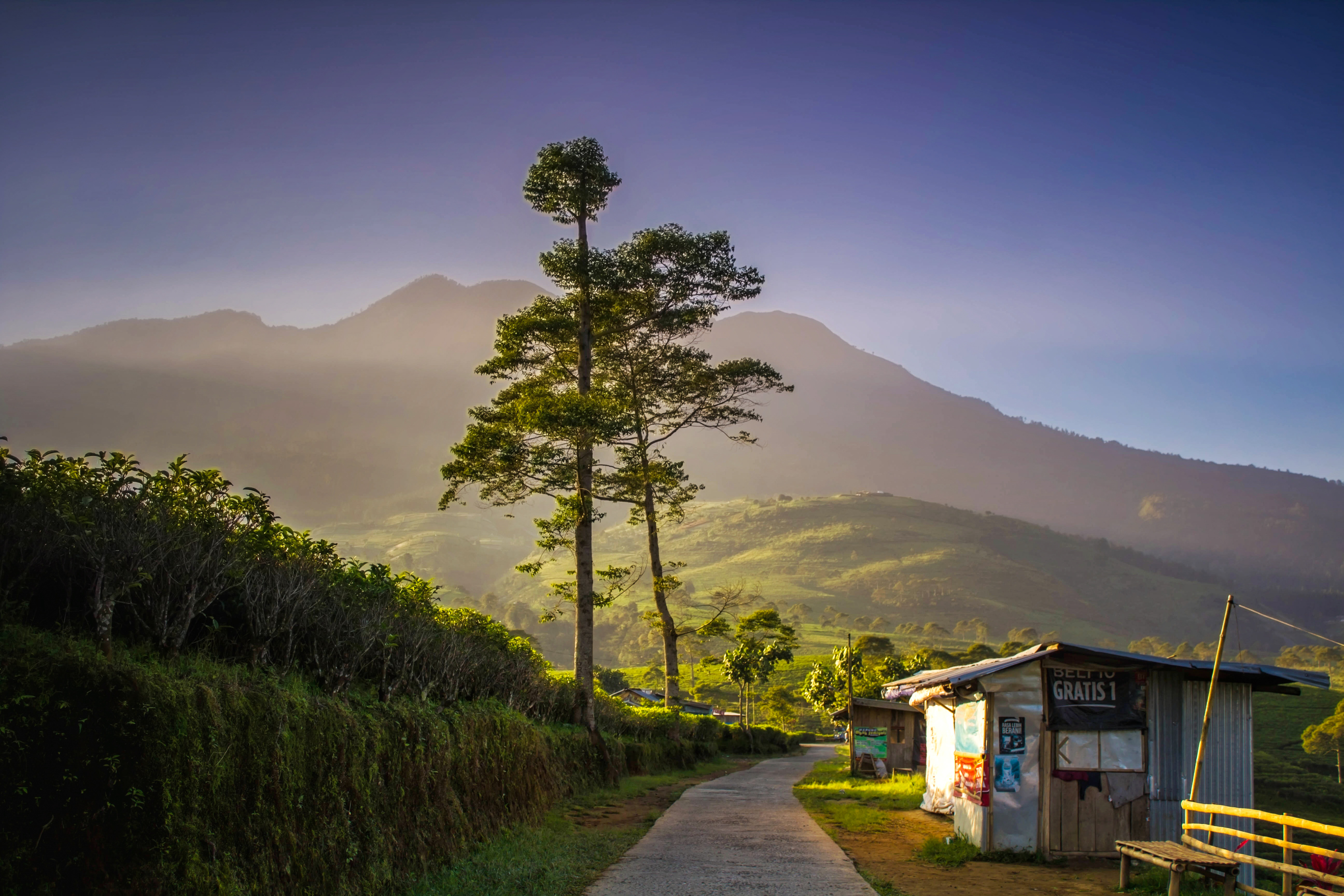
View of a Tea field at Kemuning, Karanganyar

Karanganyar is also home to the Mangadeg Hill (also known as Truloroyo) Mangkunegaran royal burial complex built upon a small mountain. In the immediate vicinity are the Pablengan ruins of ritual bathing pools, fed by seven natural springs. Several hundred metres away is the mausoleum complex of former President Suharto Astana Giribangun as well as the alleged final resting place of legendary Javanese leader Raden Mas Sambernyawa at the peak of this same hill, titled Argosari.

There are a substantial number of especially Javanese tourists who visit the Mangadeg and Argosari cemeteries to pray to Samboernowo for assistance in life, particularly business or political affairs, in line with the Kejawen or Kebatinan ancestor-worship/shamanic belief system.

Karanganyar also has a great waterfall called "Grojogan Sewu", which means "thousand waterfall", located in Tawangmangu District.

== Bio-pharmaceutical Center ==
April 2011: The research and technology ministry is sponsoring the formation of a bio-pharmaceutical center in Karanganyar Regency to improve the cultivation and post-harvest products of local farmer such as ginger, turmeric, black wild ginger, kencur.
