= Mijen =

- District
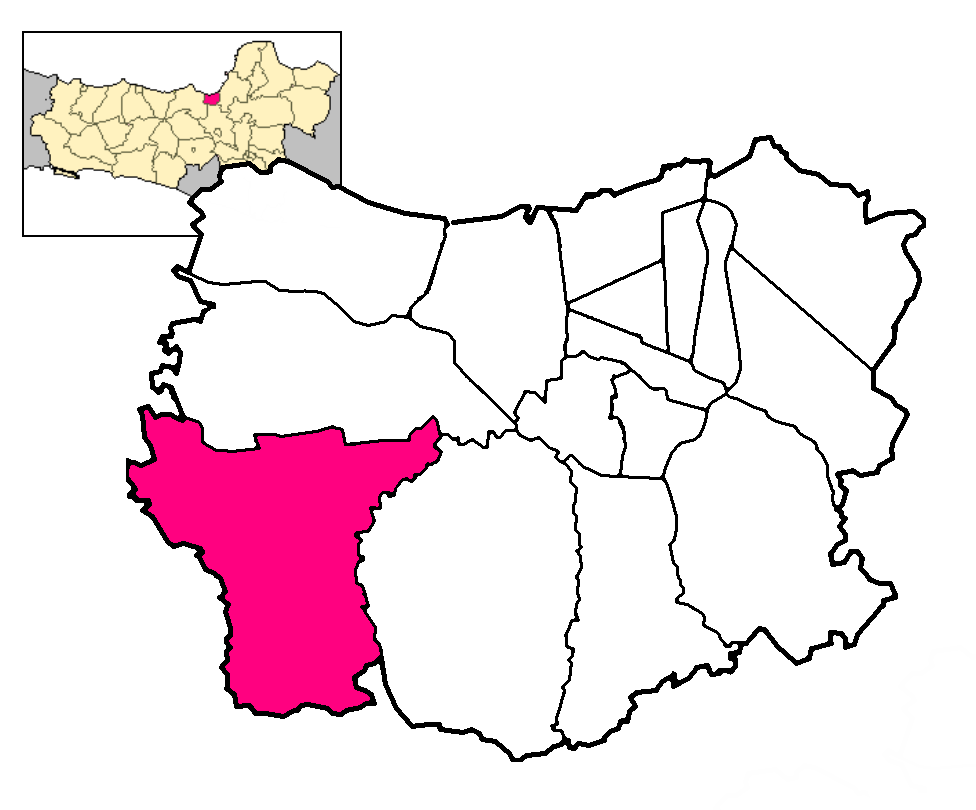
- Location map of Mijen district in Semarang
- Coordinates: 7°03′S 110°19′E
- Country: Indonesia
- Province: Central Java
- City: Semarang

Area
  - Total: 56.52 km^{2} (21.82 sq mi)

Population (2023)
  - Total: 89,950
  - Density: 1,591/km^{2} (4,122/sq mi)
- Time zone: UTC+7 (Western Indonesia Time)
- Postal code: 50211 - 50519

Mijen is an administrative district (kecamatan) in Semarang, Central Java Province, Indonesia.
