= Purworejo, Purworejo =

Regency seat of Purworejo Regency, Central Java, Indonesia

Purworejo
- Town
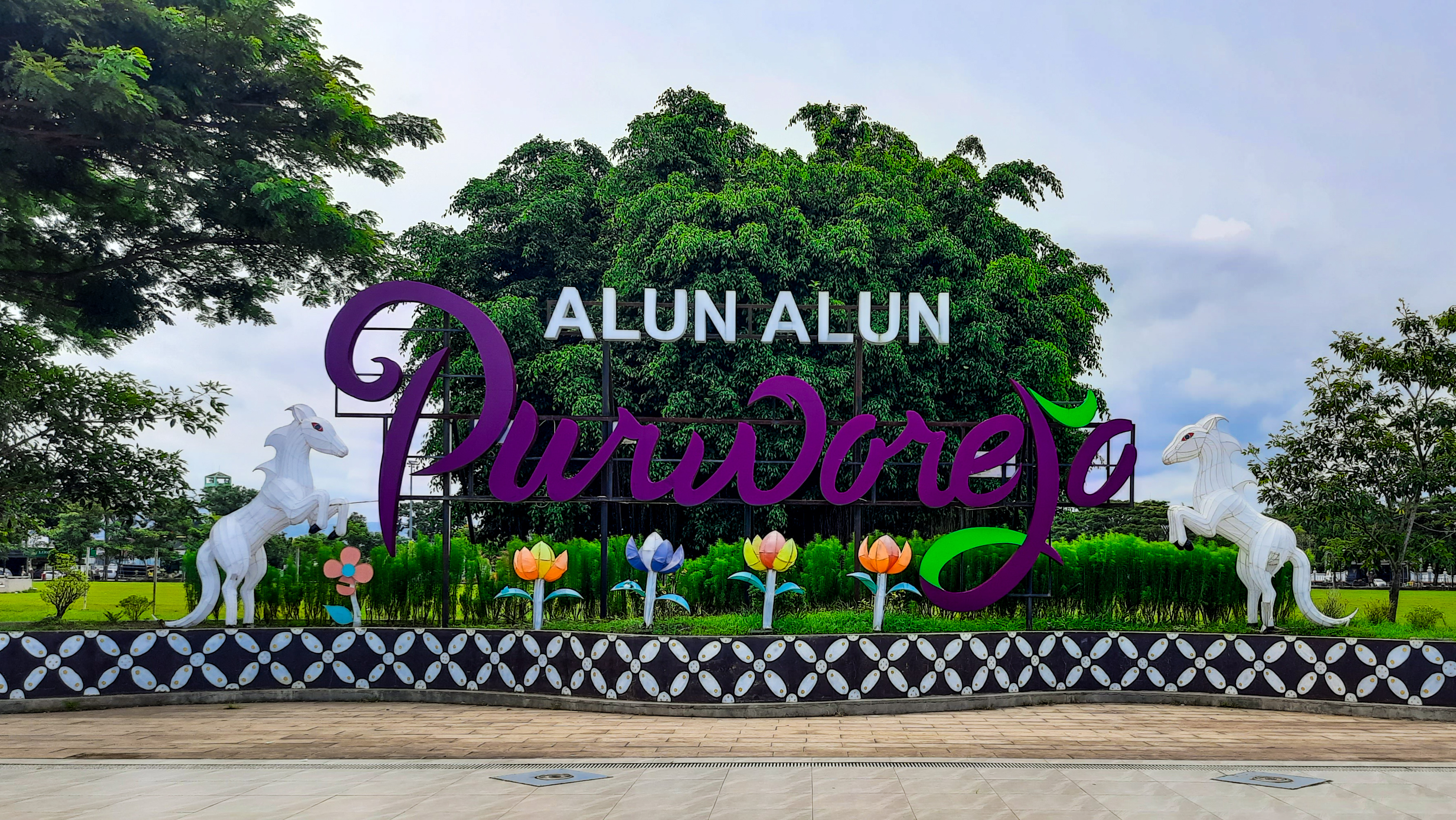
- Alun-alun Purworejo

- Location in Purworejo Regency
- Coordinates: 7.72232°S 110.03042°E
- Country: Indonesia
- Province: Central Java
- Regency: Purworejo Regency

Population (mid 2024)
  - Total: 85,595
- Time zone: UTC+7 (WIB)

Purworejo is an administrative district (kecamatan) on the island of Java, Indonesia and the administrative centre of Purworejo Regency, Central Java Province. In mid 2024 it had a population of 85,595 according to the official estimate. It is also the name of the main town of Purworejo District.

== Climate ==
Purworejo has a tropical monsoon climate (Am) with moderate to little rainfall from June to September and heavy to very heavy rainfall from October to May.

Climate data for Purworejo
Month	Jan	Feb	Mar	Apr	May	Jun	Jul	Aug	Sep	Oct	Nov	Dec	Year
Mean daily maximum °C (°F)	30.8 (87.4)	31.1 (88.0)	31.3 (88.3)	31.6 (88.9)	31.3 (88.3)	31.0 (87.8)	30.5 (86.9)	30.8 (87.4)	31.0 (87.8)	31.5 (88.7)	30.9 (87.6)	30.6 (87.1)	31.0 (87.9)
Daily mean °C (°F)	26.7 (80.1)	26.9 (80.4)	27.1 (80.8)	27.3 (81.1)	26.9 (80.4)	26.1 (79.0)	25.3 (77.5)	25.5 (77.9)	26.0 (78.8)	26.8 (80.2)	26.8 (80.2)	26.6 (79.9)	26.5 (79.7)
Mean daily minimum °C (°F)	22.7 (72.9)	22.7 (72.9)	22.9 (73.2)	23.0 (73.4)	22.6 (72.7)	21.3 (70.3)	20.1 (68.2)	20.3 (68.5)	21.1 (70.0)	22.1 (71.8)	22.7 (72.9)	22.7 (72.9)	22.0 (71.6)
Average rainfall mm (inches)	366 (14.4)	336 (13.2)	340 (13.4)	216 (8.5)	163 (6.4)	71 (2.8)	62 (2.4)	37 (1.5)	45 (1.8)	167 (6.6)	295 (11.6)	349 (13.7)	2,447 (96.3)
Source: Climate-Data.org
