= Bagelen, Purworejo =

District in Purworejo Regency, Central Java, Indonesia

Bagelen
- District
- Location in Purworejo Regency
- Coordinates: 7.81128°S 110.04006°E
- Country: Indonesia
- Province: Central Java
- Regency: Purworejo Regency
- Time zone: UTC+7 (WIB)

Bagelen is a district (Indonesian: Kecamatan) of Purworejo Regency, Central Java, Indonesia.
