= Brebes Sundanese =

Sundanese dialect

- Basa Sunda Brebes ᮘᮞ ᮞᮥᮔ᮪ᮓ ᮘᮢᮨᮘᮨᮞ᮪
- Pronunciation: [basa sʊnda brəbəs]
- Native to: Indonesia
- Region: Southern and central parts of Brebes
- Native speakers: 14% of Brebes population or 250,000 (2019)
- Language family: Austronesian: Malayo-Polynesian; Malayo-Sumbawan (?); Sundanese; Brebes Sundanese
- Writing system: Latin Alphabet (present); Sundanese script (present, optional)

Language codes
- ISO 639-3: –
- Glottolog: breb1234
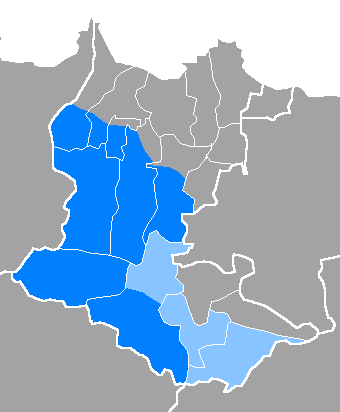
- Areas in Brebes Regency where Brebes Sundanese is a majority Areas in Brebes Regency where Brebes Sundanese is a minority

Brebes Sundanese (Sundanese: Basa Sunda Brebes, Sundanese pronunciation: [basa sʊnda brəbəs], in Sundanese script: ᮘᮞ ᮞᮥᮔ᮪ᮓ ᮘᮢᮨᮘᮨᮞ᮪) is the dialect of Sundanese language used by some people in Brebes Regency, Central Java, especially in the southern, central, and southwestern parts of the region. The area of Brebes Regency is one of the districts in Central Java which borders the West Java region.

== Language areas ==
Areas with Brebes Sundanese speakers include the districts of Salem, Bantarkawung, Ketanggungan, Banjarharjo, and several villages in Tanjung (Sarireja and Luwungbata), Larangan (Wlahar, Kamal, and Pamulihan), and Kersana (Kradenan and Sindang Jaya) districts.

The Brebes Sundanese is also spoken by smaller communities in several villages in Bumiayu (Pruwatan and Laren), Bantarkawung (Cinanas, Cibentang, Karangpari, Pangebatan, and Bantarkawung), Ketanggungan (Pamedaran, Baros, Kubangsari, Kubangjati, Dukuhbadag, and Kubangwungu), Banjarharjo (Banjarharjo, Cimunding, Ciawi, Tegalreja, and Banjar Lor), Losari (Karangjunti and Babakan), Kersana (Kubangpari and Pende), and Paguyangan (Kedungoleng) districts.

== Daily use ==
Sundanese speakers in Brebes Regency always use Sundanese as their daily language of instruction, both in the family environment and in the local community. In everyday life, such as buying and selling at the market, religious lectures at mosques, and traditional ceremonies (marriage, circumcision, thanksgiving, earth alms). Even so, the Sundanese language in Brebes Regency is only used in the spoken mode, not in the written format and until now the language is still well preserved by the speaking community.

An interesting habit that is carried out by some people in Losari, Banjarharjo, and several sub-districts in the South Brebes area is the tendency for people to do almost all their activities, such as going to school, seeking treatment, shopping, or other needs, more likely to do it to Ciledug District, namely the sub-district. which is in the east of Cirebon Regency rather than to the city of Brebes itself. This is because it is easier to get transportation to Ciledug than to Brebes. It is also influenced by the factor of the same language community which makes it easy to communicate and bond with one language.

== Characteristics ==
The difference between Sundanese Brebes and Standard Sundanese is prominent in intonation and some vocabulary, while at the level of phrases and sentences there is no difference. At the phrase level, for example:

- imah bapa = father's home
- peti suluh = wood chest
- budak bandel = brat
- hayang héés/pineuh = want to sleep
- ngakan/nyatu kéjo = eat rice
- gedé kacida = hugh
- jenuk/bera budak = many kids.

For example, the Brebes Sundanese sentence is:

- Misah/ambih lulus ujian nyanéh kudu di ajar = in order to pass the exam you have to study
- Iraha nyanéh mangkat = when are you going?
- Naha nyanéh telat? = why are you late?
- Mih, balik ti pasar = mother came home from the market
- Kakak geus indit = brother/sister already left

What is interesting is that some of the standard Sundanese vocabularies which include neutral vocabulary (not rough and also not polite) in Brebes Sundanese are always considered more polited. For example, the phrase;

- Hayang sare/pineuh = want to sleep
- dahar sangu = eat rice

In Sundanese Brebes is considered polite, even though in Standard Sundanese the two phrases mean neutral. The phrase that means wanting to sleep and eat rice in Brebes Sundanese is hayang héés and ngakan kéjo. In addition to "héés" to express the word "sleep", the word "pineuh" is also used in bantarkawung as its equivalent.

Comparison table of Sundanese Brebes and Standard Sundanese

Brebian Sundanese	Standard Sundanese	Meaning
kami	kuring	i, me
déwék	manéh	you
kita	anjeun	you (polite)
pocor	ucur	to flow
api	seuneu	fire
hiber	ngambang	to float
apik/hade	alus	good
ula	oray	snake
jegu	mentul	blunt
dolog	kendor	slow
lésang	leueur	slippery
rupit	heurin	narrow
weureu	mabok	to drunk
jenuk	loba	lots
ngaréngkol	ngagolér	to lay down
buburuh	moro	to hunt
ngacoblok	ngomong	to speak
gulung	gelut	to fight
ruag	bongkar	to disassemble
pineuh	saré	to sleep
rubiah	pamajikan	wife
mungkal	batu	stone
suluh	kai	wood
bugang	bangké	carcass
jenu	tuba	fish poison
kédé	kénca	left
dingding	bilik	wall
goah	dapur	kitchen
talang	golodog	porch
gendeng	hateup	roof
paranjé	kandang embé	sheepfold
kaso/usuk/layeus	kaso-kaso	rafter
epyan	lalangit	palate
samak	lampit	mat
budin	sampeu	cassava
hawangan	walungan	river
doyong	déngdék	tilted
balimbing	balingbing	starfruit
sabrang	cabé	chili
gandul	gedang	papaya
delima	dalima	pomegranate
albi	jeungjing	Paraserianthes falcataria
gendul	botol	bottle
hanam	hayu	let's go
agéh	geuwat	hurry up
