= Pejagan–Pemalang toll road =

Toll Road in Indonesia

Pejagan–Pemalang Toll Road
- Jalan Tol Pejagan–Pemalang
- Begalan Toll Road
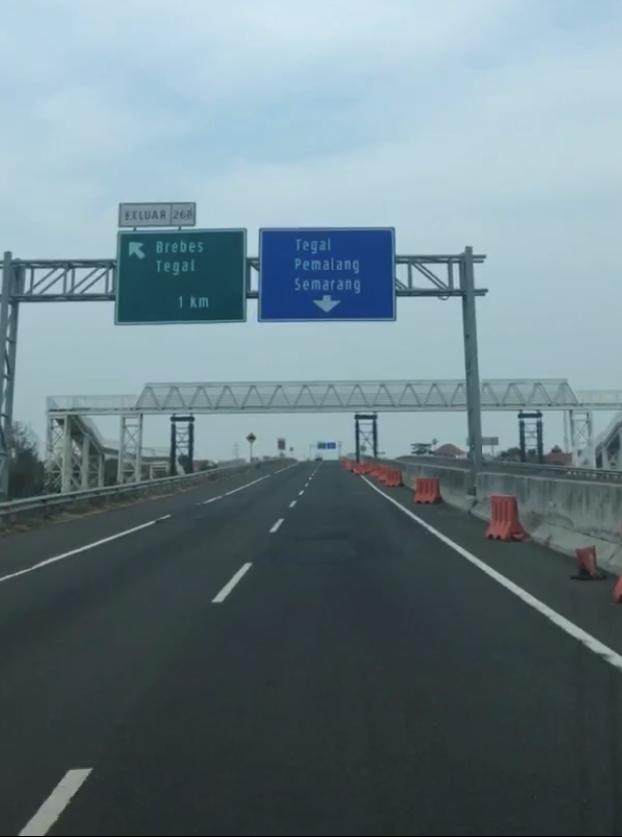
- Pejagan–Pemalang Toll Road in 2019.

Route information
- Part of AH2
- Maintained by Waskita Karya
- Length: 57.5 km (35.7 mi)
- Existed: 2014–present

Major junctions
- West end: Pejagan
- AH2 – Kanci–Pejagan Toll Road; AH2 – Pemalang–Batang Toll Road
- East end: Pemalang

Location
- Country: Indonesia
- Major cities: Brebes Regency; Tegal Regency; Pemalang Regency

Highway system
- Transport in Indonesia

Pejagan–Pemalang Toll Road is a controlled-access toll road stretching 57.5 kilometres (35.7 mi) that links Pejagan, Brebes, to Pemalang, Central Java, in Indonesia. This toll road is a continuation of the Kanci-Pejagan Toll Road and part of Trans-Java Toll Road. The toll road was fully opened on November 9, 2018 by 7th President of Indonesia Joko Widodo.

== Sections ==
The toll road project started with groundbreaking by Public Works Minister Djoko Kirmanto on July 23, 2014. Its section I and section II was inaugurated by 7th President of Indonesia Joko Widodo on June 16, 2016. Section III (East Brebes–Tegal) and IV (Tegal–Pemalang) of the toll road were targeted to be completed by March 2018. The toll is divided into four sections:

- Section I (Pejagan–West Brebes), 14.20 kilometres (8.82 mi) long, operating June 13, 2016
- Section II (West Brebes–East Brebes) 6 kilometres (3.7 mi) long, operating June 13, 2016
- Section III (East Brebes–East Tegal), 10.40 kilometres (6.46 mi) long
- Section IV (East Tegal–Pemalang), 26.90 kilometres (16.71 mi) long

== Toll gate ==
Note: The number on the exits is based on the distance from the western terminus of the Jakarta-Cikampek Toll Road, while the distance numbers are based on the distance from the western terminus of this toll road only

Province	Location	km	mi	Exit	Name	Destinations	Notes
Central Java	Tanjung, Brebes Regency	0	0.0	248	Pejagan Toll Gate	Pejagan; Prupuk; Purwokerto; Cilacap; Kanci–Pejagan Toll Road	Western terminus
Central Java	Wanasari, Brebes Regency	14.60	9.07	263	Brebes Barat Toll Gate	Bulakamba; Klampok	
Central Java	Brebes, Brebes Regency	20.63	12.82	268	Brebes Timur Toll Gate	Brebes; Tegal	
Central Java	Talang, Tegal Regency	31.24	19.41	279	Tegal Toll Gate	Slawi; Tegal; Guci	
Central Java	Taman, Pemalang Regency	64.03	39.79	312	Pemalang Toll Gate	Pemalang; Comal	Eastern terminus
Central Java	Taman, Pemalang Regency	64.10	39.83	Pemalang–Batang Toll Road			
1.000 mi = 1.609 km; 1.000 km = 0.621 mi: Route transition

== See also ==
- Brebes Exit, a toll exit within the toll road known for its 2016 deadly incident.
- Banjaratma Heritage Rest Area
