= Brebes (disambiguation) =

Brebes may refer to several places in Indonesia:

- Brebes Regency, a regency in Central Java
- Brebes District, a district in Brebes Regency
- Kelurahan Brebes, an administrative village (kelurahan) in Brebes District
