= Sindangheula, Brebes =

Sindangheula is a village in the administrative district of Banjarharjo, Brebes Regency, Central Java, Indonesia. It borders Bandungsari to the north and west, Salem to the south and Bladonggan and Ketanggungan to the east.

== History ==
A dam was installed in February 2022, as part of a wider government plan. There was flooding in the area caused by the dam on 1 March 2022; as of 2024, there were still people filing a suit for damage.

== Politics ==
Ratu Rachmatu Zakiyah-Najib Hamas is the current mayor, obtaining 333 votes in the April 2025 election.

== Economy ==
The city is used mainly for materials such as coffee, sticky tape, opak and more.
