= Larangan =

Larangan may refer to:

- Larangan, Brebes, an administrative district in Brebes Regency, Central Java, Indonesia
- Larangan, Tangerang, a town and administrative district of Tangerang City, Banten Province, Indonesia

== See also ==
- Larangan Prison, the setting of the 2016 film Apprentice
