= Bumiayu, Brebes =

District in Brebes Regency, Jawa Tengah Province, Indonesia

Coordinates: 7.26201°S 108.98642°E

Bumiayu
- Administrative District
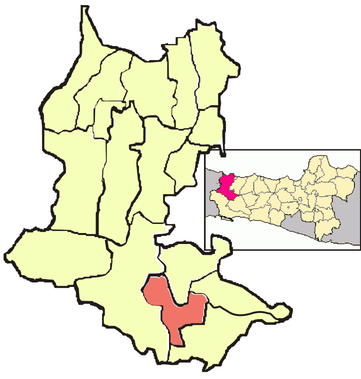
- Location in Brebes Regency
- Country: Indonesia
- Province: Central Java
- Regency: Brebes

Area
  - Total: 82.09 km^{2} (31.70 sq mi)
- Elevation: 250 m (820 ft)

Population (2020 Census)
  - Total: 112,680

Bumiayu District is an administrative district (kecamatan) in the Brebes Regency, Central Java, Indonesia. Bumiayu is the centre of community activity in the south of Brebes Regency. It covers 82.09 km^{2} and had a population of 96,201 at the 2010 Census and 112,680 at the 2020 Census. It formerly included those areas which now form the separate districts of Tonjong, Sirampog and Paguyangan.

One feature in Bumiayu is Pasar Wage, a market that opens only once every five days according to the Javanese calendar. In the city of Bumiayu, the majority of the population is engaged in trading. The trading area extends from Talok to Jatisawit, encompassing markets such as Pasar Talok, Pasar Bumiayu, Pasar Majapahit, and Pasar Jatisawit.

To alleviate traffic congestion in Bumiayu, the Government of Brebes Regency constructed the South Ring Road, located to the east of the urban area of Bumiayu. This road stretches from Talok to Pagojengan in the Paguyangan sub-district.

== Notable figures ==
- Yahya Muhaimin, a former Minister of Education of the Republic of Indonesia
- Achmad Faris Sulchaq, Former Vice Regent of Brebes
- Tasdik Kinanto, Former Secretary of the Ministry of State Apparatus Empowerment and Bureaucratic Reform
- Suwarno Hadisusanto, Professor of Ecology and Conservation Biology UGM, Dean of Faculty of Biology UGM (2012-2016)
- Titiek Sandhora, Artist and Singer
- Sigit Iko Sugondo, Community Empowerment Expert, Director of Al Azhar Peduli Ummat
- Arif Rahman Hakim, Secretary General of the General Elections Commission of the Republic of Indonesia
- Parto Patrio, Comedian
- Umi Hadiyanti, MC Wedding.

== Geography ==
Bumiayu District is situated in upland areas and benefits from major transportation routes, including the Tegal Tegal – Navan road. It also has rail access to Cirebon-Purwokerto and Jakarta-Yogyakarta-Surabaya. The Bumiayu railway station Bumiayu serves as an important transportation hub in the area.

== Economy ==
The district's economy is diverse, with various sectors contributing to its development. Agriculture plays a significant role, with the fertile land supporting the cultivation of crops such as rice, vegetables, and fruits. Additionally, trade and services sectors have grown, catering to the needs of the local population.

== Culinary delights ==
Bumiayu is renowned for its delicious culinary offerings. Local specialties include Mendoan Tempeh/Dage, Cimplung (boiled sweet potatoes/cassava/coconut in coconut sap during the production of palm sugar), Sogol, Opak Petis, Ondol, Kempong, Ketan Pencok, Kupat Tahu, and Kerupuk Rambak. There is also a durian center in Kaligadung.

Sogol: Sogol is a popular breakfast dish in Bumiayu. It is served with banana leaves and accompanied by fried snacks and lontong (rice cake). Previously, this culinary delight was only available from street vendors, but now there are comfortable dining establishments where you can enjoy it.

Ketan Pencok: Ketan Pencok is a sweet dish made from sticky rice and sugar. It can only be found in Bumiayu. You can try it on Jalan Pangeran Diponegoro, Dukuhturi, Kalierang, Bumiayu District, Brebes Regency.

Dage: Dage is a snack made from leftover ingredients, such as peanut or tofu residue. It is often prepared as a fried dish or as crispy chips. You can easily find Dage snacks from street vendors or fried chip stores. Raw Dage ingredients can also be found in local markets.

Kraca: Kraca is a traditional snack that is becoming rarer to find in Bumiayu, but it still holds its status as a local specialty. It is made from snails or clams known as "tutut" and seasoned with unique and spicy flavors. Although it may require some effort to consume due to the shells, Kraca is delicious and highly sought after.

Mendoan: Mendoan is a well-known dish that is also popular in Purwokerto. However, Bumiayu adds its own twist to this fried snack by incorporating different ingredients, making it even more delightful and tasty.

== Transportation ==
Bumiayu District enjoys convenient transportation connections. The Tegal – Navan road provides access to neighboring areas, while the railway station facilitates travel to important cities and regions. These transportation networks contribute to the district's accessibility and economic development.

== Tourist attractions ==
Tourist attractions in the Bumiayu area include Buaran Hot Springs, Pakujati Hot Springs in Paguyangan, tea plantations, Ranjeng Lake, and the Japanese Cave in Kaligua. Additionally, Penjalin Reservoir in Patuguran is in close proximity to Bumiayu. Other nearby attractions include Guci Tegal and Baturraden in Purwokerto.

== Infrastructure ==
In 2003, the Government of Brebes Regency constructed the Bumiayu Ring Road, spanning approximately 6.5 km from Kaligadung to Pagojengan. This road was built to alleviate traffic congestion in the city center of Bumiayu, allowing the Tegal-Purwokerto route and vice versa to bypass the city.

Currently, a new Bumiayu terminal is under construction along the Bumiayu Ring Road to accommodate the increasing number of transportation vehicles and address congestion at the intersection in front of the old terminal.

== Formation of Bumiayu Regency ==
Currently, there is a growing discourse regarding the formation of Bumiayu Regency as a separate entity from Brebes Regency. Geographically, the southern region of Brebes Regency is quite distant from the capital city. Culturally, the Bumiayu dialect differs significantly from the Tegal dialect spoken in the northern part of Brebes Regency. Some indigenous people even consider themselves more as "Bumiayu" natives than residents of "Brebes Regency."

== Climate ==
Bumiayu has a tropical rainforest climate (Af) with heavy to very heavy rainfall year-round.

Climate data for Bumiayu
Month	Jan	Feb	Mar	Apr	May	Jun	Jul	Aug	Sep	Oct	Nov	Dec	Year
Mean daily maximum °C (°F)	29.9 (85.8)	30.1 (86.2)	30.5 (86.9)	30.6 (87.1)	30.7 (87.3)	30.3 (86.5)	29.7 (85.5)	29.9 (85.8)	30.4 (86.7)	30.9 (87.6)	30.6 (87.1)	30.3 (86.5)	30.3 (86.6)
Daily mean °C (°F)	26.0 (78.8)	26.1 (79.0)	26.4 (79.5)	26.5 (79.7)	26.6 (79.9)	25.9 (78.6)	25.4 (77.7)	25.4 (77.7)	25.8 (78.4)	26.4 (79.5)	26.5 (79.7)	26.2 (79.2)	26.1 (79.0)
Mean daily minimum °C (°F)	22.2 (72.0)	22.1 (71.8)	22.3 (72.1)	22.5 (72.5)	22.5 (72.5)	21.6 (70.9)	21.1 (70.0)	20.9 (69.6)	21.3 (70.3)	22.0 (71.6)	22.4 (72.3)	22.2 (72.0)	21.9 (71.5)
Average rainfall mm (inches)	430 (16.9)	382 (15.0)	418 (16.5)	322 (12.7)	249 (9.8)	148 (5.8)	129 (5.1)	122 (4.8)	186 (7.3)	319 (12.6)	385 (15.2)	429 (16.9)	3,519 (138.6)
Source: Climate-Data.org
