= Al-Ittihad Mosque Jatibarang =

Mosque in Brebes, Central Java, Indonesia

Al-Ittihad Mosque

Religion
- Affiliation: Islam
- Branch/tradition: Sunni

Location
- Location: Brebes, Indonesia
- Interactive map of Al-Ittihad Mosque
- Coordinates: 6°57′52″S 109°3′16″E

Architecture
- Architect: Ittihad Team
- Type: Mosque
- Completed: 3 March 2008
- Construction cost: 8 billion rupiah (USD 15 million)

Specifications
- Capacity: > 10,000
- Dome: 1
- Dome dia. (outer): 20 m
- Minaret: 2
- Minaret height: 40 m

Al-Ittihad is the name of a mosque in Jatibarang Lor village of Jatibarang District in Brebes Regency, Indonesia.

== Development process ==
Al-Ittihad Mosque, which started on 6 March 2001, was completed and inaugurated on 3 March 2008. Plant development is completed in 4 years and eventually resigns from the schedule due to the increase in building materials resulting from the increase in other basic needs. This mosque will become a community icon for Jatibarang Brebes because the shape of a unique and luxurious. This mosque stands on the whole 5000 m2 of land and can accommodate 10,000 jamaah. Al-Ittihad Mosque that now there is the result of the relocation of a mosque south of the market there Jatibarang, of course, before the relocated discussion the ulama and community leaders in Jatibarang. Relocation process itself is supported and assisted by the Regent of Brebes Mr. Tajudin Nur Ali was tense and construction cost not less than 8 billion rupiah.

== Inauguration ==
Development of this mosque by one of the ulama KH. Rosyidi Malawi. This mosque was inaugurated by vice president Jusuf Kalla on 3 March 2008. The inauguration ceremony was attended by not less than 250,000 people from various regions in Indonesia.

== Source of funds ==
Source of development funds Mosque Al-Ittihad, 80% came from Jatibarang Community and its surrounding areas, and 20% more donations from regional governments Brebes, Central Java province, National Politics and the figure donations from abroad. In the 2001 Budget Plan Development Mosque is only about 2.5 billion rupiah. Since the rise of almost all basic materials (although secera gradually from year to year) is not a surefire budget total 8 billion rupiah. and also influenced by the duration of the development process.

== Building structure ==
This mosque has two minaret with a peak elevation of approximately 40 meter above the ground. With a large dome surrounded by 8 small dome. The mosque 2 only have 1 pulpit preaching, 1 mihrab, 4 main pillars buffer. 2 where Wudu, 2 MCK, 3 office managers, 1 library and the mosque as the front page of parks and parking places.

== See also ==
- Timeline of Islamic history
- Islamic architecture
- Islamic art
- List of mosques in Asia
- Islam in Indonesia
- Indonesian architecture
