= Jatibarang =

Jatibarang is the name of various places in Indonesia.

Two kecamatan (districts):

- Jatibarang, Brebes, Brebes Regency, Central Java
- Jatibarang, Indramayu, Indramayu Regency, West Java

Five desa (administrative villages):

- Jatibarang, Mijen, Semarang, Central Java
- Jatibarang Kidul, Jatibarang, Brebes, Central Java
- Jatibarang Lor, Jatibarang, Brebes, Central Java
- Jatibarang Baru, Jatibarang, Indramayu, West Java
- Jatibarang, Jatibarang, Indramayu, Jatibarang, Indramayu, West Java
