= Yahya A. Muhaimin =

Indonesian politician (1943–2022)

22nd Minister of National Education of Indonesia
- In office 23 October 1999 – 22 July 2001
- President: Abdurrahman Wahid
- Preceded by: Juwono Soedarsono
- Succeeded by: Abdul Malik Fadjar

Personal details
- Born: 29 September 1943 Brebes, Central Java, Japanese-occupied Dutch East Indies
- Died: 9 February 2022 (aged 78) Purwokerto, Central Java, Indonesia

Yahya A. Muhaimin (17 May 1943 – 9 February 2022), also known as Jahja Muhaimin, was an Indonesian politician who served as Education Minister from 1999 to 2001.

== Biography ==
Yahya was born on 29 September 1943 in Bumiayu and given the name A. Muhaimin. (Note: According to his own testimony, his real birth date is 29 September 1943, but it is written 17 May 1943 on official documents; 17 is his birth date on the Hijri calendar, (17 Ramadan), and May is the month when he was asked when was he born by his teacher. His birth name is Yahya, but according to the tradition, one's father's name is to be included to one's name; as such, his name became Yahya bin Abdul Muhaimin (Yahya, the son of Abdul Muhaimin), or simply Yahya Abdul Muhaimin.) Yahya's parents were Djazuli (who later changed his name to Haji Abdul Muhaimin after going on the hajj), a batik merchant, and Zubaidah. At the age of 6, Yahya studied at Madrasah Ibtidaiyah Ta`allumul Huda', an Islamic elementary school managed by his grandfather and several other family members. The following year he enrolled in Sekolah Rakyat Negeri 5 (SR-5), a state elementary school, on his own wishes. He was a student at both schools during the same period: from morning until noon he attended Ta`allamul Huda', then he continued at SR-5 until evening. For two years during this period he studied tajwid and read the Quran after Subuh (during the dawn hours). In the next three years, Yahya learned fiqh, tafsir, tarikh, and the hadiths from several ulama (scholars of Islam).

Yahya was also active in scouting activities. He was a member of Pandu Islam, an Islamic scouting organization. He had been chosen as one of the representatives of the organization to take part in International Jamboree in Manila, the Philippines; however, his father forbade him from attending. After graduating in 1956 from SR-5 and Ta`allamul Huda' (the madrasah took one year longer) he continued to Sekolah Menengah Islam (Islamic junior high school) on his parents' orders, although he wanted to study at SMP Negeri Brebes (Brebes State Junior High School).

After graduating from junior high school Yahya wanted to continue his studies in Yogyakarta. His father was not comfortable and wanted Yahya to study at Pesantren Gontor, but still he allowed Yahya to study there. In Yogyakarta, Yahya attempted to enroll at SMA Negeri 3/B. However, the registration deadline had passed and he was instead accepted at SMA Muhammadiyah 1 Yogyakarta, run by the Islamic organization Muhammadiyah. However, on the first day of studies, a messenger told him that he was to return home. The two went to Bumiayu first, and traveled to Tegal. There Yahya attended SMA Negeri 1 Tegal. At this school he was not comfortable because of the hot weather; plus he went to school at noon. In the end of August 1959 he returned home and told his father he wanted to transfer to SMA Negeri 1 Purwokerto, a wish his father granted. However, in Purwokerto he was rejected because there were no openings. The headmaster recommended that he enroll in a public high school first, and then attempt a transfer. Yahya registered at SMA Muhammadiyah Purwokerto, and after a quarter semester he was able to transfer to the state school.

In the second year of high school Yahya won a scholarship to study in the US for one year (1962–1963) through an American Field Service International Scholarship. He flew from Halim Perdanakusuma, Jakarta, to Moline Airport, Illinois; he was then welcomed by the Hohn family, a family he lived with. From Moline they rode a car to Grand Mound, Iowa. There Yahya studied at Central Community High School (CCHS), De Witt. He had trouble when he wanted to find a mosque; the nearest mosque was in Cedar Rapids, 90 km from the Hohns' house. He became the secretary of Student Council in the school. Almost every Sunday he went to church accompanying the Hohn family praying. Starting in December he also made a speech in several places in the city which was a task from AFS. He met President Kennedy at White House's yard in May 1963. Yahya went back to Indonesia in July 1963 after one year studying there. 5 months after his return to Indonesia Yahya wrote a letter telling that he was impressed by De Witt people and the letter was contained in The De Witt Observer edition 26 December 1963.

After graduating from high school, Yahya enrolled at public administration department, Gadjah Mada University. Although the registration deadline had passed he was accepted because he was a returnee of AFS and was recommended by Department of Foreign Affairs. One year later he moved to international relations department. At this department he met Amien Rais and Ichlasul Amal. Later in February 1968 Yahya began to write thesis proposal. His supervisor was Soeroso Prawirohardjo, a Gadjah Mada chancellor candidate that time. Yahya was ordered to find and to read works written by Daniel Lev, Herbert Feith, and Guy Pauker as references for his thesis. From October 1968 until September 1969 Yahya (and was with Choifah after marriage) hunted the works in Yogyakarta, Bandung, and Jakarta; he obtained the works more than he should find such as works written by Harold Crouch, Max Millikan, Wilson McWilliams, General A.H. Nasution, and Soedjatmoko. He also could interview General A.H. Nasution, Lieutenant General Ali Murtopo, and other generals. On 3 November 1968 he married Choifah, his childhood lover. His thesis was finished around one year and a half in December 1970. In February 1971 it was tested in a trial thesis and got passed. The same year as Yahya enrolled to Gadjah Mada University, he also signed up at comparative religion, IAIN Sunan Kalijaga; however in the third year he signed out because of the conflicted exam schedule. He also joined Himpunan Mahasiswa Islam and Ikatan Mahasiswa Muhammadiyah. Graduated from Gadjah Mada, Yahya was offered a lecturer position in international relations department by Soeroso, his former supervisor. Yahya initially rejected it; however, with some considerations he accepted it and taught there. In 1977 he wanted to study further and considered scholarship program such as Ford Foundation, USAID, and Rockefeller Foundation. He chose the latter as suggested by Soeroso and was accepted at MIT, besides he applied at Yale and Cornell. There, in Greater Boston Area, Yahya met some Indonesian students studying in various universities; they then formed a community named Permasi (Persatuan Mahasiswa Indonesia; Indonesian Students Association) and Yahya was appointed the chairman. He also took some courses at Harvard and became the member of JOSPOD (Joint Seminar on Political Development Harvard-MIT) in 1980 which enabled him to meet Alfred Stepan, Robert Dahl, Samuel P. Huntington, and other professors. Yahya completed his college for around four years and eight months. He then continued to doctoral program and graduated in 1982.

== Works and legacy ==
In 1973 his thesis was named as the best thesis by the university and was published as a book titled Perkembangan Militer dalam Politik di Indonesia 1945–1966 by Gadjah Mada University Press. Yahya claimed that it was precisely because he was married to Choifah so she could help him in his thesis.

Yahya's dissertation Indonesian Economic Policy, 1950–1980: the Politics of Client Businessmen was published as a book by LP3ES (Lembaga Penelitian Pendidikan dan Penerangan Ekonomi dan Sosial) and was renamed Bisnis dan Politik, Kebijakan Ekonomi Indonesia 1950–1980. It was printed for 5,000 copies; three months later it was reprinted for 20,000 copies. He wrote on his dissertation that Indonesia in 1950–1980, although it used different political system—Parliamentary Democracy, Guided Democracy, and New Order—the results remained the same. Tempo magazine, on 11 May 1991, wrote "this is an outstanding achievement that have ever been accomplished in history of scientific books in Indonesia", (Note: Original: "Inilah prestasi luar biasa yang pernah dicapai dalam riwayat buku ilmiah di Indonesia".) while on 18 May Sofian Effendi, writing for Editor, stated that it was "the best seller book". (Note: Original: "Buku paling laris".) On 24 May 1991, however, Probosutedjo, a businessman who is also Soeharto's brother-in-law, sued the book's author because he felt maligned. He also demanded an apology from Yahya and withdrawal of the book from circulation. Yahya accepted the suit, although he was supported and was suggested to counter sue Probosutedjo by academics and lawyers such as Sofian Effendi (Gadjah Mada's chancellor at that time), Lucian W. Pye (Yahya's supervisor at MIT), Nono Anwar Makarim (legal adviser), and Todung Mulya Lubis (expert lawyer). One year later, Ismet Fanani claimed that the book was a copy of Richard Robison's Capitalism and the Bureaucratic State in Indonesia, 1965–1975. However, Daniel Dhakidae, a Cornell graduate researcher writing for Kompas 22 November 1992 edition, states that both books are different.

== Death ==
Yahya died in Purwokerto, Central Java on 9 February 2022, at the age of 78.

== Bibliography ==
- Busyairi, Badruzzaman (2012). Tiga Kota Satu Pengabdian: Jejak Perjalanan Yahya A. Muhaimin. Yogyakarta: Tiara Wacana. ISBN 9789791262538.
