= Dukuhjati Wetan =

Dukuhjati Wetan Dukuhjati Wetan, Dhukuhjati Wétan
- Village
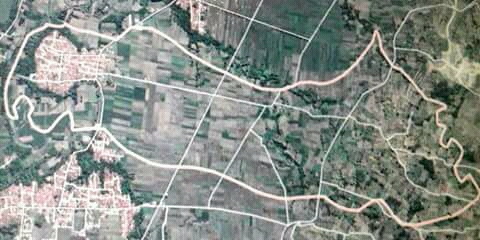
- Etymology: The Teak Hamlet in the East
- Nickname: Dujawe
- Dukuhjati Wetan in Central Java, ID Dukuhjati Wetan (Indonesia)
- Coordinates: 6°56′56″S 109°12′26″E
- Country: Indonesia
- Province: Central Java
- City/ Regency: Tegal
- District: Kedungbanteng
- Founder: Mbah Kadiman
- Named for: The Giant Golden Teak

Government
  - Body: Dukuhjati Wetan Village Government
  - Head of Village: Pahrurodin
- Elevation: 34 m (112 ft)
- Demonym: Dujawean
- Time zone: UTC+7 (Indonesia Western Time)
- Postcode: 52472

Dukuhjati Wetan (Indonesian pronunciation: [dukʊhˌd͡ʒat̪i ˈwet̪an]; Javanese: Dhukuhjati Wétan), abbreviated as Dujawe (pronounced [duˈd͡ʒawe]), is one of the villages located in the Kedungbateng District, Tegal, Central Java, Indonesia.

== History ==
Among the stories that describe the beginning of the name of Dukuhjati Wetan, perhaps this version is fitting to tell the beginning of the name of Dukuhjati Wetan. The founder of this village is Mbah Kadiman, he came from Paketiban Village who then migrated to this region. Dukuhjati Wetan was once an unnamed hamlet and has a population of about 600 people. It is said that this area there is a giant golden tree that sometimes appears at night and not everyone can see it, people here call it by name "Golden Teak Tree" which supposedly located in the middle of kedung, "kedung" here is part of the river which is deeper than other parts because there is a basin in the bottom of the river. Previously this area will be combined with Kedungbanteng Village, but the people here refuse and want to stand on their own. From there Mbah Kadiman formed this region into a village and gave it the name as Kedungjati Village, but the name of that village is not used because there is another village that has used it first. In the end, it was replaced by the name of the village of Dukuhjati Wetan which may be more fitting with the condition of its territory, namely "hamlet" which has "giant teak" and geographical location of its territory located in "wetan" (=east) river which containing the kedung.

== Geography ==
Dukuhjati Wetan is one of the villages located in the western part of Kedungbanteng, Tegal with geographical location 6° 57' 59" S and 109° 11' 40.9" E. The western part of the village of Dukuhjati Wetan is lowland and there is a residential area. While the east is the rice fields, plantations and hills. On the border of Rancawiru Village, in the west there is a river that flows named Cacaban River which hails in Cacaban Lake and also as a dividing boundary between these two villages, in the middle of this village there is also Windusari River which serves as an irrigation inspection channel.

== Boundaries ==
The boundaries of the village of Dukuhjati Wetan are as follows:

North	Sumingkir Village, Balamoa Village
South	Kedungbanteng Village
West	Rancawiru Village
East	Karangmalang Village

== Population ==
=== Population spread ===
The population distribution of this village is uneven, almost the entire population is settled to the west of Dukuhjati Wetan Village.

=== Administrative division ===
The village is divided into 8 Rukun Warga (RW) and 16 Rukun Tetangga (RT).

RW	I		II		III		IV		V		VI		VII		VIII	
RT	01	02	03	04	05	06	07	08	09	10	11	12	13	14	15	16

=== Economy ===
Most of the people's livelihoods are working in agriculture and plantation sectors and some others are traders, construction project workers, teachers and the workers working out of town

== Division of Dukuhjati Wetan Village ==
Settlement area

- Dukuhjati Wetan
- Rawa Koneng (Hamlet in Dukuhjati Wetan Village)
- Rema (Hamlet in Dukuhjati Wetan Village)

Paddy fields area

- Contoh
- Dlanggung Gunung
- Gedegan
- Gersayim
- Kalidosari Kidul
- Kalidosari Lor
- Kesang
- Kronjo
- Legok
- Lobang
- Strem Kidul
- Strem Lor
- Tipar

Hill terrain

- Geger Wedi Hill (in the southeast)

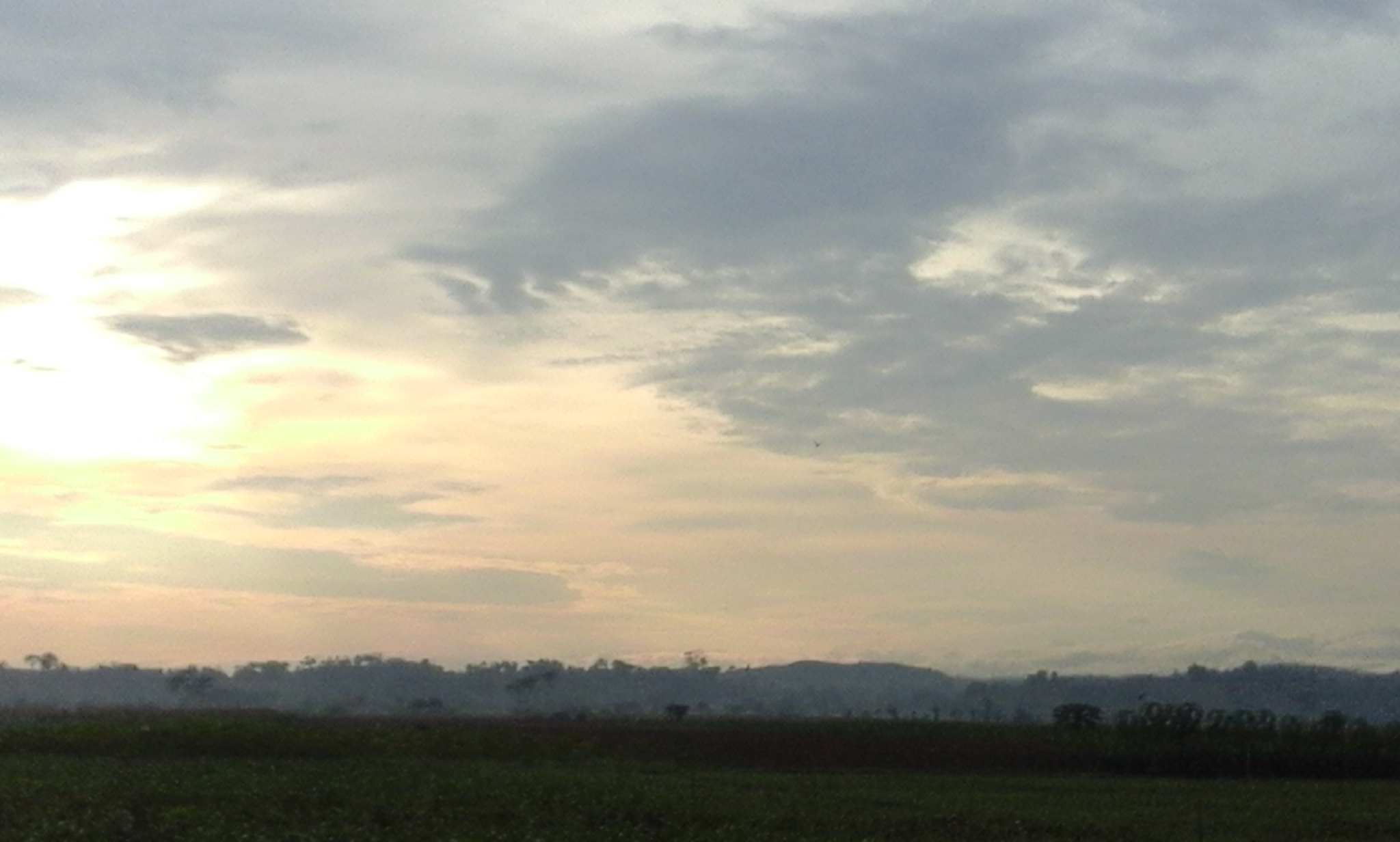
Geger Wedi Hill in the southeastern of Dukuhjati Wetan Village

== Education ==
Formal

- An Nur Play Group
  (Jl. Gatot Kaca RT 10/05)
- Masyithoh Kindergarten
  (Jl. Werkudara RT 07/04)
- Falakhuddin Islamic Kindergarten
  (Jl. Raya Simpang Tiga Utara RT 02/01)
- Dukuhjati Wetan 01 Elementary School
  (Jl. Raya Simpang Tiga RT 01/01)
- Dukuhjati Wetan 02 Elementary School
  (Jl. Raya Simpang Tiga RT 01/01)

Non formal

- MDTA Miftahul Ulum
  (Jl. Werkudara RT 07/04)
- Al Khudhoriyyah EPQ
  (Jl. Gatot Kaca RT 13/07)
- Muslimat NU EPQ
  (Jl. Werkudara RT 07/04)
- An Nur EPQ
  (Jl. Gatot Kaca RT 10/05)

P.S. EPQ (Education Park of the Qur'an)

== See also ==
- Dukuhjati Wetan Village in Indonesian Wikipedia
