= KPH =

KPH or kph may refer to:

== Healthcare ==
- Kingston Public Hospital in Jamaica

== Politics ==
- Campaign Against Homophobia (Polish: Kampania Przeciw Homofobii), LGBT support organisation in Poland
- Croatian Communist Party (Komunistička partija Hrvatske)

== Science and technology ==
- KPH (radio station), California, US
- Keystrokes per hour in data entry
- Kilometres per hour

== Geography ==
- Kesatuan Pemangku Hutan, a cultural heritage in Kedungbanteng, Indonesia

== Aviation ==
- Kazan Helicopters, ICAO airline code
- Pauloff Harbor, Alaska, US, FAA LID

== Other ==
- "Kidney, pelvic and heart fat" in marbled meat
- Kplang language of Ghana, ISO 639-3 code
- Ketapang Management District office, which manages the Ketapang Forest area
