= Brebes, Brebes, Brebes =

Brebes Kelurahan Brebes
- Administrative village
- Interactive map of Brebes
- Coordinates: 7.040°S 108.897°E
- Country: Indonesia
- Province: Central Java
- Regency: Brebes
- District: Brebes

Government
  - Lurah: Agung Setiabudi SM HK
- Time zone: UTC+07.00 (WIB)
- Postal code: 52212
- Area code: 0283

Kelurahan Brebes is an administrative village and the capital of Brebes, Brebes in Central Java, Indonesia. It is bordered by Pasarbatang to the north, Gandasuli and Limbangan Kulon to the east, Pulosari and Padasugih to the south, and Pebatan and Pesantunan to the west.
