= Besar Mertokusumo =

Indonesian independence activist (1894-1980)

Mr. Besar Mertokusumo
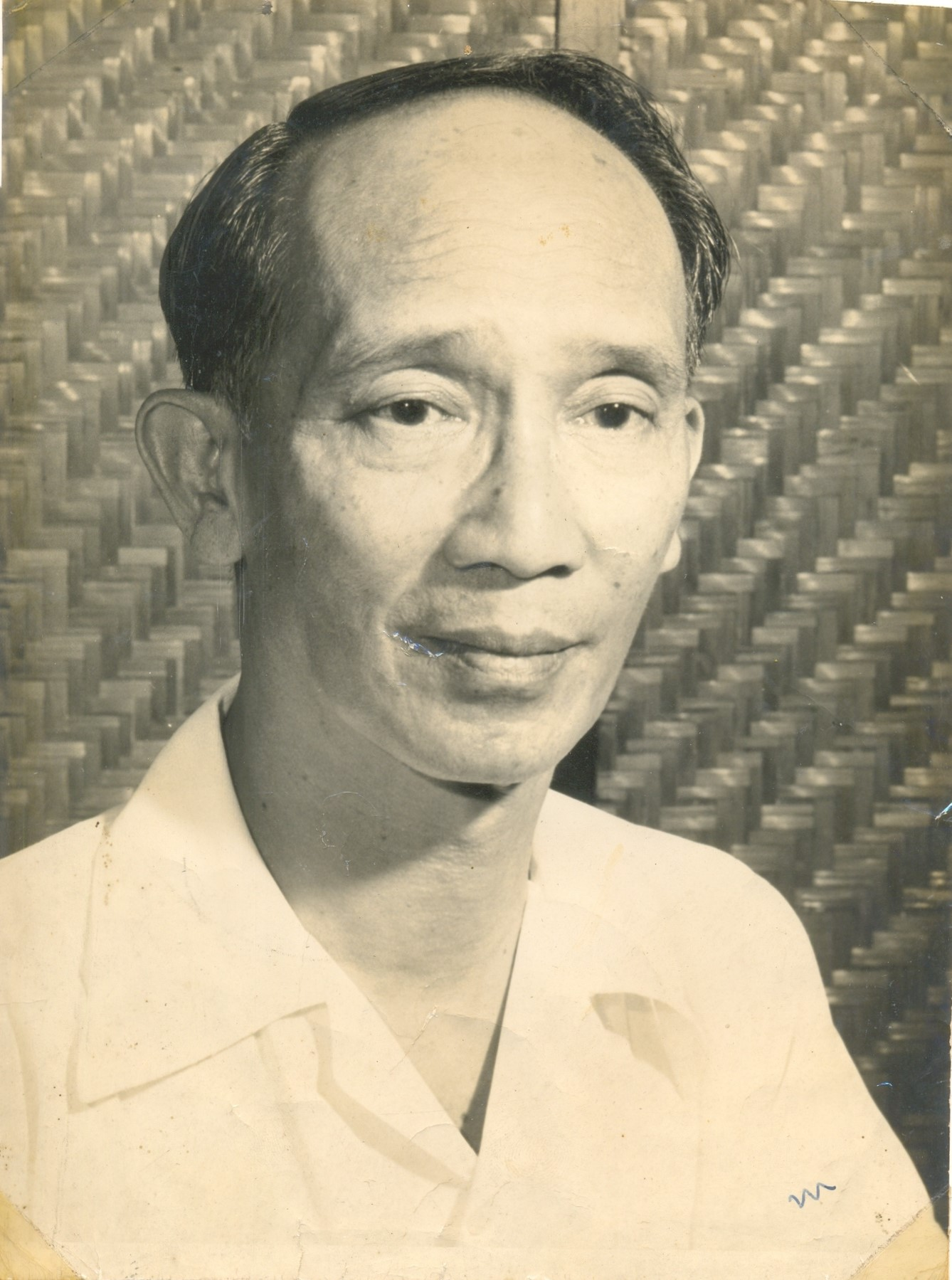
- Born: July 8, 1894; Brebes, Dutch East Indies
- Died: February 23, 1980 (aged 85)
- Resting place: Giritama Cemetery, Bogor, Indonesia
- Education: Leiden University
- Occupation: Advocate
- Spouse: Raden Ayu Majatoen
- Children: 4

Besar Mertokusumo (also spelled Besar Martokusumo; 8 July 1894 – c. 1980) was an Indonesian advocate, said by Daniel S. Lev to be the first.

== Early life and education ==
Mertokusumo was born in Brebes, Central Java, Dutch East Indies on 8 July 1894 to a prosecutor and his wife; he was the first of two children. He attended elementary school at a Europeesche Lagere School in Pekalongan, graduating in 1909. He then attended the Rechtschool in Batavia, which he graduated in 1915; there, he lived with numerous other Indonesian students under the supervision of a Dutchwoman, studying criminal law. After several years as the Official Seconded (Dutch: Ambtenaar Ter Beschikking) at the Landraad (state court) in Pekalongan, he received a grant to go to Leiden, Netherlands, to study at Leiden University together with eleven others. He graduated in 1922.

== Legal and political career ==
After being refused equal legal status with the Dutch, Mertokusumo decided to become an advocate. He later established a law firm in Tegal, not far from his family in Brebes; at the time, there were few Dutch lawyers there. Despite a lack of support from his family, after a few years he was able to open a second branch in Semarang, attracting young lawyers to his firm with wages up to 600 gulden a month.

During the Japanese occupation of the Dutch East Indies, Mertokusumo served as the mayor of Tegal in April 1942; he was the first Native Indonesian mayor. In 1944 he became the regent of Tegal Regency. Towards the end of the Japanese occupation, he joined the Committee for Preparatory Work for Indonesian Independence and became the Assistant Resident of Pekalongan.

After independence, Mertokusumo served as secretary general of the Department of Justice.

Mertokusumo died at age 86 on 23 February 1980. He is buried in Giritama Cemetery, Bogor.

== Legacy ==
American scholar of Indonesia Daniel S. Lev has called Mertokusumo Indonesia's first advocate, noting that he often represented poor Indonesian defendants in the Landraad, where they would be forced to sit on the floor. Lev writes that Mertokusumo "broke the ice" for Indonesian advocates.

On 17 August 1992, Mertokusumo received the Bintang Mahaputra posthumously for his legal work.

== Personal life ==
Mertokusumo was married to Raden Ayu Majatoen, with whom he had four children.
