= Brebes Exit =

Toll road exit

Coordinates: 6.8921°S 109.0646°E

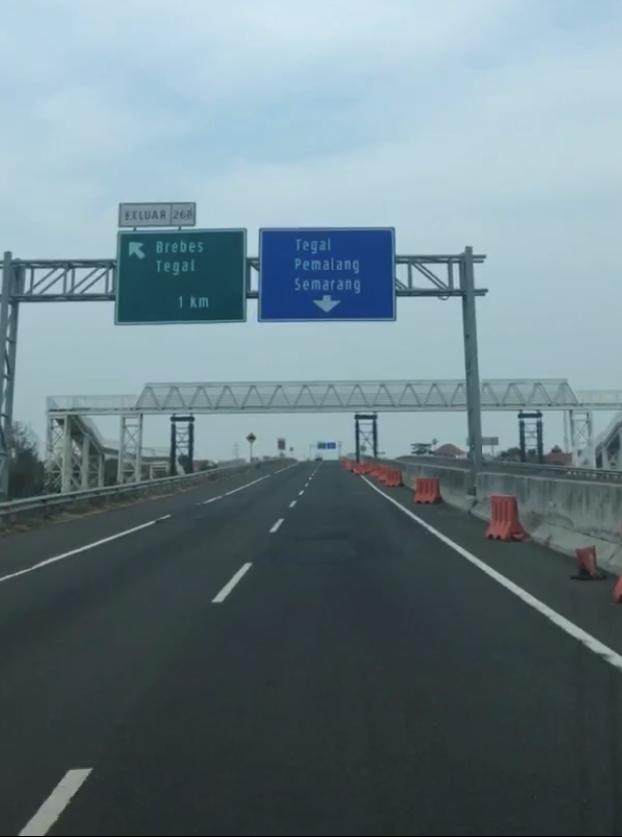
A Pejagan–Pemalang toll road sign indicating left direction to Brebes Timur exit

Brebes Timur Exit (Indonesian: Pintu Keluar Brebes Timur) is one of the most famous toll road exits in Indonesia. It is also known as Brebes Exit or Brexit, a name inspired by a UK political term to leave the European Union. It is located in Brebes Regency, Central Java on the 57.5-kilometre (35.7 mi) Pejagan–Pemalang segment, a continuation of the 35-kilometre (22 mi) Kanci–Pejagan segment of Trans-Java Toll Road network. Construction of Pejagan–Pemalang toll road began in 2014, and before 2016 mudik, the first of two sections road, Pejagan to West Brebes, and West Brebes to East Brebes, were opened.

It is infamous for multi-thousand vehicle traffic jams and deaths that occurred after opening the junction prior to the 2016 mudik or homecoming period, at the end of the month of Ramadan and at the beginning of the following month of Syawal, as some population of Jakarta left the city to return to their home village for the Muslim festival of Lebaran (Eid al-Fitr).

There are in fact two Brebes exits: Brebes Timur (East Brebes) toll booth at KM 268 (from Jakarta) and Brebes Barat (West Brebes) toll booth at KM 263. However, as Brebes Timur was the end of the Trans-Java toll road in that year, it created a massive tailback as vehicles exited the highway for onward travel.

== 2016 jams ==
During Lebaran 2016, the tailback at Brebes Exit reached 16 kilometres (9.9 mi) long. Seventeen people died on a single day.

The deaths and delays at Brexit were primarily caused by payment delays as users pay the tolls, which in 2015 totaled Rp 146.500 for the journey from Jakarta to Brexit. There was a railroad crossing and a traffic lamp-equipped junction in the access road to Java Northern Coast Road (National Route 1), making the tailback longer.

As a result of numerous vehicles running out of fuel at Brexit contributing further to delays and congestion, enterprising vendors sold fuel for upwards, of Rp 50.000/litre, more than six times of its official price. As a result, at 2017 mudik season, the state petroleum company Pertamina announced that it would set up mobile kiosks, motorbikes with fuel canisters and other facilities to provide fuel to stranded motorists.

By the end of 2017, the Indonesian government plans to eliminate cash tolls in favor of contact-less charge cards, which will greatly reduce the time taken for a vehicle to pass through toll booths.
