= Slamet =

Slamet is an Indonesian name that may refer to

Given name

- Slamet Abdul Sjukur (1935–2015), Indonesian composer
- Slamet Gundono (1966–2014), Indonesian puppeteer and artist
- Slamet Nurcahyono (born 1983), Indonesian footballer
- Slamet Rahardjo (born 1949), Indonesian actor, director, and screenwriter
- Slamet Rijadi (1927–1950), Indonesian soldier
- Slamet Riyadi (footballer) (born 1981), Indonesian footballer

Surname

- Bing Slamet (1927–1974), Indonesian singer, songwriter, comedian, and actor
- Winarni Binti Slamet (born 1975), Indonesian weightlifter

== See also ==
- Mount Slamet in Indonesia
