= Slawi =

District in Tegal Regency, Indonesia

Coordinates: 6°59′S 109°8′E

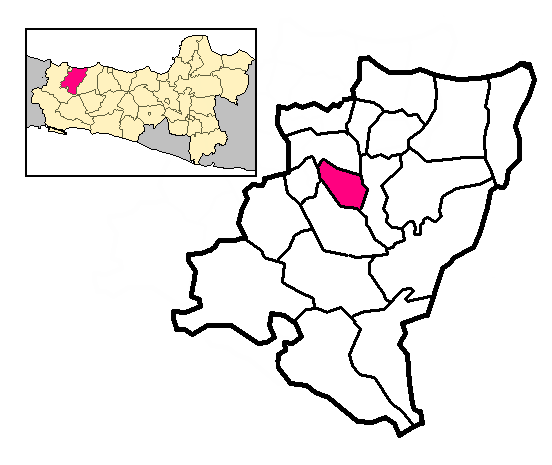
Mal of Slawi in Tegal Regency

Slawi is the administrative centre of the Tegal Regency of the province of Central Java, Indonesia. Slawi is known for the production of a particularly fragrant black tea and the tea-drinking culture known as Moci.

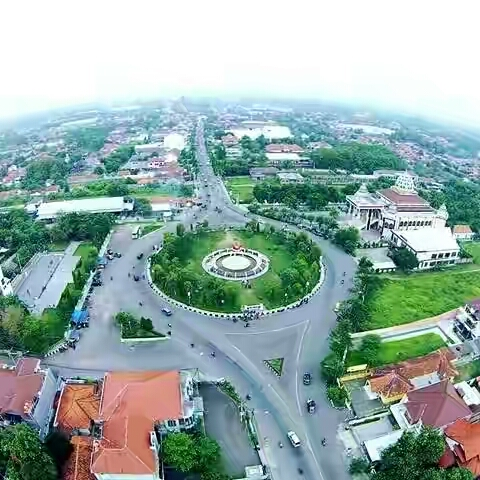
Roundabout of Slawi

== Geography ==
Unusual for a tea-producing area, Slawi has a warm climate with a gentle sloping geography.

Slawi is located about 20 km south of Tegal on the central north coast of Java in Central Java province. It is bordered by the Adiwerna (Banjaran) district to the north, the Pangkah district to the east, the Balapulang district to the south, and the Jatibarang district (located in the administrative area of Brebes Regency) to the west.

== Villages ==
Slawi District is divided into the following ten villages (five rural desa, listed first in the table below, and five urban kelurahan, listed last in the table below), tabulated below with their areas and their populations according to the mid-2023 official estimates, together with their postcodes.

Kode Wilayah	Name	Area (km^{2})	Pop'n Estimate mid 2023	Post code
33.28.10.2001	Kalisapu	3.27	14,005	52416
33.28.10.2002	Dukuhwringin	2.75	9,161	52419
33.28.10.2003	Dukuhsalam	1.10	6,746	52418
33.28.10.2004	Slawi Kulon	1.43	9,163	52419
33.28.10.2005	Trayeman	0.98	5,686	52414
33.28.10.1006	Pakembaran	1.53	9,357	52415
33.28.10.1007	Kagok	0.62	4,144	52411
33.28.10.1008	Procot	1.53	6,910	52412
33.28.10.1009	Kudaile	0.96	8,609	52413
33.28.10.1010	Slawi Wetan	1.43	8,491	52411
Totals	Slawi	15.61	82,452	

== Climate ==
Slawi has a tropical monsoon climate (Am) with moderate rainfall from June to October and heavy to very heavy rainfall from November to May.

Climate data for Slawi
Month	Jan	Feb	Mar	Apr	May	Jun	Jul	Aug	Sep	Oct	Nov	Dec	Year
Mean daily maximum °C (°F)	30.3 (86.5)	30.5 (86.9)	31.3 (88.3)	31.5 (88.7)	31.7 (89.1)	31.6 (88.9)	31.2 (88.2)	31.5 (88.7)	32.1 (89.8)	32.5 (90.5)	32.1 (89.8)	31.5 (88.7)	31.5 (88.7)
Daily mean °C (°F)	26.7 (80.1)	26.8 (80.2)	27.4 (81.3)	27.5 (81.5)	27.5 (81.5)	27.1 (80.8)	26.6 (79.9)	26.6 (79.9)	27.1 (80.8)	27.7 (81.9)	27.7 (81.9)	27.5 (81.5)	27.2 (80.9)
Mean daily minimum °C (°F)	23.2 (73.8)	23.2 (73.8)	23.5 (74.3)	23.5 (74.3)	23.4 (74.1)	22.6 (72.7)	22.1 (71.8)	21.8 (71.2)	22.2 (72.0)	23.0 (73.4)	23.4 (74.1)	23.5 (74.3)	23.0 (73.3)
Average rainfall mm (inches)	400 (15.7)	335 (13.2)	270 (10.6)	147 (5.8)	143 (5.6)	87 (3.4)	67 (2.6)	55 (2.2)	48 (1.9)	88 (3.5)	163 (6.4)	286 (11.3)	2,089 (82.2)
Source: Climate-Data.org

== Society and culture ==
The majority of citizens work as farmers, in the metal industry, the public service, or in a variety of home industries, including teak furniture-making and weaving sarongs.

As is generally the case with 'urbanisation', many young people leave the area after high school, heading for larger urban centres such as Jakarta, Bandung, and Semarang and some timber processing towns such as Banjarmasin and Balikpapan. In the last three decades, some have been working overseas in places such as the Middle East, Singapore, Malaysia, Hong Kong, and Taiwan. Their financial remittances are an important source of income for the area. The out-of-town family members would generally return to Slawi for the Moslem holidays of Idul Fitri as a tradition.

Local crafts include traditional forms of batik and metalworking, and Wayang Kulit puppet shows are also performed.

The local language of the area is Javanese, spoken with a distinctive regional accent.

The local cuisine lists among others, Tahu Aci, a fried tofu triangle with one side filled with cassava flour - represents the best vegetarian fried tofu among Asian cuisine. Sega Lengko, made of boiled and steamed rice adorned with fermented soybean cake pieces tempeh, tofu, soy-bean sprouts tauge, sand-fried peanuts, and some hand-crushed krupuk aci (cassava flour crackers), and/or krupuk udang (prawn crackers), fried shallots with mild chili peanut sauce over the top before serving. There is also a variety of chicken turmeric soup, Soto Tegal, and Sate Tegal. There are many local food stalls, called Warteg (Warung Tegal), which offer daily meals at affordable prices for all walks of life.

Tea drinking at the small or large eatery has a famous local term called Moci - literally tea drinking from one small clay teapot with one teacup for each person. It is the way to drink the locally produced fragrant jasmine black tea. The teapot is filled with a small paper bag the size of a matchbox full of jasmine tea and poured with slightly scalding hot water. The brewed tea is then poured into a clay teacup with rock sugar. The way the locals do is not to stir avoiding average sweetness, and drink while it is hot preferably with some slurping noise as well. Some will pour it on the saucer and slurp it with abandoned pleasure. The idea is to get to the last slurp or sip when it is sweetest and in this way encourage refill. It somewhat reflects the Malay pantun proverb, 'berakit-rakit ke hulu/berenang-renang ke tepian/ bersakit-sakit dahulu/bersenang-senang kemudian', meaning there is a satisfying end to a difficult beginning. Not to be mistaken with the way the Russians drink their tea, by holding the rock sugar between their teeth and sipping the tea.

Moci is frequently accompanied by Mendoan, a moist fermented soybean cake (tempe or tempeh) fried in wheat flour batter, often eaten with sambal ulek (oelek) or plain chilli paste or simply bite into one bird's eye chilli then bite a piece of the tempe. This is a favourite drink while enjoying the famous Sate Tegal, a sate of local goat meat.

== Local areas of interest ==
There are several beaches within easy reach of Slawi, as well as Guci, an area of waterfalls, gardens, and public hot springs at the foot of Slamet Mountain, approximately 27 km south of Slawi. In addition, nearby Alun Alun Kabupaten Slawi is a garden with a large fountain that is popular on Sundays.

In the town itself, there are the old and new markets, the Singa and Rama theatres, as well as the historical Pankah Sugar Factory, and the 4th Slawi Primary School, both of which are part of the Dutch colonial legacy in the city.

== Notable residents ==
- Slamet Gundono (1966–2014) Wayang puppeteer and artist
- Tan Hong Boen (1905–82) writer and businessman
- Imelda Wiguna (b. 1951) badminton player
