= Purbaya Polytechnic Institute =

- Politeknik Purbaya
- Motto: Dare to be different
- Type: Private
- Established: September 23, 2002
- Academic affiliations: Asosiasi Perguruan Tinggi Swasta Indonesia (APTISI)
- Director: TBD
- Academic staff: 6
- Administrative staff: 4
- Students: 200
- Other students: 49 vocational education
- Location: Tegal Regency, Central Java, Indonesia
- Colors: Green and yellow
- Nickname: Purbaya
- Website: purbaya.ac.id

Purbaya Polytechnic Institute, officially Politeknik Purbaya, is a private coeducational vocational education institution located in Tegal Regency, Central Java Province, Indonesia. It is the first technical higher education institution in the regency. Its campus is situated at Jalan Pancakarya No. 1 Talang. The polytechnic is operated autonomously under patronage of Yayasan Pertiwi di Tegal (The Pertiwi in Tegal Foundation).

Purbaya was established in 2002 by Mr H. Soediarto, the Regent of Tegal at the time and his wife Mrs. Hj. Sri Adiyati Soediarto. It was named after Raden Purbayasa, the first Regent of Tegal. The polytechnic's operating permit was issued by Ministry of National Education (now Ministry of Research, Technology and Higher Education) with Minister Decree No. 208/D/O/2002.

The polytechnic currently offers three-year vocational education in Mechanical Engineering and Information Systems.

== Study Programs ==
The Purbayatech offers three-years vocational education in:

- Mechanical engineering with a focus in mechanical systems design
- Information systems with a focus in free/open-source software based Information systems

== General ==
Tegal Regency has a reputation as a center of plate metalworking home industries in Indonesia.
