= Songgom, Brebes =

Administrative district in Indonesia

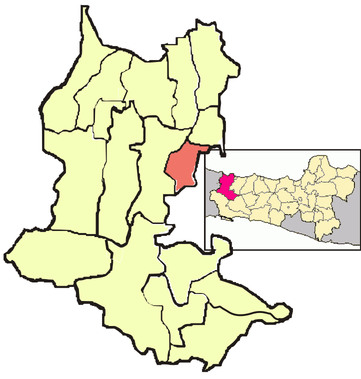
Location in Brebes Regency

Songgom District is the name of an administrative district (Indonesian: Kecamatan) in Brebes Regency, Central Java, Indonesia. It covers 52.65 km^{2} and had a population of 68,374 at the 2010 Census and 85,122 at the 2020 Census.
