= Bulakamba, Brebes =

District in Central Java Province, Indonesia

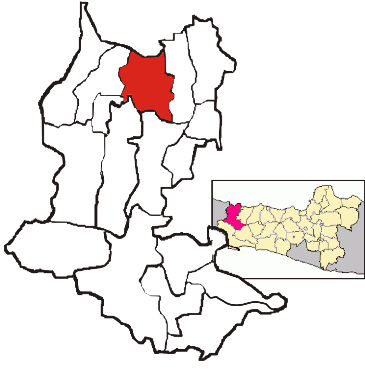
Location in Brebes Regency

Bulakamba District is the name of an administrative district (Indonesian: Kecamatan) in Brebes Regency, Central Java, Indonesia. It covers 120.36 km^{2} and had a population of 162,478 at the 2010 Census and 181,758 at the 2020 Census.
