= Slamet Gundono =

Indonesian puppeteer (1966– 2014)

Slamet Gundono (June 19, 1966 – January 5, 2014) was an Indonesian modern puppeteer in Wayang and artist. He was born in Slawi, the capital of the Tegal Regency, and died in 2014.

Traditionally, wayang is linked with drinking and debauchery, which initially was a reason for Gundono not to feel attached to this kind of shadow theater. During his study at a madrassa in Lebaksiu though, his interest was rekindled, and in 1997 he staged his first grass puppet show in Riau.

In 1999 he finished his study in Puppetry at the Art Academy (STSI) in Surakarta, also known as Solo, which is called Institute Seni Indonesia (ISI) nowadays. The same year he founded his theater company in Surakarta, called Sanggar Wayang Suket, which translates: as Grass Puppet Studio. Here he developed the wayang puppetry that had not developed in the country for a long time.

Within several years, the artist with a weight of 150 kg grew to be an icon in the wayang suket (grass puppet). In the meantime, Gundono staged worldwide and received several prizes, among which was a Prince Claus Award from the Netherlands in 2005.

== Puppet choreography ==
Gundono (re)wrote several pieces for puppet theater. The following list is a selection:

- Sukesi atau Rahwana Lahir (The Birth of Rahwana)
- Limbuk Ingin Merdeka (Limbuk want Freedom)
- Bibir Merah Banowati (Banowati's Rosy Lips)
