= Larangan, Tangerang =

Larangan
- Town and district
- Interactive map of Larangan
- Country: Indonesia
- Province: Banten
- Municipality: Tangerang City

Area
  - Total: 9.40 km^{2} (3.63 sq mi)

Population (mid 2023 estimate)
  - Total: 151,860
  - Density: 16,200/km^{2} (41,800/sq mi)

Larangan is a town and an administrative district (kecamatan) of Tangerang City, in Banten Province of Indonesia, on the island of Java (not to be confused with other districts of the same name in Brebes Regency and Pamekasan Regency). The district covers an area of 9.40 km^{2}, and had a population of 163,901 at the 2010 Census and 165,599 at the 2020 Census; the official estimate as at mid 2023 was 151,860.

== Communities ==
Larangan District is sub-divided into eight urban communities (kelurahan), listed below with their areas and their officially-estimated populations as at mid 2022, together with their postcodes.

Kode Wilayah	Name of kelurahan	Area in km^{2}	Population mid 2022 estimate	Post code
36.71.13.1001	Larangan Utara (North Larangan)	1.26	23,887	15154
36.71.13.1002	Larangan Selatan (South Larangan)	0.95	19,852	15154
36.71.13.1003	Cipadu	1.36	19,804	15155
36.71.13.1004	Kreo	1.19	14,792	15156
36.71.13.1005	Larangan Indah	1.06	14,547	15154
36.71.13.1006	Gaga	1.19	23,748	15154
36.71.13.1007	Cipadu Jaya	1.09	16,864	15155
36.71.13.1008	Kreo Selatan	1.31	16,910	15156
36.71.13	Totals	9.41	150,404 ^{(a)}	

Notes: (a) comprising 75,070 males and 75,334 females.
