= Brebes (town) =

Brebes District Kecamatan Brebes
- District
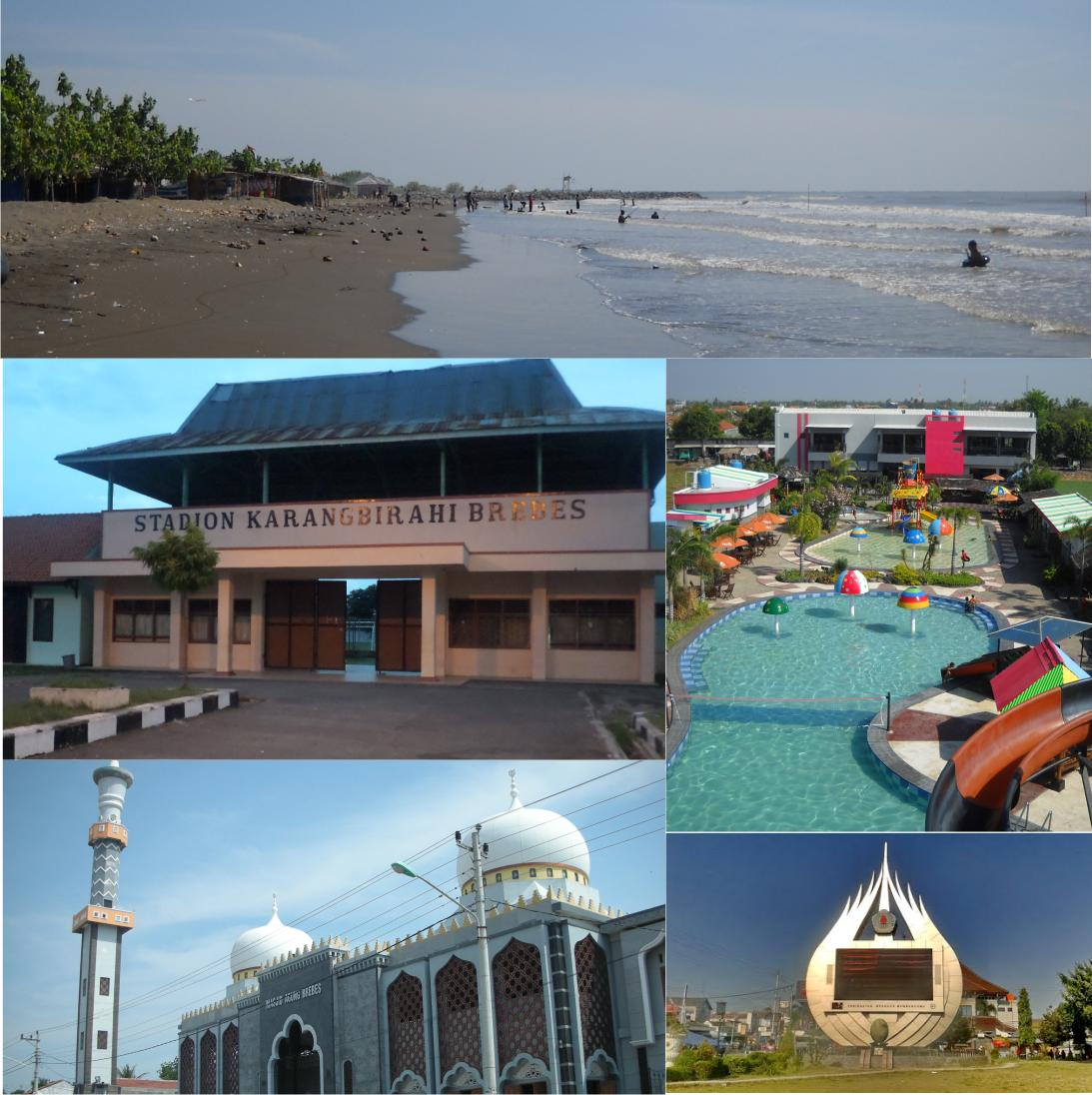
- Sights in Brebes (clockwise from top) : Randusanga Beach, Ciblon Waterboom, Alun alun Brebes, Great Mosque of Brebes, Karangbirahi Stadium

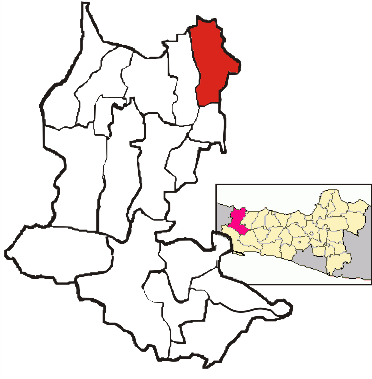
- Location Brebes District in Brebes Regency
- Coordinates: 6°52′30″S 109°03′10″E
- Country: Indonesia
- Province: Central Java
- Regency: Brebes

Government
  - Camat: M. Amrin Alfi Umar, S.IP, M.Si

Area
  - Total: 92.23 km^{2} (35.61 sq mi)

Population (end 2023 estimate)
  - Total: 189,721
  - Density: 2,057/km^{2} (5,328/sq mi)
- Time zone: UTC+07.00 (WIB)
- Postal Code: 52211 to 52219
- Area code: 0283

Brebes District is an administrative district (Indonesian: Kecamatan) containing the capital of Brebes Regency, in Central Java Province of Indonesia. It is bordered by the Java Sea to the north (the coastal desa of Randusanga Kulon including the lower reaches and mouth of the Pemali River), by Tegal City (West Tegal District and Margadana District) and Tegal Regency (Dukuhturi District and Adiwerna District) to the east, by Jatibarang District to the south and by Wanasari District to the west. It covers 92.23 km^{2} and had a population of 157,149 at the 2010 Census and 182,421 at the 2020 Census; the official estimate as at end 2023 was 189,721.

== History ==
In early January 1950, ADI/TII forces led by Amir Fatah briefly occupied Brebes. Later, they retreated from the town after facing a battle from the Indonesian National Armed Forces (TNI).

== Administrative Villages ==
Brebes District is divided into the following twenty-three villages (five which have the status of urban kelurahan and are indicated by asterisks below, and eighteen rural desa), tabulated below with their areas and their populations according to the end-2023 official estimates, together with their postcodes.

Kode Wilayah	Name	Area (km^{2})	Pop'n Estimate end 2023	Post code
33.29.09.2001	Banjaranyar	2.03	7,598	52216
33.29.09.1002	Brebes (town) *	3.26	22,079	52212
33.29.09.1003	Gandasuli *	1.14	9,192	52215
33.29.09.2004	Kaligangsa Kulon	2.81	9,085	52217
33.29.09.2005	Kaligangsa Wetan	2.44	6,956	52217
33.29.09.2006	Kalimati	2.29	3,007	52219
33.29.09.2007	Kaliwlingi	24.72	9,076	52219
33.29.09.2008	Kedunguter	3.59	8,550	52219
33.29.09.2009	Krasak	1.73	7,001	52219
33.29.09.2010	Lembarawa	2.58	6,152	52219
33.29.09.1011	Limbangan Kulon *	1.97	4,487	52219
33.29.09.1012	Limbangan Wetan *	3.89	9,895	52218
33.29.09.2013	Padasugih	1.51	6,723	52214
33.29.09.2014	Pagejugan	4.36	11,481	52219
33.29.09.1015	Pasarbatang *	4.61	22,509	52211
33.29.09.2016	Pemaron	2.11	6,280	52219
33.29.09.2017	Pulosari	2.29	7,798	52213
33.29.09.2018	Randusanga Kulon	13.01	8,003	52219
33.29.09.2019	Randusanga Wetan	6.21	2,354	52219
33.29.09.2020	Sigambir	0.95	4,187	52219
33.29.09.2021	Tengki	1.40	6,941	52219
33.29.09.2022	Terlangu	1.76	5,518	52219
33.29.09.2023	Wangandalem	1.57	4,849	52214
Totals	Brebes District	92.23	189,721	
