= Bantarkawung, Brebes =

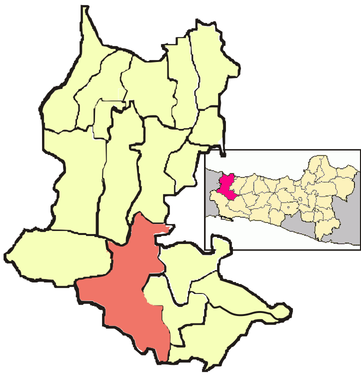
Location in Brebes Regency

Bantarkawung District is the name of an administrative district (Indonesian: Kecamatan) in Brebes Regency, Central Java, Indonesia. It covers 208.18 km^{2} (making it the largest district within the Regency) and had a population of 87,537 at the 2010 Census and 102,815 at the 2020 Census.
