= Losari, Brebes =

District in Central Java, Indonesia

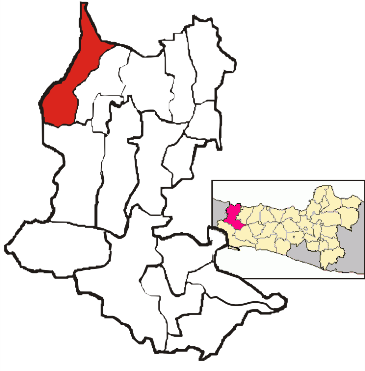
Location in Brebes Regency

Losari District is the name of an administrative district (Indonesian: Kecamatan) in Brebes Regency, Central Java, Indonesia. It covers 91.79 km^{2} and had a population of 120,363 at the 2010 Census and 138,582 at the 2020 Census.
