= Salem, Brebes =

District in Brebes Regency, Central Java Province, Indonesia

Coordinates: 7.1605°S 108.7886°E

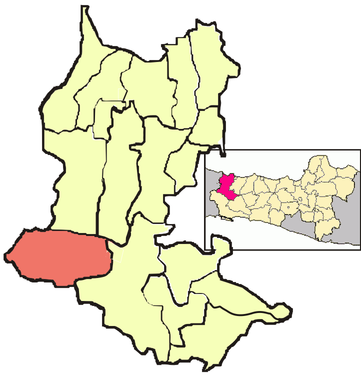
Location in Brebes Regency

Salem District (Sundanese: ᮊᮎᮙᮒᮔ᮪ ᮞᮜᮨᮙ᮪ Kacamatan Salem) is the name of an administrative district (Indonesian: Kecamatan) in Brebes Regency, Central Java, Indonesia. It covers 167.21 km^{2} and had a population of 56,871 at the 2010 Census and 63,462 at the 2020 Census. It borders Sindangheula, Brebes to the north.
