= Kedungbanteng, Tegal =

Kedungbanteng District Kecamatan Kedungbanteng
- Village and District
- Etymology: Bull River
- Nickname: Kedungbanteng
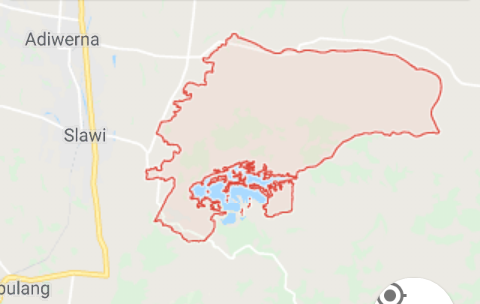

- Kedungbanteng in Java Island, ID
- Coordinates: 6°58′31″S 109°12′59″E
- Country: Indonesia
- Province: Central Java
- City/ Regency: Tegal
- Number of Villages: 10

Government
  - Camat: Drs. Imam Maskur MSI

Area
  - Total: 82.75 km^{2} (31.95 sq mi)
- Elevation: 65 m (213 ft)

Population
  - Total: 48,737
  - Density: 589.0/km^{2} (1,525/sq mi)
- Time zone: UTC+7 (Indonesia Western Time)
- Postcode: 52472

Kedungbanteng is a village (desa) and an administrative district (kecamatan) located in the eastern part of Tegal Regency, in Central Java Province of Indonesia (not to be confused with the district of the same name in nearby Banyumas Regency). The district covers a land area of 82.75 km^{2}, and had a population of 48,737 (24,635 males and 24,102 females) according to the official estimates for mid 2023. The headquarters of the district (the village of Kedungbanteng) is 8 km drive from the centre of the regency, which is in Slawi Town (through the south of Pangkah District).

== Villages ==
Kedungbanteng District is divided into the following ten villages (desa), listed below with their areas and their populations according to the mid-2023 official estimates.

| Kode Wilayah | Name | Area (km^{2}) | Pop'n Estimate mid 2023 |
|---|---|---|---|
| 33.28.08.2001 | Penujah | 5.37 | 2,395 |
| 33.28.08.2002 | Karanganyar | 3.52 | 9,144 |
| 33.28.08.2003 | Tonggara | 16.08 | 5,538 |
| 33.28.08.2004 | Kedungbanteng | 13.87 | 7,625 |
| 33.28.08.2005 | Dukuhjati Wetan | 2.32 | 2,736 |
| 33.28.08.2006 | Sumingkir | 1.76 | 3,383 |
| 33.28.08.2007 | Margamulya | 2.62 | 3,796 |
| 33.28.08.2008 | Kebandingan | 2.15 | 5,961 |
| 33.28.08.2009 | Karangmalang | 16.53 | 5,108 |
| 33.28.08.2010 | Semedo | 18.53 | 3,051 |
| Totals | Kedungbanteng | 28.75 | 48,737 |

== Boundaries ==
The boundaries of Kedungbanteng District are as follows :

| North | Suradadi District and Warureja District |
| South | Pangkah District and Jatinegara District |
| West | Tarub District and Pangkah District |
| East | Warureja District |

== Tourism ==
- Cacaban Lake

Cacaban Lake is one of the tourist attractions in the form of a reservoir or dam in Penujah village, which also serves to irrigate the surrounding fields. At the tourist sites Tirta Reservoir Cacaban there are a few floating stalls selling a variety of fresh water fish dishes.

- Archaeological Site of Semedo

The Semedo site is in the village of Semedo. The cultural heritage that spans the area of the Perhutani of the Forest Stakeholders Unity (Indonesian : Kesatuan Pemangku Hutan or "KPH") Pemalang was discovered in 2005. At least three important fossils from the Semedo Site are considered to have opened new horizons for prehistoric research. The discoverer of the Semedo site was Mr. Dakri, a villager of Semedo who began collecting fossils from Semedo hill (148 m, coordinates 6°57′30″S 109°16′55″E) since 2003. The fossils are lying in full view on the ground, without any digging process required. He collected the fossils one by one and kept them in his house. So his home became a simple museum for the fossils of Semedo. Animals such as Mastodon sp. (ancient elephant), Stegodon sp. (ancient elephant), Elephas sp. (ancient elephant), Rhinoceros sp. (rhinoceros), Hippopotamus sp. (hippopotamus), Cervidas (deer species), Suidae (pig species), Bovidae (cow, buffalo, bull), etc. They once lived between 1.2 - 0.4 million years ago in Semedo. Here there are also found ancient human skull fragments of Homo erectus which opened a new horizon about the spread of Homo erectus in Java, according to researchers from the expert team of Conservation Hall of Ancient Human Site Sangiran. The fossil was about 700,000 years old, from the time of the middle Pleistocene. In addition to fossils, there are chopping tools, flakes, scrappers, and debris. The type of stone used for tools includes chert, silicified limestone and chalceneony.
