= Jatibarang Lor =

Village in Brebes Regency, Central Java, Indonesia

Coordinates: 6°57′51.34″S 109°3′32.28″E

- Village
- Interactive map of Jatibarang Lor
- Country: Indonesia
- Province: Central Java
- Regency: Brebes
- District: Jatibarang
- Postal code: 52261

Jatibarang Lor (Indonesian pronunciation: [d͡ʒat̪iˌbaraŋ ˈlɔr]) is a village in Jatibarang District of Brebes Regency, Central Java, Indonesia.
