= Sirampog, Brebes =

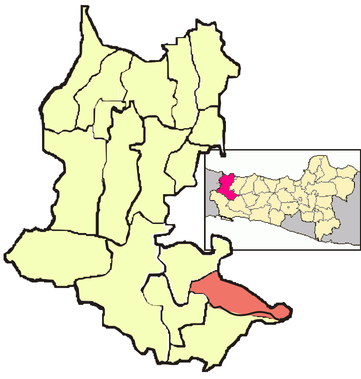
Location in Brebes Regency

Sirampog District is the name of an administrative district (Indonesian: Kecamatan) in Brebes Regency, Central Java, Indonesia. It covers 74.19 km^{2} and had a population of 61,687 at the 2010 Census and 69,901 at the 2020 Census.
