= Tonjong, Brebes =

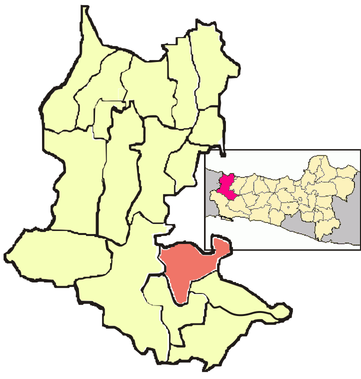
Location in Brebes Regency

Tonjong District is the name of an administrative district (Indonesian: Kecamatan) in Brebes Regency, Central Java, Indonesia. It covers 86.55 km^{2} and had a population of 65,232 at the 2010 Census and 76,477 at the 2020 Census.
