= Paguyangan, Brebes =

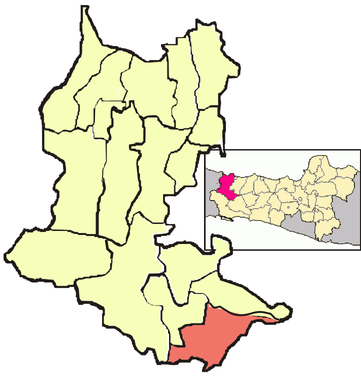
Location in Brebes Regency

Paguyangan District is the name of an administrative district (Indonesian: Kecamatan) in Brebes Regency, Central Java, Indonesia. It covers 108.17 km^{2} and had a population of 96,268 at the 2010 Census and 112,174 at the 2020 Census.
