= Tanjung, Brebes =

District in Brebes Regency, Central Java Province, Indonesia

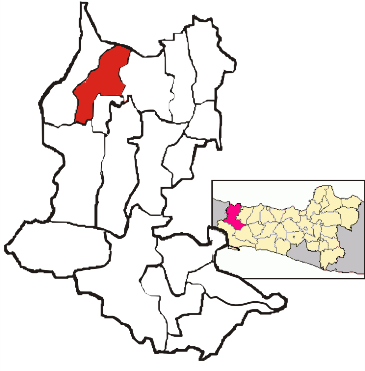
Location in Brebes Regency

Tanjung District is the name of an administrative district (Indonesian: Kecamatan) in Brebes Regency, Central Java, Indonesia. It covers 72.09 km^{2} and had a population of 91,660 at the 2010 Census and 105,155 at the 2020 Census.
