= Wanasari, Brebes =

Administrative district in Brebes, Central Java, Indonesia

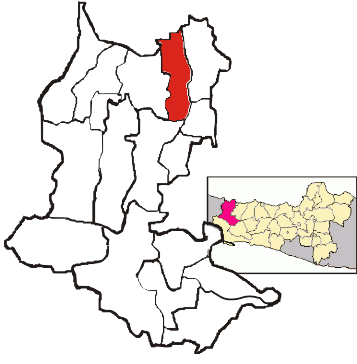
Location in Brebes Regency

Wanasari District is an administrative district (Indonesian: Kecamatan) in Brebes Regency, Central Java, Indonesia. It covers 74.63 km^{2} and had a population of 140,663 at the 2010 Census and 161,893 at the 2020 Census; the official estimate as at the end of 2023 was 168,524.

== Administrative Villages ==
Wanasari District is divided into the following twenty villages (all which have the status of rural desa), tabulated below with their areas and their populations according to the end-2023 official estimates, together with their postcodes.

Kode Wilayah	Name	Area (km^{2})	Pop'n Estimate end 2023	Post code
33.29.08.2001	Glonggong	2.49	5,421	52252
33.29.08.2002	Dukuhwringin	2.30	5,961	52252
33.29.08.2003	Dumeling	1.99	9,625	52252
33.29.08.2004	Jagalempeni	4.95	11,020	52252
33.29.08.2005	Keboledan	1.51	8,170	52252
33.29.08.2006	Kertabesuki	2.16	5,968	52252
33.29.08.2007	Klampok	4.18	17,116	52252
33.29.08.2008	Kupu	2.75	9,590	52252
33.29.08.2009	Lengkong	1.44	4,303	52252
33.29.08.2010	Pebatan	2.24	6,335	52222
33.29.08.2011	Pesantunan	2.79	17,420	52221
33.29.08.2012	Sawojajar	19.87	13,013	52252
33.29.08.2013	Siasem	6.04	6,723	52252
33.29.08.2014	Sidamulya	3.27	6,439	52252
33.29.08.2015	Sigentong	2.51	9,456	52252
33.29.08.2016	Sisalam	1.97	11,938	52252
33.29.08.2017	Siwungkuk	1.14	3,741	52252
33.29.08.2018	Tanjungsari	5.47	6,126	52252
33.29.08.2019	Tegalgandu	2.50	7,391	52252
33.29.08.2020	Wanasari (town)	3.05	6,065	52252
Totals	Wanasari District	74.63	168,524	
