= Larangan, Brebes =

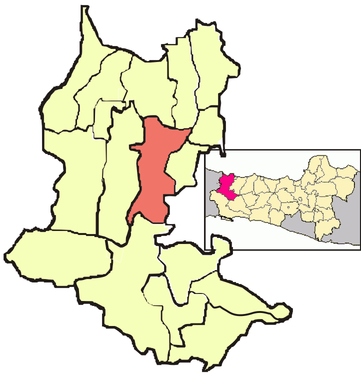
Location in Brebes Regency

Larangan District is the name of an administrative district (Indonesian: Kecamatan) in Brebes Regency, Central Java, Indonesia. It covers 160.25 km^{2} and had a population of 136,825 at the 2010 Census and 157,505 at the 2020 Census.
