= Ketanggungan, Brebes =

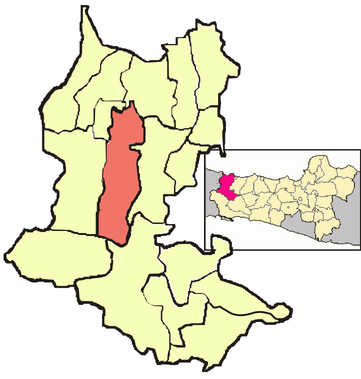
Location in Brebes Regency

Ketanggungan District is the name of an administrative district (Indonesian: Kecamatan) in Brebes Regency, Central Java, Indonesia. It covers 153.41 km^{2} and had a population of 133,770 at the 2010 Census and 144,524 at the 2020 Census.
