= Banjarharjo, Brebes =

Coordinates: 7.0213°S 108.82°E

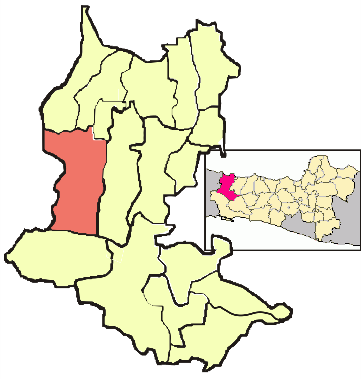
Location in Brebes Regency

Banjarharjo District is the name of an administrative district (Indonesian: Kecamatan) in Brebes Regency, Central Java, Indonesia. It covers 161.75 km^{2} and had a population of 118,070 at the 2010 Census and 129,783 at the 2020 Census.
