= Tegal Regency =

Regency in Central Java, Indonesia

Tegal Regency Kabupaten Tegal
- Regency

Other transcription(s)
  - Javanese: ꦏꦧꦸꦥꦠꦺꦤ꧀ꦠꦺꦒꦭ꧀
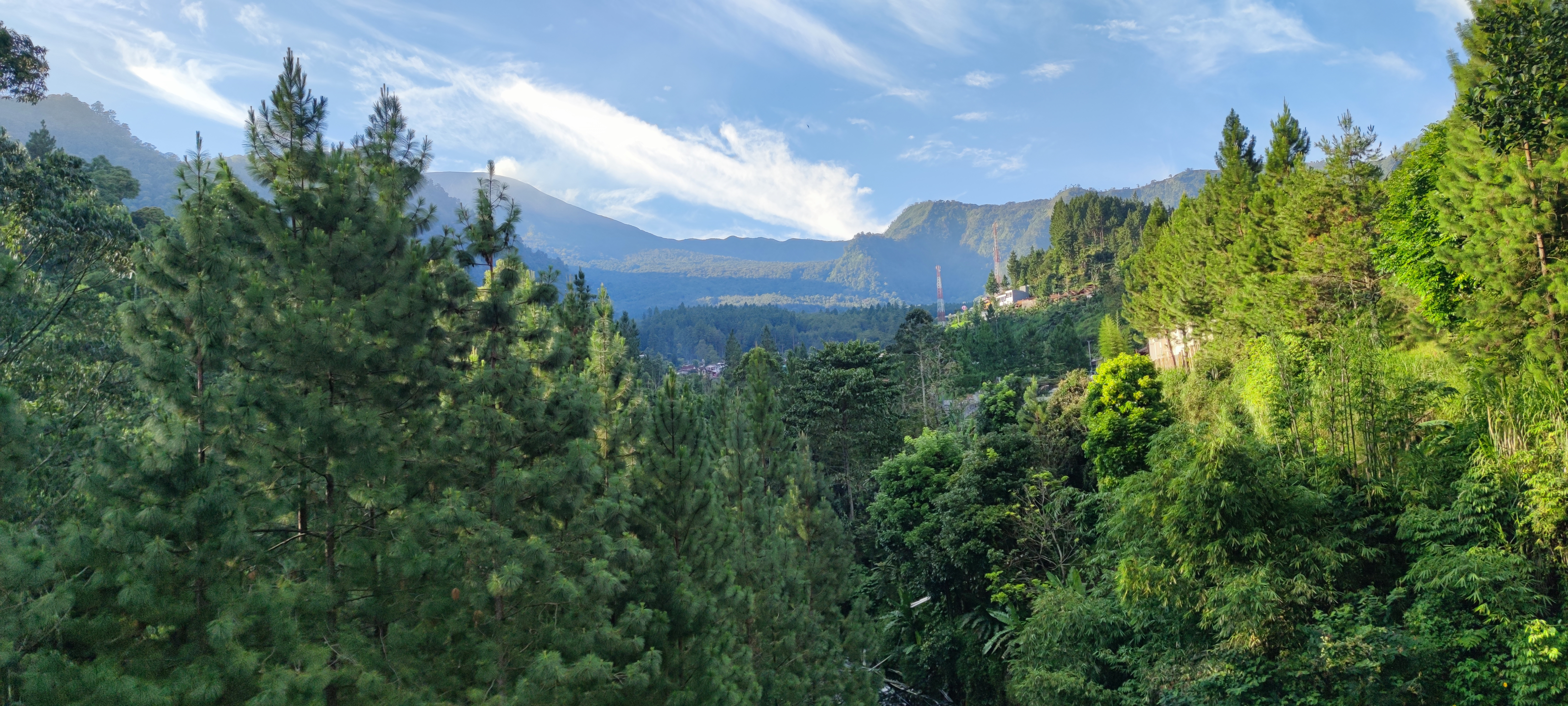
- Guci forest park

- Coat of arms
- Nickname: Tegal Hadiningrat
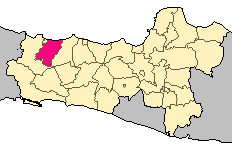
- Location within Central Java

- Location in Java and Indonesia Tegal Regency (Indonesia)
- Coordinates: 06°57′56″S 109°10′45″E
- Country: Indonesia
- Province: Central Java
- Settled: May 18, 1601
- Founder: Ki Gede Sebayu
- Named for: Teteguall Land
- Capital: Slawi

Government
  - Body: Tegal Regency Government
  - Regent: Ischak Maulana Rohman
  - Vice Regent: Ahmad Kholid

Area
  - Total: 983.9 km^{2} (379.9 sq mi)
  - Rank: 21st in Central Java

Population (mid 2025 estimate)
  - Total: 1,694,235
  - Rank
  - Density: 1,722/km^{2} (4,460/sq mi)
- Demonym: Tegalese

Demographics
  - Ethnic groups: Javanese (98%); Chinese (2%)
  - Languages: Tegalese; Javanese; Indonesian
- Time zone: UTC+7 (Indonesia Western Time)
- Area code: (+62) 283
- ISO 3166 code: ID-SLW
- Vehicle registration: G
- Largest district by area: Jatinegara - 109.5 square kilometres (42.3 sq mi)
- Largest district by population: Adiwerna - (134,556 in mid 2024)
- Districts: 18
- Rural Villages; Urban Villages: 281; 6
- Website: tegalkab.go.id

Tegal Regency (Javanese:ꦏꦧꦸꦥꦠꦺꦤ꧀ꦠꦺꦒꦭ꧀) is one of the regencies (kabupaten) in the northwest corner of Central Java province of Indonesia, with an area of 983.9 km^{2} (379.9 sq mi). The regency's administrative center used to be in Tegal City, in the northwest corner of the regency, but then Tegal City was administratively separated from the regency and created as an independent municipality. The city was later replaced as the administrative centre of Tegal Regency by Slawi Town, which is a suburb about 20 km (12 mi) to the south of the city and within the regency boundary. The regency had a population of 1,394,839 at the 2010 Census and 1,596,996 at the 2020 Census; the official estimate as at mid 2025 was 1,694,235 (comprising 858,205 males and 836,030 females).

== History ==
The name of Tegal comes from the word Tetegal which means fertile soil capable of producing agricultural crops. Another source states that Tegal's name is believed to come from the word Teteguall - the name given by a trader from Portugal named Tome Pires who stopped at the Port of Tegal in the 1500s.

Tegal Regency was established on 18 May 1601 when Ki Gede Sebayu was appointed as a Juru Demung in Tegal by the Sultan of Mataram, and began to develop this area.

== Geography ==
The northern (coastal) part of Tegal Regency is lowland, while in the southern part is a mountain, Mount Slamet, rising to a peak of 3,428 m. At the border with Pemalang Regency, there are a series of steep hills down which large rivers flow, namely Kali Gung and Kali Erang, both of which have their sources near Mount Slamet.

=== Geographic location ===
Tegal Regency is located in the northwest part of Central Java province, with geographical location 108° 57 ' 06" - 109° 21' 30" E and 6° 02' 41" - 7° 15' 30" S. Tegal Regency has a strategic location, as it is situated on the roads from Semarang - Tegal - Cirebon and from Semarang - Tegal - Purwokerto - Cilacap, with port facilities located in Tegal City.

=== Boundaries ===
Tegal Regency is bordered to the north by the Java Sea, to the east by Pemalang Regency, to the south by Banyumas Regency and Brebes Regency, to the west by Brebes Regency, and to the northwest by the city of Tegal.

== Administrative division ==
Administratively, Tegal Regency is divided into 18 districts (kecamatan), which are sub-divided into administrative villages - 281 rural villages (desa) and 6 urban villages (kelurahan). The districts are listed below with their areas and their populations at the 2010 Census and the 2020 Census, together with the official estimates as at mid 2025. The table also includes the locations of the district administrative centres, and the number of administrative villages in each district (totaling 281 rural desa and 6 urban kelurahan).

Kode Wilayah	Name of District (kecamatan)	Area in km^{2}	Pop'n Census 2010	Pop'n Census 2020	Pop'n Estimate mid 2025	No. of villages	Admin centre
33.28.01	Margasari	100.8	94,405	109,408	116,734	13	Margasari
33.28.02	Bumijawa	109.2	83,286	96,686	103,245	18	Bumijawa
33.28.03	Bojong	67.7	61,192	73,393	79,619	17	Bojong
33.28.04	Balapulang	86.2	80,847	92,690	98,382	20	Balapulang
33.28.05	Pagerbarang	45.8	51,931	62,170	67,383	13	Paperbarang
33.28.06	Lebaksiu	47.0	82,831	93,825	99,006	15	Lebaksiu Lor
33.28.07	Jatinegara	109.5	53,411	60,010	63,075	17	Jatinegara
33.28.08	Kedungbanteng	82.7	39,900	44,795	47,067	10	Kedungbanteng
33.28.09	Pangkah	37.6	98,652	114,166	121,726	23	Pangkah
33.28.10	Slawi (town)	13.8	68,745	78,883	83,762	10 ^{(a)}	Slawi Wetan
33.28.18	Dukuhwaru	26.3	58,015	68,349	73,508	10	Dukuhwaru
33.28.11	Adiwerna	27.0	118,153	130,224	135,609	21	Adiwerna
33.28.13	Dukuhturi	17.1	87,840	99,888	105,603	18	Dukuhturi
33.28.12	Talang	18.9	96,400	107,148	112,034	19	Talang
33.28.14	Tarub	28.0	75,924	85,932	90,642	20	Mindaka
33.28.15	Kramat	43.9	103,285	118,807	125,304	20 ^{(b)}	Kramat
33.28.16	Suradadi	58.8	80,534	93,201	99,374	11	Suradadi
33.28.17	Warureja	63.6	59,488	67,420	71,162	12	Warureja
	Totals	983.9	1,394,839	1,596,996	1,694,235	287	Slawi

Notes: (a) comprising 5 kelurahan (Kagok, Kudaile, Pakembaran, Procot and Slawi Wetan) and 5 desa. (b) including one kelurahan (Dampyak).

The nine districts of Lebaksiu, Pangkah, Slawi, Dukuhwaru, Adiwerna, Dukuhturi, Talang, Tarub and Kramat are part of the Tegal Metropolitan Area; of these, Adiwerna, Dukuhturi and Talang are southern suburbs of Tegal City. with over 350,000 residents between them (more than the population of Tegal City itself).

From its establishment, the administrative center of Tegal Regency was located in Tegal City. However, following the issuance of Government Regulation No. 2/1984, its administrative centre was moved from the Tegal City area to the town of Slawi. Beginning in late 1989, Slawi was developed into the capital of Tegal Regency.
The districts and villages (rural desa and urban kelurahan) in Tegal Regency are:

District	Postcode	Rural Villages (desa) / Urban Villages (kelurahan)
Adiwerna	52121	Kalimati
Adiwerna	52194	Adiwerna · Bersole · Gumalar · Harjosari Kidul · Harjosari Lor · Kaliwadas · Kedungsukun · Lemahduwur · Lumingser · Pagedangan · Pagiyanten · Pecangakan · Pedeslohor · Penarukan · Pesarean · Tembok Banjaran · Tembok Kidul · Tembok Lor · Tembok Luwung · Ujungrusi
Balapulang	52464	Balapulang Kulon · Balapulang Wetan · Banjaranyar · Batuagung · Bukateja · Cenggini · Cibunar · Cilongok · Danareja · Danawarih · Harjawinangun · Kalibakung · Kaliwungu · Karangjambu · Pagerwangi · Pamiritan · Sangkanjaya · Sesepan · Tembongwah · Wringin Jenggot
Bojong	52465	Batunyana · Bojong · Buniwah · Cikura · Danasari · Dukuhtengah · Gunungjati · Kajenengan · Kalijambu · Karangmulyo · Kedawung · Lengkong · Pucang Luwuk · Rembul · Sangkanayu · Suniarsih · Tuwel
Bumijawa	52466	Batumirah · Begawat · Bumijawa · Carul · Cawitali · Cempaka · Cintamanik · Dukuh Benda · Guci · Gunung Agung · Jejeg · Muncanglarang · Pagerkasih · Sigedong · Sokasari · Sokatengah · Sumbaga · Traju
Dukuhturi	52192	Bandasari · Debong Wetan · Dukuhturi · Grogol · Kademangaran · Karanganyar · Kepandean · Ketanggungan · Kupu · Lawatan · Pagongan · Pekauman Kulon · Pengabean · Pengarasan · Pepedan · Sidakaton · Sidapurna · Sutapranan
Dukuhwaru	52451	Blubuk · Bulakpacing · Dukuhwaru · Gumayun · Kabunan · Kalisoka · Pedagangan · Selapura · Sindang · Slarang Lor
Jatinegara	52473	Argatawang · Capar · Cerih · Dukuhbangsa · Gantungan · Jatinegara · Kedungwungu · Lebakwangi · Lembasari · Luwijawa · Mokaha · Padasari · Penyalahan · Setail · Sumbarang · Tamansari · Wotgalih
Kedungbanteng	52472	Dukuhjati Wetan · Karanganyar · Karangmalang · Kebandingan · Kedungbanteng · Margamulya · Penujah · Semedo · Sumingkir · Tonggara
Kramat	52181	Babakan · Bangungalih · Bongkok · Dampyak · Dinuk · East Mejasem · Jatilawang · Kemantran · Kemuning · Kepunduhan · Kertaharja · Kertayasa · Ketileng · Kramat · Maribaya · Munjungagung · Padaharja · Plumbungan · Tanjungharja · West Mejasem
Lebaksiu	52461	Balaradin · Dukuhdamu · Dukuhlo · Jatimulya · Kajen · Kambangan · Kesuben · Lebakgowah · Lebaksiu Lor · Lebaksiu Kidul · Pendawa · Slarang Kidul · Tegalandong · Timbangreja · Yamansari
Margasari	52463	Danaraja · Dukuh Tengah · Jatilaba · Jembayat · Kaligayam · Kalisalak · Karangdawa · Marga Ayu · Margasari · North Prupuk · Pakulaut · South Prupuk · Wanasari
Pagerbarang	52462	Jatiwangi · Karanganyar · Kedungsugih · Kertaharja · Mulyoharjo · Pagerbarang · Pesarean · Rajegwesi · Randusari · Semboja · Sidomulyo · Srengseng · Surokidul
Pangkah	52472	Balamoa · Bedug · Bogares Kidul · Bogares Lor · Curug · Depok · Dermasandi · Dermasuci · Dukuhjati Kidul · Dukuhsembung · Grobog Kulon · Grobog Wetan · Jenggawur · Kalikangkung · Kendalserut · Paketiban · Pangkah · Pecabean · Pener · Penusupan · Purbayasa · Rancawiru · Talok
Slawi	52419	Dukuhwringin · Slawi Kulon · Dukuhsalam
Slawi	52416	Kalisapu
Slawi	52414	Trayeman · Kudaile
Slawi	52411	Kagok · Slawi Wetan
Slawi	52413	Pakembaran
Slawi	52412	Procot
Suradadi	52182	Bojongsana · Gembongdadi · Harjasari · Jatibogor · Jatimulya · Karangmulya · Karangwuluh · Kertasari · Purwahamba · Sidoharjo · Suradadi
Talang	52193	Bengle · Cangkring · Dawuhan · Dukuhmalang · Gembong Kulon · Getaskerep · Kajen · Kaladawa · Kaligayam · Kebasen · Langgen · Pacul · Pasangan · Pegirikan · Pekiringan · Pesayangan · Talang · Tegalwangi · Wangandawa
Tarub	52184	Brekat · Bulakwaru · Bumiharja · Jatirawa · Kabukan · Kalijambe · Karangjati · Karangmangu · Kedokan Sayang · Kedung Bungkus · Kemanggungan · Kesadikan · Kesamiran · Lebeteng · Mangunsaren · Margapadang · Mindaka · Purbasana · Setu · Tarub
Warureja	52183	Banjaragung · Banjarturi · Demangharjo · Kedungjati · Kedungkelor · Kendayakan · Kreman · Rangimulya · Sidomulyo · Sigentong · Sukareja · Warureja

== Government ==
=== From Mataram era to Dutch East Indies era ===
- Ki Gede Sebayu (Democrat) is level with Regent (1601 - 1620) Buried in Danawarih Village, Balapulang District.
- Ki Gede Honggowono (Democrat) is level with Regent (1620 - 1625) Buried in Kalisoka Village, Dukuhwaru district.
- Prince Duke Arya Martoloyo "The First Duke of Tegal" (1625 - 1678).
- Tumenggung Sindurejo aka Pranantaka aka Gendowor (1678 - 1679).
- Tumenggung Honggowono aka Duke Reksonegoro I (1679 - 1680).
- Tumenggung Secowijoyo (1680 - 1697).
- Tumenggung Secomenggolo (1697 - 1700).
- Raden Mas Tumenggung Tritonoto (1700 - 1702).
- Tumenggung Bodroyudho Secowardoyo I aka Duke Reksonegoro II (1702 - 1746).
- Tumenggung Bodroyudho Secowardoyo II aka Duke Reksonegoro III (1746 - 1776) Buried in Kalisoka Village, Dukuhwaru district.
- Tumenggung Kartoyudho aka Duke Reksonegoro IV (1776 - 1800).
- Raden Mas Panji Haji Cokronegoro IV (1800 - 1816) Buried in Semedo Village, Kedungbanteng district.
- Tumenggung Surenggono (1816) Died after being appointed as Tumenggung.
- Tumenggung Surodiwongso aka Tumenggung Suronegoro (1816 - 1819).
- Tumenggung Secomenggolo (1819 - 1821).
- Raden Mas Arya Haji Reksonegoro VI (1821 - 1857).
- Tumenggung Sosronegoro (1857 - 1858).
- Raden Mas Ronggo Surodipuro (1858 - 1862).
- Raden Tumenggung Widyoningrat (1862 - 1864).
- R. Tumenggung Panji Sosrokusumo (1864 - 1869).
- R.M. Ore (R.M.A. Reksonegoro VII) (1869 - 18 ...).
- R.M. Kis (R.M.A. Reksonegoro VIII) (... - 1903) Buried In Pesarean Village, Adiwerna District.
- R.M. Suyitno (R.M.A. Reksonegoro IX) (1903 - 1929).
- R.M. Susmono (R.M.A. Reksonegoro X) (1929 - 1935).
- J. Patih R. Subiyanto (1935 - 1937).
- R. Tumenggung Slamet Kertonegoro (1937 - 1942).

=== From the Japanese colonial era to the Old Order era, the New Order era and the Reformation era ===
- Mr. Moh. Besar Mertokusumo (concurrently Burgermester) (1942 - 1944).
- Raden Sunaryo (1944 - 1945).
- Kyai Abu Sujai "As the First Ulama who became the Regent" (1945 - 1946) Buried In Talang Village, Talang District.
- Prawoto Sudibyo (1946 - 1948)
- R. Soeputro (1948 - 1949)
- R.M. Susmono Reksonegoro (1949 - 1950)
- R.M. Sumindro (1950 - 1955)
- R.M. Projosumarto (1955 - 1960)
- Sutoro (1960 - 1966)
- Munadi (January 1966 - December 1966)
- R. Sutarjo (December 1966 - December 1967)
- Col. R. Soepadhi Joedodarmo (1967 - 1973)
- Lieutenant Colonel. R. Samino Sastrosuwignyo (1973 - 1977)
- Drs. Herman Sumarmo (Ymt) (1977 - 1978)
- Hasyim Dirjosubroto (1978 - 1989)
- Drs. H. Wienachto (1989 to 1991)
- Drs. Sudiatno (January 1991 - August 1991)
- Drs. H. Soetjipto (August 1991 - July 1998)
- Drs. Setiawan Sadono (Plt) (July 1998 - June 1999)
- Drs. H. Soediharto (June 1999 - January 2004)
- Agus Riyanto, S.Sos, M.M. (January 2004 - August 2011)
- H.M. Heri Soelistiawan, S.H., M.Hum. (August 2011 - May 2013)
- Drs. Haron Bagas Prakosa, M.Hum. (Plt Regent of Tegal) (May 2013 - June 2013)
- Ir. Satriyo Widodo (Plt.) (June 2013 - October 2013)
- Ki Enthus Susmono, Ph.D. (October 2013 - 2018)
- Drs. Sinoeng Nugroho Rahmadi, MM. (2018 - 2018)
- Dra. Hj. Ummi Azizah (2018 - 2023)

== Population ==
Tegal Regency is the 4th most densely populated regency in Central Java (after Kudus Regency, Sukoharjo Regency and Klaten Regency), based on the 2023 official estimates. The main population distribution lies to the south of Tegal City and along the Tegal - Slawi Highway.

=== Language ===
In daily life, the people of Tegal Regency use Banyumasan-Javanese Language with Tegalese dialect, which is now known as Tegalese Language.

=== Economy ===
==== Home industry ====
The people of Tegal Regency have many businesses in the home industry sector, including casting, metalworking, textile, shuttlecock, furniture, and pottery. There are also industrial plants of chalk and powder raw materials in the area of Margasari District as the main supplier of powder in Tegal Regency.

==== Agriculture and plantation ====
The people of Tegal Regency also work in agriculture and plantation sectors, especially in the southern part of Tegal Regency especially in the Districts of Bumijawa and Bojong.

==== Marine and fisheries ====
In the marine and fisheries sector, coastal residents, especially in Suradadi District, work as fishermen in the Java Sea and South China Sea (including the Riau Islands). The catches are sold to the fishing port of Jakarta, Cirebon, Pekalongan and Tegal City. Coastal residents of Tegal Regency include many who have opened shrimp farming businesses, and milkfish (also the sale of seeds).

==== Livestock ====
In the livestock sector, the people of Tegal Regency have many businesses in the field of poultry farms, like Tegal Duck (Indian Runner) for the supply of the salted egg industry in Brebes. In the countryside there are also goats, cows and buffaloes, which are traditionally cultivated.

==== The Tegal Stalls ====
The people of Tegal Regency include many who go to work in other cities on Java Island (especially in Jakarta) and on other islands. Many of the businesses opened are Tegal Food Stalls (Indonesian : Warung Tegal or "warteg") which are incorporated in the Cooperative of Tegal Stalls (Indonesian : Koperasi Warung Tegal or "Kowarteg"), that selling martabak telur (from Lebaksiu District), and others. On the days before Idul Fitri, the people from Tegal Regency who work elsewhere go home from the region where they work to meet their family and bring the money from their work/ business.

== Education ==
Schools in Tegal Regency include the following:

=== Level junior high school ===
District	Junior High School & Islamic Junior High School
Adiwerna	Adiwerna 1 Junior High; Adiwerna 2 Junior High; Adiwerna 3 Junior High; Adiwerna 4 Junior High; Adiwerna 5 Junior High; Adiwerna Muhammadiyah Junior High; Sunan Kalijaga NU Junior High; Sunan Kalijaga NU Islamic Junior High; Filial Al Iman Islamic Junior High
Balapulang	Balapulang 1 Junior High; Balapulang 2 Junior High; Prince Dipenegoro Junior High; Ki Gede Sebayu Junior High; Ihsaniyah Balapulang Junior High; Islam Nurul Ulum Junior High; Balapulang 3 One Roof Junior High; Darussalam Islamic Junior High; Al Islamiyah Islamic Junior High; Ciptasari Islamic Junior High; Ahmad Dahlan Muhammadiyah Islamic Junior High; Nurul Islam Islamic Junior High; Nurul Inayah Islamic Junior High; Nurul Huda NU Islamic Junior High; Al Muawanah Islamic Junior High; Tasywiriyah Islamic Junior High
Bojong	Bojong 1 Junior High; Bojong 2 Junior High; Bojong Islamic Junior High; Al Azhar Islamic Junior High; Attarmasie Islamic Junior High; Hasyim Asy'ari Islamic Junior High
Bumijawa	Bumijawa 1 Junior High; Bumijawa 2 Junior High; Bumijawa 3 Junior High; Bumijawa 4 Junior High; Bumijawa 5 One Roof Junior High; Bumijawa Ma'arif NU Junior High; Aswaja Islamic Junior High; Al Ittihad Islamic Junior High; Sigedong Ma'arif NU Islamic Junior High; Miftahul Huda One Roof Islamic Junior High; Jejeg NU Islamic Junior High
Dukuhturi	Dukuhturi 1 Junior High; Dukuhturi 2 Junior High; Dukuhturi 1 NU Junior High; Dukuhturi 2 NU Junior High; Dukuhturi Muhammadiyah Junior High; Bhakti Praja Suradadi Junior High; Al Amin Bandasari NU Junior High; Darussalam Islamic Junior High; Al Munawaroh Islamic Junior High; Mambaul Huda Islamic Junior High; Dukuhturi Muhammadiyah Islamic Junior High
Dukuhwaru	Dukuhwaru 1 Junior High; Dukuhwaru 2 Junior High; Dukuhwaru Ma'arif NU Junior High; Prince Purbaya Junior High; Al Fahruriyah Islamic Junior High
Jatinegara	Jatinegara 1 Junior High; Jatinegara 2 Junior High; Jatinegara 1 Ma'arif NU Junior High; Jatinegara 2 Ma'arif NU Junior High; Jatinegara 3 Ma'arif NU Junior High; Jatinegara Muhammadiyah Junior High; Al Ikhlas Junior High; Fatahillah Junior High; Kusuma Husada Islamic Junior High; Mambaul Ulum Islamic Junior High; Jatinegara Ma'arif NU Islamic Junior High; Sitail NU Islamic Junior High; Miftahul Ulum Islamic Junior High; Al Falah Islamic Junior High
Kedungbanteng	Kedungbanteng Junior High; Bhakti Praja Kedungbanteng Junior High; Husnaba Islamic Junior High
Kramat	Kramat 1 Junior High; Kramat 2 Junior High; Kramat Muhammadiyah Junior High; Hidayatusshibyan Junior High; PGRI Kramat Junior High; Kramat NU Islamic Junior High
Lebaksiu	Lebaksiu 1 Junior High; Lebaksiu 2 Junior High; Al Usmaniyyah Junior High; Lebaksiu Muhammadiyah Junior High; Ma'hadut Tholabah Islamic Junior High; Al Madinah Islamic Junior High; Lebaksiu Islamic Junior High; Model Islamic Junior High; Lebaksiu NU Islamic Junior High; Nurul Ulum Kesuben Islamic Junior High; Al Amiriyah Islamic Junior High
Margasari	Margasari 1 Junior High; Margasari 2 Junior High; Margasari 3 Junior High; Bhakti Praja Margasari Junior High; Margasari Ma'arif NU Junior High; Margasari Muhammadiyah Junior High; Miftahul Ulum NU Islamic Junior High; Nurul Ulum Islamic Junior High; Darul Mujahadah Islamic Junior High; South Prupuk NU Islamic Junior High; Salafiyah Islamic Junior High; As Syafi'iyah Islamic Junior High
Pagerbarang	Pagerbarang 1 Junior High; Pagerbarang 2 Junior High; Yaspi Islamic Junior High; IPTEK Randusari Islamic Junior High; Al Quddus Salam Islamic Junior High
Pangkah	Pangkah 1 Junior High; Pangkah 2 Junior High; Pangkah 3 Junior High; Pangkah Ma'arif NU Junior High; Pangkah Muhammadiyah Junior High; Mahkota Al Munawaroh Integrated Islamic Junior High; Bhakti Praja Pangkah Junior High; Raden Fatah Islamic Junior High; Raudlotut Tholibin Islamic Junior High; Pangkah NU Islamic Junior High; Darul Qudwah Integrated Islamic Junior High; Pecabean One Roof Islamic Junior High
Slawi	Slawi 1 Junior High; Slawi 2 Junior High; Slawi 3 Junior High; Dharma Bakti Junior High; Slawi Muhammadiyah Junior High; Purnama Junior High; Manunggal Slawi Extraordinary Junior High; Luqman Al Hakim Integrated Islamic Junior High; Slawi Islamic Junior High
Suradadi	Suradadi 1 Junior High; Suradadi 2 Junior High; Suradadi 3 NU Junior High; Suradadi Muhammadiyah Junior High; Jatibogor Islamic Junior High; Attaqwa Islamic Junior High; Darul Karomah Islamic Junior High; Al Fatah Islamic Junior High
Talang	Talang 1 Junior High; Talang 2 Junior High; Talang 3 Junior High; Walisongo Talang Junior High; Penawaja NU Junior High; Al Mi'raj Junior High; Ashidiqiyah Islamic Junior High; Bustanul Huda Islamic Junior High; Wahid Hasyim NU Islamic Junior High; Mambaul Hikmah NU Islamic Junior High
Tarub	Tarub 1 Junior High; Tarub 2 Junior High; Hasyim Asy'ari NU Junior High; Takhassus Al Qur'an Junior High; PGRI Tarub Junior High; Tarub Muhammadiyah Junior High; Hasyim Asy'ari NU Islamic Junior High; Hidayatusshibyan Islamic Junior High; Al Khairiyah Islamic Junior High; Al Kamal Islamic Junior High
Warureja	Warureja 1 Junior High; Warureja 2 Junior High; Warureja 3 Junior High; Daaru Ulil Albaab Junior High; Nurul Ulum Banjarturi Islamic Junior High; Baitul Ashfiya Islamic Junior High; Warureja NU Islamic Junior High

=== Level senior high school ===
District	Senior/Vocational/Islamic High School
Adiwerna	Bhakti Praja Adiwerna High School; Penawaja High School; Adiwerna 1 Vocational School; Adiwerna 2 Vocational School; Baitunnur Al Maktubiyah Vocational School; Bhakti Praja Adiwerna Vocational School; Islamiyah Adiwerna Vocational School; Adiwerna Muhammadiyah Vocational School; Adiwerna NU Vocational School; Penawaja NU Vocational School; Al Iman Islamic High School
Balapulang	Balapulang High School; Al Muawanah High School; Darussalam Balapulang Vocational School; Al Ittihad Islamic High School; Al Islamiyah Islamic High School; Darussalam Islamic High School; Ahmad Dahlan Muhammadiyah Islamic High School
Bojong	Bojong High School; Al Musyafa Vocational School; Hasyim Asy'ari Vocational School
Bumijawa	Bumijawa High School; Arrizqo Vocational School; Andalusia Islamic High School
Dukuhturi	Dukuhturi Vocational School; Dukuhturi NU Vocational School; Nasional Vocational School; Farmasi Al Amin Vocational School; Grafika Dukuhturi Vocational School
Dukuhwaru	Dukuhwaru High School; Saka Medika Vocational School; Baruna Vocational School; Bhakti Praja Dukuhwaru Vocational School; Telkom Adhi Karya Vocational School
Jatinegara	Jatinegara Ma'arif NU High School; Jatinegara Ma'arif NU Vocational School; Grafika Jatinegara Vocational School; Al Ikhlas Islamic High School
Kedungbanteng	Walijawa Vocational School
Kramat	Kramat High School; Kramat Muhammadiyah Vocational School; Kramat NU Vocational School; Insan Mulia Vocational School
Lebaksiu	Diponegoro High School; Lebaksiu Ma'arif High School; Diponegoro Vocational School; Al Amiriyah Vocational School; Al Yaman NU Vocational School; Nurul Ulum Vocational School; Al Fajar Vocational School; Lebaksiu Muhammadiyah Vocational School; Entrepreneur NU Vocational School; Babakan Islamic High School; Al Madinah Islamic High School; Ma'hadut Tholabah Islamic High School
Margasari	Margasari High School; Margasari Muhammadiyah High School; Bhakti Praja Margasari Vocational School; Bina Nusantara Mandiri Vocational School; Margasari Ma'arif NU Vocational School; Margasari Muhammadiyah Vocational School; Asy-Syafi'iyah Islamic High School; Darul Mujahadah Islamic High School; Miftahul Ulum Margasari NU Islamic High School
Pagerbarang	Pagerbarang High School; Pagerbarang Islamic High School
Pangkah	Pangkah High School; Kusuma Bangsa Vocational School; Peristek Vocational School; Shofa Vocational School; Islam Mahkota Al Munawarah Vocational School; Raden Fatah Islamic High School; Raudlotut Tholibin Islamic High School
Slawi	Slawi 1 High School; Slawi 2 High School; Slawi 3 High School; Slawi 1 Vocational School; Slawi 2 Vocational School; An Nur Vocational School; Bhakti Praja Slawi High School; Bina Nusa Vocational School; Slawi NU Vocational School; Slawi Muhammadiyah Vocational School; YPE Nusantara Vocational School
Suradadi	Suradadi High School; Suradadi NU High School; Suradadi Muhammadiyah High School; Suradadi Ma'arif NU Vocational School; Bhakti Praja Suradadi Vocational School; SUPM Yamipura Vocational School
Talang	Wahid Hasyim NU High School; Talang Ma'arif NU Vocational School; Bhakti Praja Talang Vocational School; Farmasi Permata Medika Vocational School
Tarub	Hasyim Asy'ari NU High School; Tarub Muhammadiyah High School; Hasyim Asy'ari NU Vocational School
Warureja	Warureja High School; Warureja Vocational School; Daaru Ulil Al Baab High School

=== Level college ===
District	College
Adiwerna	Baja Tegal Polytechnic
Slawi	Bakti Negara Tegal Islamic Religion College; Bhamada Health Science College; IEC Putra Bangsa Foreign Language Academy
Talang	Purbaya Polytechnic

=== Level Islamic Boarding School ===
District	Islamic Boarding School
Balapulang	Darussalam Kalibakung; Ahmad Dahlan Harjawinangun
Bojong	At Tauhidiyah Giren Cikura
Lebaksiu	Ma'hadut Tholabah Babakan; Al-Mukhlisin Lebakgowah Foundation
Margasari	Darul Mujahadah Prupuk
Talang	At Tauhidiyah Giren Talang
Tarub	Hasyim Asy'ari

== Tourism ==
=== Tourism site ===
- Guci Hot Water Bath (Guci Tourism Site), located in Bumijawa District on the slopes of Mount Slamet, about 30 km from Slawi town.
  In Guci there are 10 waterfalls. Among them are Bath 13 and Shower 7, local residents often soak and bathe, because it is believed to cure skin diseases. In Guci also available the horses for rent to go sightseeing enjoy the scenery around. This tourism site is available a variety of facilities such as lodging (hotels and villas), forest tours, heated swimming pool, tennis court and football as well as the campground. Horses are also available to rent. Jedor Waterfall is upland.
- Purwahamba Indah (Purin) Beach, located in Suradadi Subdistrict on North Coast road.
- Cacaban Lake, located in Kedungbanteng subdistrict.
- Mount Sitanjung, located in Lebaksiu subdistrict which is a sacred place in the Great Day of Java and Islam.
- Curug Cantel, is the highest waterfall in Tegal Regency with a height of about 70 meters located in Bumijawa subdistrict.
- Mount Batu, located in Batuagung village in Tegal Regency, stretches from south to north, and from west to east.
- Beko Lake, a green lake due to a mixture of sulfur and surrounded by limestone mountains. This tourist attraction is located in Margasari District.
- Hanging Bridge at Kaligung Dam, Danawarih village, near Ki Gede Sebayu tomb.

=== Interesting place ===
- Slawi Square, is a large park with a large fountain located in the center of Slawi Town right in front of the Pendopo of Tegal Regency.
- Slawi People's Park in Procot, Slawi Town.
- MAKO BRIGIF-4 (Infantry Brigade Command Headquarters), Slawi Town.
- Radar Unit 214/Tegal, (Indonesian: Satuan Radar 214/Tegal), is an air defense element located directly under the National Air Defense Sector Command I. It is located in the northern region of Central Java Province in charge of carrying out air defense operations, especially the National air observations. It is further said that Radar Unit 214/Tegal in its main duty has full authority in maintaining sovereignty in the air with all the capabilities it possesses.
  This radar unit formerly was named "Radar Unit 214/Pemalang". The change of the Radar Unit name is based on the Decree of the Chief of Staff of the Air Force No. Kep-1046/XII/2015 issued on December 15, 2015. In addition, the change of name of Radar Unit is also on the consideration of the territorial aspect in which this Unit is in Tegal Regency so that the use of the Radar Unit of Pemalang name is not relevant anymore with the current condition.
- Tri Sanja Stadium, Persekat (Tegal Regency Football United) Headquarters.
- Mount Gantungan, in Jatinegara subdistrict, where several towers relay TV stations.
- Slutu Mlaku is an agro tourism located in Kedungsukun village, Adiwerna subdistrict. Businesses include Kedungsukun Market and Herlan's Babbling Bird Studio.

=== Educational tourism ===
- Gerakan Banteng Nasional (GBN) Struggle Monument, located in Procot, Slawi Town right in front of Poci Monument Roundabout.
- Ancient Human Site Semedo, is a site of ancient humans and ancient animals located in Semedo village, Kedungbanteng.

=== Religious tourism ===
- Surau Ponolawen, is a place for pilgrimage, there is a sacred tomb that is said to be the tomb of Sheikh spreader of Islam first in the area, located in Pagiyanten village bordering Kedungsukun village, Adiwerna.

=== Worship place ===
- Great Mosque of Tegal Regency.

=== Spot photos ===
- Torch Statue Roundabout, in Pakembaran.
- Poci Monument Roundabout, in Slawi Town.
- Pujasera Park, in Slawi Town.

=== Historic site ===
- Slawi 3 Elementary School (formerly Putri Elementary School) (Dutch heritage).
- Procot 1 Elementary School (Dutch heritage), at Jl. Nangka No. 3 Procot, Slawi Town.
- Pangkah Sugar Factory, in Pangkah subdistrict.

== Culinary ==
=== Typical food ===
- Bogana Rice - Rice-like rice megon.
- Bongkok Ketupat - Ketupat from the village of Bongkok.
- Blengong Sate - Sate whose meat comes from animal crosslinking between duck and mentok (blengong).
- Duck Majir Sate
- Glabed Ketupat
- Kemronyos - Typical Sate Tegal
- Kupat Sambel Tahu Lengko Mbah Pa'ong - Typical food from Margasari, Tegal | Margasari] area. Made from natural rice wrapped in coconut leaves with a shape like urung. And mixed with bean sprouts, chunks [aci tofu], sprinkled with extra spicy peanut sauce and sprinkled with fried onions and yellow noodle crackers.
- Mendoan - Fried flour tempeh with seasoning, it's fried and undercooked. As a drinking companion with Poci Tea and it's served with soy sauce and mixed with cayenne pepper. Mendoan can also be found in Banyumasan area.
- Ponggol Devil Rice
- Ponggol Rice
- Rujak teplak - Rujak with a tape sauce.
- Sega lengko - Rice with complementary ingredients such as tempeh, tofu sliced dice, bean sprouts, raw cabbage, and peanut sauce along with crackers.
- Tegal Sate - Sate young goat with soy chili sauce.
- Tegal Soto - Chicken soto / goat soto from Tegal with spice tauco and bean sprouts.

Typical Drink

- Poci Tea is a tea that is brewed in a pot made of clay and drunk with stone sugar. Slogan of Poci Tea is "wasgitel" meaning wangi, panas, sepet, legi lan kentel (Eng : fragrant, hot, spicy, sweet, and thick), Tegal regency until now also known as a tea-producing center.

=== Tegal typical snacks ===
==== Fried food and snack food ====
- Aci Tofu
- Anthor Crackers - Crackers made from cassava fried with coconut pulp (sand kaligung). To enjoy it must provide a drink because if you eat this cracker then the throat will feel hoarse.
- Bogares Salted Peanuts - Snacks of marinated peanuts, this snack comes from the village of Bogares Kidul.
- Ear Tofu - Ear Tofu is given a dough of tapioca starch and shaped like an ear which is then fried.
- Gejos - Food made from grated-cassava which is filled with red sugar.
- Olos - This snack is made of flour and formed round, then filled with sliced cabbage, onion and cayenne pepper. Then fried to harden for make it crispy. This food comes from Jatirawa village.
- Opak - A thin round meal made from cassava, can also be eaten with chili sauce.
- Pilus - Snack made of wheat and small sphere-shaped.
- Petis - Food made from squeezed soybean juice that is then crushed and given chili pepper and then cooked. Petis can also be cooked with chicken bones or goat bones to make it more enjoyable.
- Plethok Tofu

==== Various cakes ====
- Bongko Cake
- Jenang / Dodol Glempang
- Lolom Cake
- Martabak Lebaksiu
- Semprong
- Talam Cake
- Topsy-Turvy Gemblong
- Wrinkles
