= Jatibarang, Brebes =

District in Brebes Regency, Central Java Province, Indonesia

Coordinates: 6°58′4″S 109°3′51″E

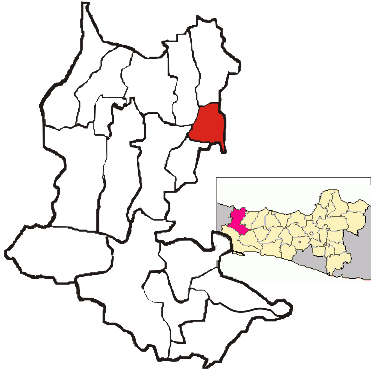
Location in Brebes Regency

Jatibarang District is an administrative district (Indonesian: Kecamatan) in Brebes Regency, Central Java, Indonesia. It covers 36.39 km^{2} (14.05 sq mi) and had a population of 82,868 at the 2010 Census and 87,185 at the 2020 Census.

== Jatibarang town ==
Jatibarang town is located 12 km (7.5 mi) south of the town of Brebes. In Jatibarang there are remains of a colonial Dutch sugar factory.

== List of villages ==
1. Bojong
2. Buaran
3. Janegara
4. Jatibarang Kidul
5. Jatibarang Lor
6. Kalialang
7. Kalipucang
8. Karanglo
9. Kebogadung
10. Kebonagung
11. Kedungtukang
12. Kemiriamba
13. Kendawa
14. Kertasinduyasa
15. Klampis
16. Klikiran
17. Kramat
18. Pamengger
19. Pedeslohor
20. Rengasbandung
21. Tegalwulung
22. Tembelang

== Border ==
- North: Brebes District
- South: Tegal Regency
- West: Songgom District
- East: Tegal Regency

== Interesting places ==
- Al-Ittihad Mosque Jatibarang
- Jatibarang Brebes Sugar Mill

== Others ==
"Sate Goat" (Indonesia: Sate Kambing) Food that is the most famous In Jatibarang, has a unique taste. With a pin coconut palm leaf rib. sate is not like other sate goat which generally use bamboo burned with charcoal, which is a special tree Semboja. perhaps with charcoal aroma sate this will have a special taste.
