= Brebes Regency =

Regency in Central Java, Indonesia

Brebes Regency Kabupaten Brebes
- Regency

Other transcription(s)
  - Javanese: ꦑꦨꦸꦥꦠꦺꦧꦽꦧꦼꦱ꧀
  - Sundanese: ᮊᮘᮥᮕᮒᮦᮔ᮪ ᮘᮢᮨᮘᮨᮞ᮪
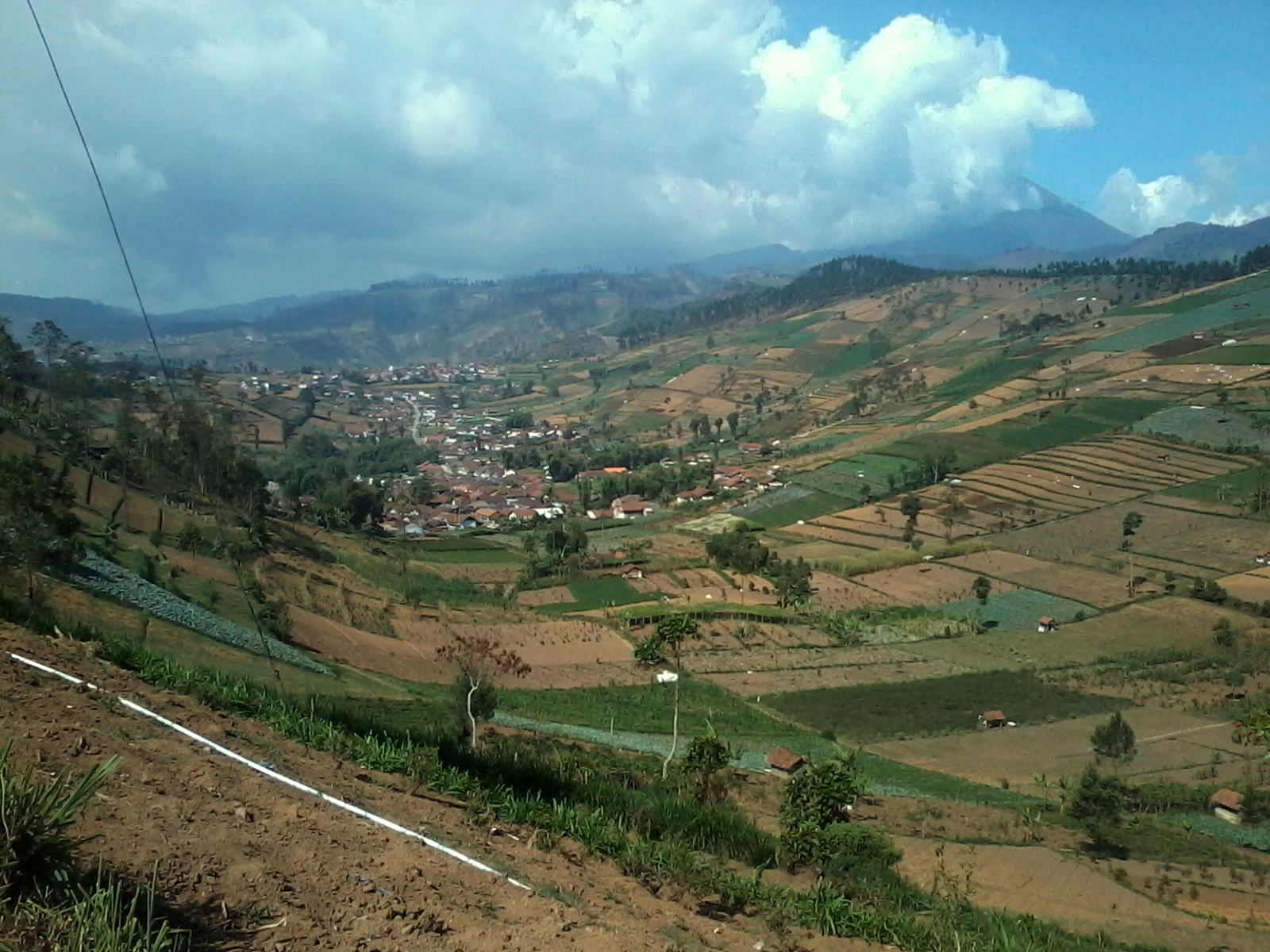
- Kaligua valley, in Paguyangan District

- Seal
- Nickname: Brebes
- Motto: Mangesti Wicara Ebahing Praja
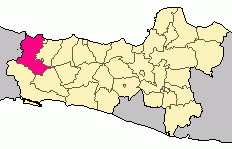
- Location within Central Java

- Location in Indonesia
- Coordinates: 7°04′S 108°53′E
- Country: Indonesia
- Province: Central Java

Government
  - Regent: Paramitha Widya Kusuma
  - Vice Regent: Wurja

Area
  - Total: 1,769.62 km^{2} (683.25 sq mi)

Population (end 2025 estimate)
  - Total: 2,087,331
  - Density: 1,179.54/km^{2} (3,054.98/sq mi)
- Demonym(s): Brebian; Warga Brebes (id); Wong Brebes (jv); Urang Brebes (su)
- Time zone: UTC+7 (WIB)
- Area code: 0283
- Website: brebeskab.go.id

Brebes (Indonesian pronunciation: [brə'bəs], Javanese: ꦧꦽꦧꦼꦱ꧀, Sundanese: ᮘᮢᮨᮘᮨᮞ᮪) is a regency (Indonesian: kabupaten) in the northwestern part of Central Java province in Indonesia. It covers an area of 1,769.62 km^{2}, and it had a population of 1,733,869 at the 2010 Census and 1,978,759 at the 2020 Census; the official estimate as of the end of 2025 was 2,087,331 (comprising 1,057,876 males and 1,029,455 females). Its capital is the large town of Brebes in the northeast corner of the regency, immediately adjacent to the neighbouring city of Tegal.

It is bordered to the north by the Java Sea, to the east by Tegal city and Tegal Regency, to the southeast by Banyumas Regency, to the south by Cilacap Regency, and to the west by West Java Province (Kuningan Regency and Cirebon Regency).

== Administrative districts ==
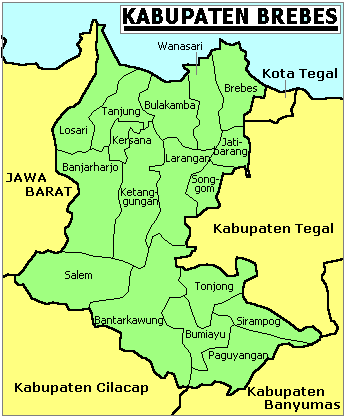
Districts of Brebes Regency

Brebes Regency comprises seventeen districts (kecamatan), tabulated below with their areas and their populations at the 2010 Census and the 2020 Census, together with the official estimates as of the end of 2025. They are grouped for convenience into four geographical regions, which have no administrative significance. The table also includes the locations of the district administrative centres, the number of administrative villages in each district (totaling 292 rural desa and 5 urban kelurahan - the latter all in Brebes District), and its post code.

The first six districts in the table below are the most southerly, and are generally highlands, reaching an altitude of 875 metres in Sirampog District, while the remaining eleven districts are more northerly and generally lower-lying, and have a higher population density, reaching over 2,000 persons per km^{2} in Brebes, Jatibarang and Wanasari Districts (all three in the northeast of the regency and forming part of the Tegal Metropolitan Area). The table below groups the districts accordingly into four areas for geographical purposes, which have no legal or administrative significance.

Kode Wilayah	Name of District (kecamatan)	Area in km^{2}	Pop'n 2010 Census	Pop'n 2020 Census	Pop'n end 2025 Estimate	Admin centre	No. of villages	Post code
33.29.01	Salem	167.21	56,861	63,462	66,193	Salem	21	52275
33.29.02	Bantarkawung	208.18	87,537	102,815	109,929	Bantarkawung	18	52274
33.29.03	Bumiayu	82.09	96,201	112,680	120,316	Bumiayu	15	52273
33.29.04	Paguyangan	108.17	96,268	112,174	119,475	Paguyangan	12	52276
33.29.05	Sirampog	74.19	61,687	69,901	73,452	Sridadi	13	52272
33.29.06	Tonjong	86.55	65,232	76,477	81,697	Tonjong	14	52271
Totals	Southern sector	725.39	463,786	537,509	571,062		93	
33.29.14	Bulakamba	120.36	162,478	181,758	189,806	Bulakamba	19	52253
33.29.15	Larangan	160.25	136,825	157,505	166,773	Larangan	11	52262
33.29.16	Ketanggungan	153.41	133,770	144,524	148,402	Ketanggungan	21	52263
33.29.10	Songgom	52.65	68,374	85,122	93,613	Songgom	10	52266
Totals	Central sector	486.67	501,447	568,909	598,594		61	
33.29.11	Kersana	26.97	57,854	67,322	71,657	Kersana	13	52264
33.29.12	Losari	91.79	120,363	138,582	146,750	Losari	22	52255
33.29.13	Tanjung	72.09	91,660	105,155	111,159	Tanjung	18	52264
33.29.17	Banjarharjo	161.75	118,070	129,783	134,384	Banjarharjo	25	52265
Totals	Northwest sector	352.60	387,947	440,842	463,950		78	
33.29.07	Jatibarang	36.39	82,868	87,185	88,382	Jatibarang	22	52261
33.29.08	Wanasari	75.34	140,663	161,893	171,403	Wanasari	20	52252 ^{(a)}
33.29.09	Brebes (district)	92.23	157,149	182,421	193,940	Brebes	23 ^{(b)}	52211: 52219
Totals	Northeast sector	203.96	380,680	431,499	453,725		65	
	Totals	1,769.62	1,733,869	1,978,759	2,087,331	Brebes	297	

Notes: (a) except for the village of Pesantunan (which has the post code 52221) and the village of Pebatan (which has the post code 52222).
(b) comprises 5 kelurahan (Brebes, Gandasuli, Limbangan Kulon, Limbangan Wetan and Pasarbatang) and 18 desa.

== Cuisine ==
Brebes Regency is known for its shallots (red onions) and salted duck egg (telur asin in Indonesian). Other popular dishes include Sate Blengong and Peuyeum Ketan from Salem, one of the seventeen districts in Brebes Regency.
