= ECLA =

ECLA can refer to

- European Company Lawyers Association
- United Nations Economic Commission for Latin America and the Caribbean, also abbreviated by UNECLAC or ECLAC now, previously called "United Nations Economic Commission for Latin America", or UNECLA.
- European Classification, a patent classification.
- European College of Liberal Arts, the former name of Bard College Berlin, a private college in Berlin, Germany
- Emerson College Los Angeles

== See also ==
- ELCA
