= Ikmal Jaya =

Indonesian politician

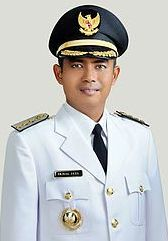

Mayor of Tegal
- In office 23 March 2009 – 23 March 2014
- Preceded by: Adi Winarso
- Succeeded by: Siti Masitha Soeparno

Personal details
- Born: 14 July 1973 (age 53) Tegal, Central Java, Indonesia

Ikmal Jaya (born 14 July 1973) is an Indonesian businessman and former politician who served as the mayor of Tegal, Central Java, between 2009 and 2014. After his tenure as mayor, he was arrested by the Corruption Eradication Commission, and was imprisoned until 2022.

== Early life ==
Ikmal Jaya was born on 14 July 1973 in Tegal. He studied there, graduating from high school in 1991. Afterwards, he studied accounting in Yogyakarta and later obtained a bachelors in accounting from the Sebelas Maret University in Surakarta. Jaya's father, Ismail, had founded the Dewi Sri bus company which ran routes around Tegal and Brebes alongside routes to Jakarta.

== Career ==
Aside from continuing to run Dewi Sri, Jaya also expanded the business to operate bus services in residential areas around Jakarta such as BSD City, Lippo Karawaci, and Bintaro Jaya. In 2008, Jaya ran as mayor of Tegal, with the support of PDI-P, PPP, and PKS. His running mate was Habib Ali Zaenal Abidin. The ticket won the election with 88,662 votes out of 129,529 cast (71%) in a five-candidate race. He was sworn in as mayor on 23 March 2009. To promote the city's economic development, Jaya promoted annual programs – "Tegal Sehat" (Healthy Tegal) in 2010, "Tegal Cerdas" (Smart Tegal) in 2011, "Tegal Bisnis" (Business Tegal) in 2012, "Tegal Maritim" in 2013, and "Tegal Wisata" (Travel Tegal) in 2014. Starting in July 2010, the city began providing scholarships for poor students' studies. In 2010, he was elected as chairman of PDI-P's Tegal branch.

Jaya ran for a second term in the city's 2013 mayoral election, but was defeated in the four-candidate race by the Siti Masitha Soeparno-Nursholeh ticket. Jaya secured 43,640 votes (39.74%), while Soeparno-Nursholeh won 49,434 (45.02%). Soeparno was sworn in to replace Jaya on 23 March 2014.

=== Arrest and prison ===
On 10 February 2015, Jaya was arrested by the Corruption Eradication Commission under charges of corruption, related to a land exchange between a private company and the city government. He had been designated as a suspect in the case since April 2014. The Semarang Corruption Court sentenced him to five years in prison. He appealed to the Central Java High Court, which enforced the Corruption Court's ruling and increased his sentence to eight years. During his sentence, Jaya published a translated Quran written in Pegon script in 2020.

Jaya was released on 20 June 2022. Following his release, he stated in an interview that he would no longer participate in politics.

== Family ==
He is married to Rosalina. Jaya has three siblings, including two other elected regional leaders: Mukti Agung (regent of Pemalang, 2021–2022) and Idza Priyanti (regent of Brebes, 2012–2022).
