= Idza Priyanti =

Indonesian businesswoman and politician

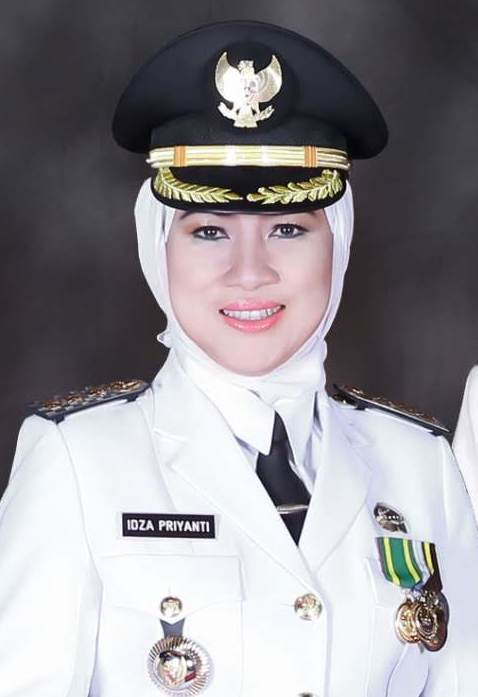

Regent of Brebes
- In office 4 December 2012 – 4 December 2022
- Preceded by: Agung Widiyantoro
- Succeeded by: Urip Sihabudin (act.)

Vice Regent of Brebes
- In office 2 November 2011 – 4 December 2012
- Preceded by: Agung Widiyantoro
- Succeeded by: Narjo

Personal details
- Born: 9 January 1971 (age 54); Tegal, Central Java, Indonesia
- Political party: PDI-P

Idza Priyanti (born 9 January 1971) is an Indonesian businesswoman and politician of the Indonesian Democratic Party of Struggle. She was regent of Brebes Regency, Central Java for two terms between 2012 and 2022. Before entering politics, she worked in her family's bus company.

== Early life and education ==
Idza Priyanti was born in Tegal city on 9 January 1971, as the third child of six from Ismail and Rukhayah. She would receive her bachelor's degree in 2012, from the Pancasakti University in Tegal.

== Career ==
When her older brother Ikmal Jaya, the previous CEO of their family bus company PO Dewi Sri, left the company due to his election as mayor of Tegal, Priyanti became the new CEO. On 2 November 2011, she was appointed as vice regent of Brebes, as the elected vice regent Agung Widiyantoro had been elevated into regent.

In the 2012 Brebes regency election, Priyanti ran as a regent candidate with Narjo as her running mate and was elected with 452,120 votes (51.85%), defeating Widiyantoro. Priyanti and Narjo were sworn in on 4 December 2012. She was reelected in the 2017 regency election, defeating former Minister of Agriculture Suswono.

After the end of her tenure in 2022, she ran as a PDI-P candidate for the House of Representatives from Central Java IX district (Brebes, Tegal, and Tegal Regency) in the 2024 legislative election, but failed to win a seat.

== Family ==
Priyanti's siblings include two other elected regional leaders: Mukti Agung (regent of Pemalang, 2021–2022) and Ikmal Jaya (mayor of Tegal, 2009–2014).
