= Muhammad Zakir =

Mayor of Tegal
- In office 12 June 1989 – 23 September 1998
- Preceded by: Sjamsuri Mastur
- Succeeded by: Adi Winarso

Personal details
- Born: 1939 or 1940; Padang Panjang, Dutch East Indies
- Died: 11 May 2012 (age 71–72)

Military service
- Branch/service: Indonesian Army
- Rank: Lieutenant colonel

Muhammad Zakir (1939/1940 – 11 May 2012) was an Indonesian military officer and politician who served as the mayor of Tegal, Central Java from 1989 until his removal in 1998.

== Career ==
Zakir, with the rank of lieutenant colonel in the Indonesian Army, was sworn in as the mayor of Tegal on 12 June 1989. He had previously been commander of the city's military district between 1984 and 1987.

Following the fall of Suharto, tensions developed between Tegal's citizens and Zakir due to the latter's perceived arrogance. Further issues included Zakir's intervention in the city's woodworking industry and the city's rejection of kuningisasi (deliberate painting of buildings in yellow in order to promote the ruling party Golkar, promoted by then governor Soewardi). Following large-scale student protests, the city's Regional House of Representatives voted to withdraw their support for Zakir, and he was removed as mayor by the Minister of Home Affairs on 23 September 1998.

== Later life and death ==
After his removal from office, he was sentenced for corruption related to several municipal projects in 1997–1998 by the Tegal District Court in 2000 and was sentenced to two years' prison, in addition to a fine of Rp 73 million. Following failed appeals, he was jailed in 2007 for 23 months (having been imprisoned for one month in 2000). He died on 11 May 2012.
