= Indonesia large-scale social restrictions =

Restrictions during COVID-19 pandemic

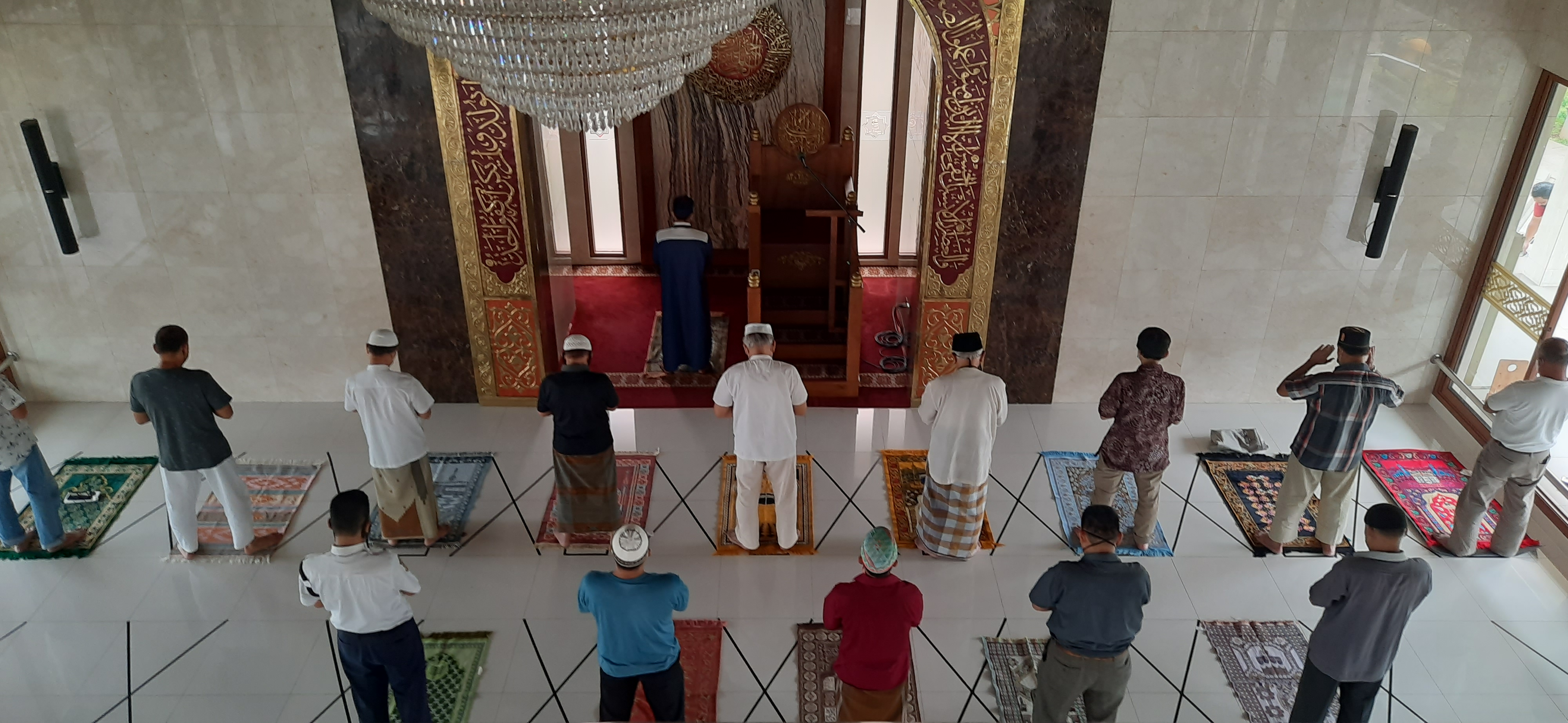
Muslims in Indonesia pray in congregation while imposing to strict protocols during the global pandemic. Physical distancing and the wearing of masks in public is mandatory in Indonesia during the COVID-19 outbreak, including in places of worship.

Large-scale social restrictions or LSSR (Indonesian: Pembatasan Sosial Berskala Besar or PSBB) was a health and public movement restriction issued by the Indonesian government in response to prevent the COVID-19 pandemic from spreading. The restrictions were implemented by local government with the approval of the Ministry of Health. It includes measures such as closing public places, schools, restricting public transport, and limiting travel from and to the restricted areas. On 7 January 2021, the Ministry of Home Affairs decreed the rename of the measure in Java and Bali into the Community Activities Restrictions Enforcement or CARE.

On 30 December 2022, the government revoked the policy and lifted the restrictions in all regions in the country.

== Background ==
The first cases of COVID-19 were confirmed in Indonesia on 2 March 2020, when two residents of Depok, West Java tested positive for the virus. On 15 March, with 117 confirmed cases, President Joko Widodo had called for Indonesians to exercise social distancing measures, with some regional leaders in Jakarta, Banten and West Java had already closed down schools and places of gathering. In a statement the following day, he said he was not going for a full lockdown and lightly criticised regional leaders who tried or proposed to implement lockdown. On 26 March, Dedy Yon Supriyono, mayor of the city of Tegal, Central Java had announced that the city would be implementing a local lockdown measure, closing off multiple access points to and from the city, supposed to be the first city to do so in the country. But Central Java governor Ganjar Pranowo revealed that only the area around city square would be targeted, as the central government had not allowed a city-wide lockdown measure.

== Legal basis ==
On 31 March 2020, Jokowi signed into law Government Regulation No. 21/2020, which regulated large-scale social restrictions, allowing regional governments to restrict the movement of people and goods in and out of their respective localities provided they had received permission from the relevant ministry (in this case the Ministry of Health, under Terawan Agus Putranto). The law also defined a "minimal" restriction as including school and work holidays, limitations on physical worship, and limitations on public gatherings. At the same time, Presidential Decision 11/2020 was also signed, declaring a national disaster. Both laws were based on the Law No. 6 of 2018 on Medical Quarantines, which had provisions for LSSR.

On 7 January 2021, Minister of Home Affairs Tito Karnavian signed Ministerial Instruction No. 1/2021, instructing all governors in Java and Bali region to apply the Community Activities Restrictions Enforcement (CARE or PPKM). The measure, which specifically limits workplaces, restaurants and shopping places as well as fully allows essential sectors activities, was enforced starting on 11 January for two weeks in some cities and regencies in Java and Bali, and could be extended depending on overall evaluation.

== By area ==
=== Jakarta ===
Governor of Jakarta Anies Baswedan applied for LSSR implementation in the capital on 4 April 2020, the first region to formally do so, and the request was approved on 6 April. The measure came into place on 10 April, and was initially intended to remain in place for 14 days. Jakarta's LSSR restricted motorcycle taxis from carrying passengers, banned eating in at restaurants (though allowed takeaways), made it obligatory for hotels to accept people who are self-isolating, and required sporting activities to be done within the vicinity of one's own home. Schools, entertainment sites, and some other locations were closed down, while public transport was limited to operating at 50 per cent capacity. Only those fulfilling "basic needs" and those working in certain sectors are allowed to leave their houses, and they would be required to wear face masks.

To enforce these measures, the Greater Jakarta Metropolitan Regional Police set up checkpoints on main roads and bus terminals, numbering 33 initially. Due to the economic impact of the restrictions, the provincial government established a programme to deliver basic supplies including food, medical masks, and soap to poorer residents of the city.

Restrictions were loosened on 4 June 2020 as the caseload went down below the agreed threshold. However, once the caseload went on the rise once more threatening a shortage of medical capacity, a new wave of restrictions was announced in September 2020. On 25 September 2020 Jakarta administration announced further restrictions until 11 October during the first few weeks of restrictions in September number of new cases were significantly dropped according to the officials.

=== Banten ===
LSSR for the Greater Tangerang area (i.e. Tangerang City, South Tangerang and Tangerang Regency) was approved by the Ministry of Health on 12 April. The restrictions, which came into effect on 18 April, permitted factories to continue running, though workers were required to exercise social distancing and wear masks.

=== West Java ===
After the Ministry of Health approval on 12 April, West Java Governor Ridwan Kamil issued LSSR orders for Bogor, Bogor Regency, Depok, Bekasi and Bekasi Regency, initially in effect between 15 and 28 April 2020, extendable if the virus continued to spread. Similar to Jakarta's, the measures restricted work except for certain vital sectors, limited study and worship activities (except studies related to healthcare research), and restricted passenger counts in all vehicles, including public transport and private cars.

Then following the Greater Bandung area which includes Bandung, Bandung Regency, West Bandung Regency, Cimahi, and Sumedang Regency were proposed to conduct LSSR by West Java Provincial Government to the Ministry of Health on 16 April 2020 and was approved by the Minister of Health the following day. For effective enforcement, it will be carried out according to the agreement of the Governor of West Java with the regents/mayors in the Greater Bandung area on 22 April 2020.

=== East Java ===
The LSSR in East Java was approved on 21 April 2020 by the Minister of Health for Surabaya and the two neighbouring regencies, namely Sidoarjo Regency and Gresik Regency. Previously, the leaders of these three regions were asked by the Governor of East Java Khofifah Indar Parawansa to implement the LSSR in an official discussion. For Sidoarjo Regency, LSSR is implemented in 14 districts, while Gresik Regency applies LSSR in 8 districts. LSSR in the city was ended on 8 June 2020 given the economic impact of the restrictions in the area and instead focused on enforcing strict health protocols in all businesses.

=== Riau ===
The city of Pekanbaru was approved by the Ministry of Health to implement LSSR on 12 April, citing a significant spread of the disease within the city. The measures are planned to come into effect on 17 April, and will include restrictions on gatherings (requiring permits and limited to five people), a partial curfew between 18:00 WIB (11:00 UTC) and 05:00 WIB (22:00 UTC), and capacity restrictions in public transport.

=== South Sulawesi ===
Makassar is the first region on Sulawesi Island that received LSSR approval from the Ministry of Health on 16 April 2020. Previously, the local city government submitted an LSSR to the central government on 14 April 2020. LSSR in Makassar takes effect on 24 April 2020 and ended on 23 May 2020.

=== Central Java ===
Tegal is the first city in Central Java to be granted permission to implement the LSSR, with an approval letter from the national government issued on 17 April 2020. In Tegal, the LSSR began to be implemented on 23 April 2020. LSSR in the city was ended on 23 May 2020.

=== West Sumatra ===
West Sumatra is the first province after Jakarta to implement the LSSR. The Ministry of Health granted a permit to implement the LSSR on 17 April 2020 after being proposed by the Governor of West Sumatra Irwan Prayitno. LSSR began implementation from 22 April to 5 May 2020.

=== Gorontalo ===
Submission of LSSR in Gorontalo was approved by the Minister of Health on 28 April 2020 after the previous submission was rejected.

=== North Kalimantan ===
The submission of the LSSR in Tarakan on 18 April 2020 was approved by the Minister of Health on 19 April 2020, together with Banjarmasin. The LSSR was proposed because there was a significant increase and spread of COVID-19 cases in the city.

=== South Kalimantan ===
Submission of LSSR in Banjarmasin on 17 April 2020 was approved by the Minister of Health on 19 April 2020. So that all city boundaries will be given guard posts.

=== Central Sulawesi ===
Submission of LSSR in Buol Regency was approved by the Minister of Health on 28 April 2020. The submission of the LSSR by the Buol Regency government was due to a surge in the number of positive cases in the area which caused Buol to be the region with the most positive COVID-19 cases compared to other regions in Central Sulawesi.

=== South Sumatra ===
In South Sumatra there were two cities with LSSR status, namely Palembang and Prabumulih, with a separate Minister of Health approval letter dated 12 May 2020. As for these two regions, there were local transmissions or one area transmission. LSSR in these two cities began on 20 May and were ended on 16 June.

== Circumvention ==
Despite the travel restrictions, which suspend all passenger to travel outside areas with at least one confirmed case, many Indonesians have instead disregarded and attempted to evade the travel restrictions in order to perform the Mudik. This has caused scientists to raise concern that this evasion will lead to the diseases which can spread easily from Jakarta and nearby satellite cities, where the main outbreak is occurring, to other regions with weak medical facilities which would be unable to handle large numbers of cases.

There are also few attempts on evading the travel restrictions which had been discovered by the police department, such as one of the cargo trucks was stopped only to find an intermodal container hidden in the car with passengers inside to be transported from Java to Sumatra. Four more additional cargo trucks were also detained when the driver attempted to bring 20 passengers from Jakarta inside the containers covered in tarpaulin.

== Request chronology ==
No.	Area	Province	Status	Decision date	Starting date	Ref
1	Jakarta		Approved	6 April 2020	10 April 2020	
2	Rote Ndao	East Nusa Tenggara	Rejected	11 April 2020		
3	Bekasi, Bekasi Regency, Bogor, Bogor Regency, Depok	West Java	Approved	12 April 2020	15 April 2020	
4	Pekanbaru	Riau	Approved	12 April 2020	17 April 2020	
5	South Tangerang, Tangerang, Tangerang Regency	Banten	Approved	12 April 2020	18 April 2020	
6	Palangka Raya	Central Kalimantan	Rejected	12 April 2020		
7	Sorong	West Papua	Rejected	12 April 2020		
8	Bolaang Mongondow	North Sulawesi	Rejected	15 April 2020		
9	Makassar	South Sulawesi	Approved	16 April 2020	24 April 2020	
10	Bandung, Bandung Regency, Cimahi, Sumedang Regency, West Bandung Regency	West Java	Approved	17 April 2020	22 April 2020	
11	Tegal	Central Java	Approved	17 April 2020	23 April 2020	
12	West Sumatra		Approved	17 April 2020	22 April 2020	
13	Banjarmasin	South Kalimantan	Approved	19 April 2020	24 April 2020	
14	Tarakan	North Kalimantan	Approved	19 April 2020	26 April 2020	
15	Gorontalo	Gorontalo	Rejected	19 April 2020		
16	Surabaya, Sidoarjo Regency, Gresik Regency	East Java	Approved	21 April 2020	28 April 2020	
17	Gowa Regency	South Sulawesi	Approved	22 April 2020	29 April 2020	
18	Gorontalo		Approved	1 May 2020	4 May 2020	
19	West Java		Approved	1 May 2020	6 May 2020	
20	Palangka Raya	Central Kalimantan	Approved	7 May 2020	11 May 2020	
21	Buol Regency	Central Sulawesi	Approved	9 May 2020	12 May 2020	
22	Banjar Regency, Banjarbaru, Barito Kuala Regency	South Kalimantan	Approved	11 May 2020	16 May 2020	
23	Batu, Malang, Malang Regency	East Java	Approved	11 May 2020	17 May 2020	
24	Bengkalis Regency, Dumai, Kampar Regency, Pelalawan Regency, Siak Regency	Riau	Approved	12 May 2020	15 May 2020	
25	Palembang, Prabumulih	South Sumatra	Approved	15 May 2020	20 May 2020	
26	Banten		Approved	September 2020	7 September 2020	
27	Jakarta		Approved	9 September 2020	14 September 2020	
