= Adi Winarso =

Indonesian politician (1950–2023)

Mayor of Tegal
- In office 23 March 1999 – 23 March 2009
- Preceded by: Muhammad Zakir
- Succeeded by: Ikmal Jaya

Personal details
- Born: 11 December 1950 Jepara, Central Java, Indonesia
- Died: 8 September 2023 (aged 72) Surabaya, East Java, Indonesia

Military service
- Branch/service: Indonesian Navy
- Years of service: 1974–1999
- Rank: Naval colonel

Adi Winarso (11 December 1950 – 8 September 2023) was an Indonesian politician and military officer who served as the mayor of Tegal, Central Java, for two terms between 1999 and 2009. Prior to his political career, he served in the Indonesian Navy.

== Early life ==
Winarso was born in the village of Panggang, in Jepara Regency, on 11 December 1950. As a child, he moved to Tegal as his father was assigned to teach at a middle school there. After graduating from high school there, he enrolled at the Indonesian Naval Academy, graduating in 1974.

== Career ==
In 1999, Winarso (who had become a naval colonel in the navy) ran as a candidate for the mayor of Tegal, and won 13 out of 22 cast votes by the city council. He was sworn in as mayor on 23 March 1999. The city council reelected him for a second term in January 2004. He was supported by Golkar both times. Winarso secured 17 votes while his primary challenger, local PDI-P chairman Agil Abdurrohim, won 10 votes. Abdurrohim claimed to have paid the 12 PDI-P councillors a sum of Rp 500 million, and Abdurrohim's supporters rioted in front of the city hall following his defeat.

Winarso inaugurated the Bahari Monument, commemorating the Indonesian Navy's history in the city, in December 2008. During his tenure, several new shopping centers were opened in the city, and Winarso designated a street to become a nighttime culinary destination with street food vendors. He also renovated local markets and relocated the city's bus terminal to a new location with larger space. Close to the end of his tenure, Winarso participated in a talkshow arranged by local cultural observers, which was hosted by Abdurrohim's running mate while Abdurrohim also took part in the show. Winarso's tenure ended on 23 March 2009, and he was succeeded by Ikmal Jaya.

After he was no longer mayor, in 2014, he was questioned by the Corruption Eradication Commission as a witness related to an investigation into Ikmal Jaya. He was hospitalized in 2021 due to respiratory problems.

== Death ==
Adi Winarso died in Surabaya on 8 September 2023, at the age of 72. He was buried there the following day.
