= West Tegal, Tegal =

District in Tegal, Indonesia

West Tegal is an administrative district (kecamatan) in the city of Tegal, Central Java, Indonesia with an area of 12.32 km^{2} and a population of 62,464 at the 2010 Census and 66,924 at the 2020 Census; the official estimate as at the start of 2024 was 70,386.
