= Siti Masitha Soeparno =

Indonesian politician

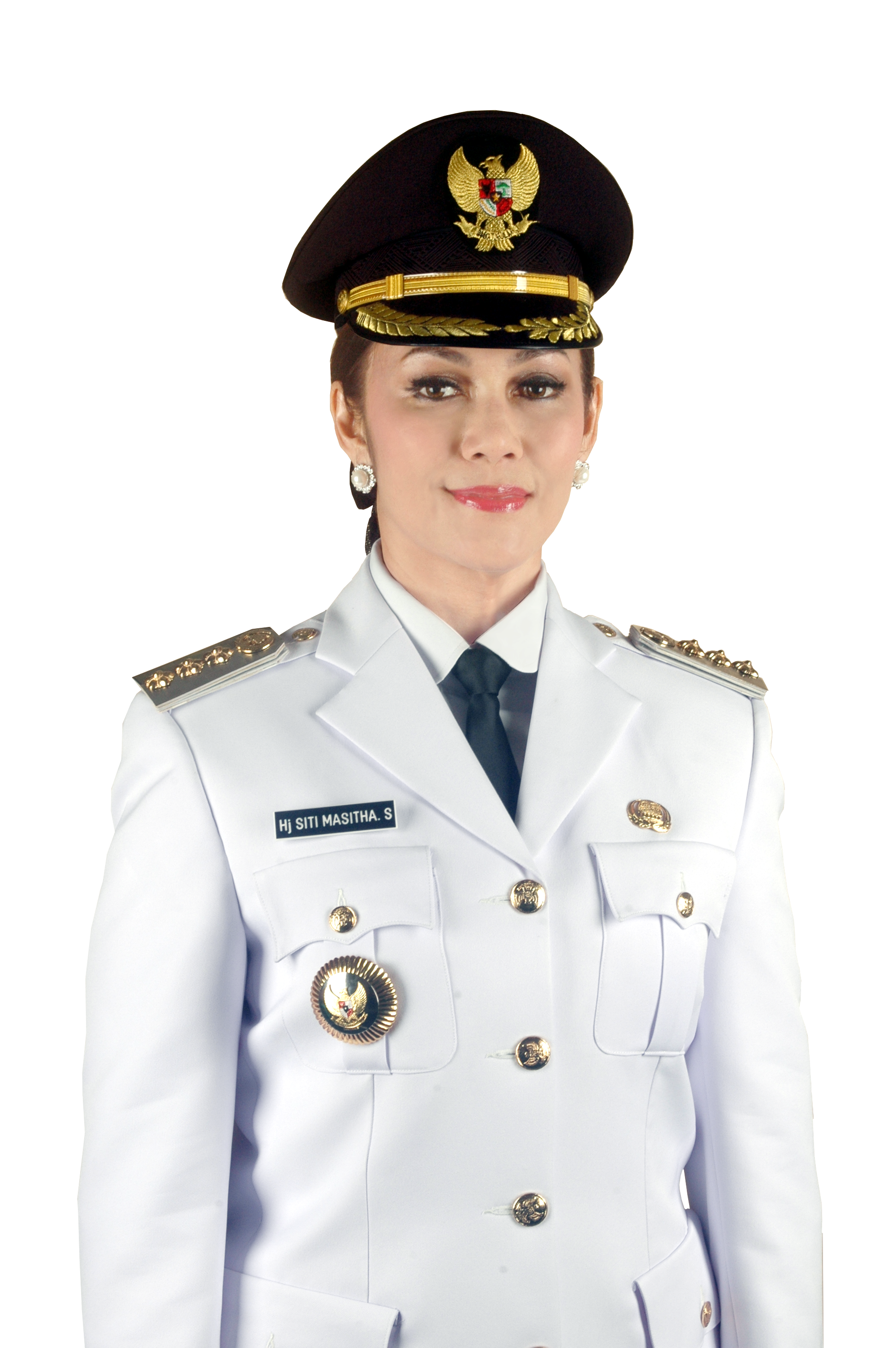

Mayor of Tegal, Central Java
- In office 23 March 2014 – 29 August 2017
- President: Susilo Bambang Yudhoyono
- Preceded by: Ikmal Jaya
- Succeeded by: Nursholeh

Personal details
- Born: 10 January 1964 (age 62) Jakarta, Indonesia
- Citizenship: Indonesian
- Party: Golkar
- Children: 4

Siti Masitha Soeparno (born 10 January 1964) is an Indonesian businesswoman and politician. She served as the mayor of Tegal in Central Java from 2014 to 2017.

On the evening of Tuesday, 29 August 2017, Soeparno was arrested on graft charges by the Corruption Eradication Commission (KPK), leading to her removal from office. Central Java Governor Ganjar Pranowo referred to her arrest as a heavy blow to the entire province and called for a meeting of all mayors as a warning. Soeparno was arrested during a city council meeting at her official residence at the city hall complex. The Commission sealed the Kardinah Regional General Hospital just before the arrest, and the charges were allegedly related to Soeparno's approval of a new ICU built at the hospital. Her arrest occurred during a nationwide sweep of ten local officials by the Commission between July and September 2017.

Soeparno's predecessor, Ikmal Jaya, was also removed from office by the KPK due to corruption, meaning two consecutive mayors of Tegal have been removed on graft charges.
