= Community Activities Restrictions Enforcement =

Quarantine measures to prevent the spread of COVID-19 in Indonesia

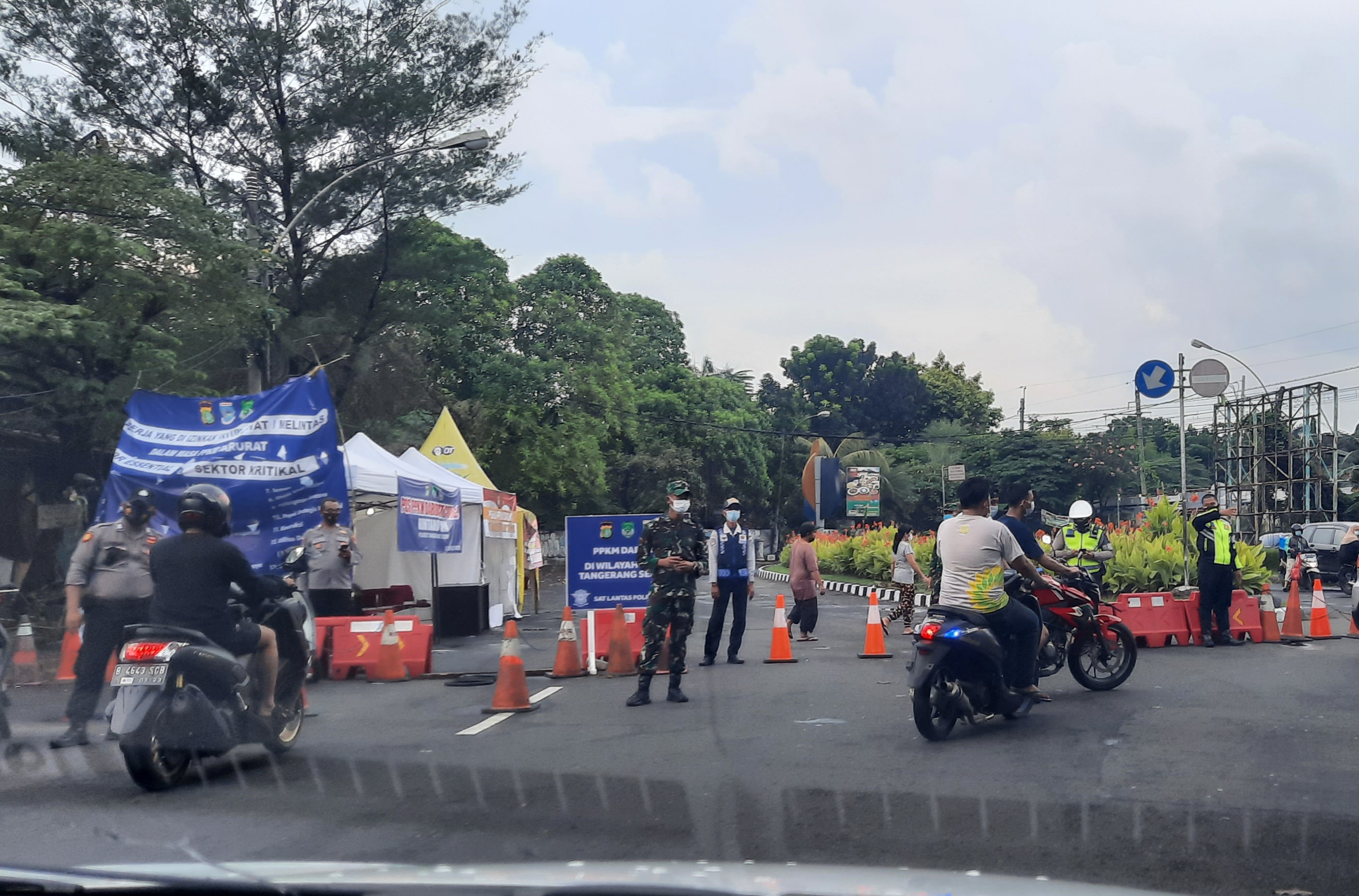
- A roadblock of a street entering Jakarta due to the COVID-19 mass restrictions
- Date: 11 January 2021 – 30 December 2022 (1 year and 353 days)
- Location: Indonesia
- Caused by: COVID-19 pandemic in Indonesia
- Goals: Containment of the pandemic
- Methods: Prohibition of movement and mass assembly in Java and Bali, including all religious, sports, social and cultural activities.; Indonesian barred from leaving their residence unless for essential activities.; All religious activities in mosques, churches and temples suspended.; All industries are closed and remote work is implemented except for infrastructure services and supermarkets, wet markets, grocery stores and multi-functional stores selling daily necessities.; All nurseries, government and private schools, including boarding schools, international school, primary, secondary and pre-university education institutions, public and private universities, and vocational training centers closed
- Status: Declared ended on 30 December 2022
- Result: Restrictions towards Indonesians in Indonesia

The Community Activities Restrictions Enforcement or CARE (Indonesian: Pemberlakuan Pembatasan Kegiatan Masyarakat, commonly referred to as the PPKM) was a cordon sanitaire policy of the Indonesian government since early 2021 to deal with the COVID-19 pandemic. Prior to the implementation of CARE, the government had implemented large-scale social restrictions (LSSR) which took place in a number of regions in Indonesia.

On 30 December 2022, President Joko Widodo announced that the CARE policy had ended for all regions in Indonesia.

== Background ==
The Indonesian government first implemented CARE from 11 to 25 January 2021. The two weeks implementation of CARE was carried out based on the Instruction of the Minister of Home Affairs (Mendagri) Number 1 of 2021 and was implemented in the island of Java and Bali. Previously, in 2020, a number of provinces had implemented large-scale social restrictions (LSSR) to prevent the spread of COVID-19. According to Airlangga Hartanto as Chair of the Committee on COVID-19 Handling and National Economic Recovery (KPC-PEN), the initial initiative to apply for LSSR was with the regional government, while CARE was with the central government. The Deputy Chairperson of KPC-PEN Luhut Panjaitan said that LSSR was carried out non-uniformly, while CARE could be applied uniformly.

=== CARE Levels ===
On 21 July 2021, Tito Karnavian as Minister of Home Affairs announced a new term regarding the CARE mechanism with a scale from the first to the fourth level. The government can determine that an area can apply CARE based on the rate of transmission and the number of active cases of COVID-19 in an area. All cases were counted per 100,000 population per week.

Level	Confirmed case	Inpatient	Patient died	Level of risk
I	Less than 20 people	Less than 5 people	Less than 1 person	Low
II	20–50 people	5–10 people	Less than 2 people	Intermediate
III	50–100 people	10–30 people	2–5 people	High
IV	More than 150 people	More than 30 people	More than 5 people	Very high

== Enforcement ==
=== Summary ===
The following table contains a summary of the implementation of CARE, micro-CARE and emergency CARE which consists of several stages.

Policy	Stage	Start	Up to	Legal basis	Provinces	Ref
CARE	I	11 January 2021	25 January 2021	Minister of Home Affairs Instruction Number 1 of 2021	7 provinces (Jakarta SCR, West Java, Banten, Central Java, Special Region of Yogyakarta, East Java, Bali)	
CARE	II	26 January 2021	8 February 2021	Minister of Home Affairs Instruction Number 2 of 2021	7 provinces	
CARE micro-scale	I	9 February 2021	22 February 2021	Minister of Home Affairs Instruction Number 3 of 2021	7 provinces	
CARE micro-scale	II	23 February 2021	8 March 2021	Minister of Home Affairs Instruction Number 4 of 2021	7 provinces	
CARE micro-scale	III	9 March 2021	22 March 2021	Minister of Home Affairs Instruction Number 5 of 2021	10 provinces (addition: North Sumatra, East Kalimantan, South Sulawesi)	
CARE micro-scale	IV	23 March 2021	5 April 2021	Minister of Home Affairs Instruction Number 6 of 2021	15 provinces (addition: North Sulawesi, South Kalimantan, Central Kalimantan, West Nusa Tenggara, East Nusa Tenggara)	
CARE micro-scale	V	6 April 2021	19 April 2021	Minister of Home Affairs Instruction Number 7 of 2021	20 provinces (addition: North Kalimantan, Aceh, South Sumatra, Riau, Papua)	
CARE micro-scale	VI	20 April 2021	3 May 2021	Minister of Home Affairs Instruction Number 9 of 2021	25 provinces (addition: West Sumatra, Jambi, Lampung, West Kalimantan, Bangka Belitung Islands)	
CARE micro-scale	VII	4 May 2021	17 May 2021	Minister of Home Affairs Instruction Number 10 of 2021	30 provinces (addition: Riau Islands, Bengkulu, Central Sulawesi, Southeast Sulawesi, West Papua)	
CARE micro-scale	VIII	18 May 2021	31 May 2021	Minister of Home Affairs Instruction Number 11 of 2021	30 provinces	
CARE micro-scale	IX	1 June 2021	14 June 2021	Minister of Home Affairs Instruction Number 12 of 2021	34 provinces (addition: Gorontalo, Maluku, North Maluku, West Sulawesi)	
CARE micro-scale	X	15 June 2021	28 June 2021	Minister of Home Affairs Instruction Number 13 of 2021	34 provinces	
CARE micro-scale	XI	22 June 2021	5 July 2021	Minister of Home Affairs Instruction Number 14 of 2021	34 provinces	
CARE micro-scale	XII	6 July 2021	20 July 2021	Minister of Home Affairs Instruction Number 17 and Number 20 of 2021	34 provinces	
CARE micro-scale	XIII	21 July 2021	25 July 2021	Minister of Home Affairs Instruction Number 23 of 2021	34 provinces	
Emergency CARE	I	3 July 2021	20 July 2021	Minister of Home Affairs Instruction Number 15, Number 16, Number 18, and Number 19 of 2021	Java and Bali	
Emergency CARE	II	12 July 2021	20 July 2021		15 regions outside Java–Bali	
CARE level 1–4	I	21 July 2021	25 July 2021	Minister of Home Affairs Instruction Number 22 and Number 23 of 2021	A number of provinces	
CARE level 1–4	II	26 July 2021	2 August 2021		A number of provinces	
CARE level 1–4	III	3 August 2021	9 August 2021		A number of provinces	
CARE level 1–4	IV	10 August 2021	16 August 2021 (23 August 2021 outside Java and Bali)		A number of provinces	
CARE level 1–4	V	17 August 2021	23 August 2021		A number of provinces	
CARE level 1–4	VI	24 August 2021	30 August 2021 (6 September 2021 outside Java and Bali)		A number of provinces	
CARE level 1–4	VII	31 August 2021	6 September 2021		A number of provinces	
CARE level 1–4	VIII	7 September 2021	13 September 2021 (20 September 2021 outside Java and Bali)		A number of provinces	
CARE level 1–4	IX	14 September 2021	20 September 2021		A number of provinces	
CARE level 1–4	X	21 September 2021	4 October 2021		A number of provinces	
CARE level 1–4	XI	5 October 2021	18 October 2021		A number of provinces	
CARE level 1–4	XII	19 October 2021	1 November 2021 (8 November 2021 outside Java and Bali)		A number of provinces	
CARE level 1–4	XIII	2 November 2021	15 November 2021		Java and Bali	
CARE level 1–4	XIV	9 November 2021	22 November 2021		A number of provinces outside Java and Bali	
CARE level 1–4	XV	16 November 2021	29 November 2021		Java and Bali	
CARE level 1–4	XVI	23 November 2021	6 December 2021		A number of provinces outside Java and Bali	
CARE level 1–4	XVII	30 November 2021	13 December 2021		Java and Bali	
CARE level 1–4	XVIII	7 December 2021	23 December 2021		A number of provinces outside Java and Bali	
CARE level 1–4	XIX	14 December 2021	3 January 2022		Java and Bali	
CARE level 1–4	XX	24 December 2021	3 January 2022		A number of provinces outside Java and Bali	
CARE level 1–4	XXI	4 January 2022	17 January 2022		A number of provinces	
CARE level 1–4	XXII	18 January 2022	24 January 2022		A number of provinces	
CARE level 1–4	XXIII	25 January 2022	31 January 2022		A number of provinces	
CARE level 1–4	XXIV	1 February 2022	7 February 2022 (14 February 2022 outside Java and Bali)		A number of provinces	
CARE level 1–4	XXV	8 February 2022	14 February 2022		Java and Bali	
CARE level 1–4	XXVI	15 February 2022	21 February 2022 (28 February 2022 outside Java and Bali)		A number of provinces	
CARE level 1–4	XXVII	22 February 2022	28 February 2022		Java and Bali	
CARE level 1–4	XXVIII	1 March 2022	7 March 2022 (14 March 2022 outside Java and Bali)		A number of provinces	

=== First-stage CARE ===
The first stage of CARE will be implemented in seven provinces in Java and Bali, namely Jakarta Special Capital Region, West Java, Banten, Central Java, Special Region of Yogyakarta, East Java, and Bali, starting from 11 January to 25 January 2021. A number of districts/cities in each province are prioritized to implement PPKM. There are four elements used as parameters for provinces, districts, or cities in the implementation of CARE, namely having

1. a death rate above the national average death rate,
2. cure rate below the national average,
3. active case rate above the national average active case rate, and
4. hospital bed occupancy rate for intensive care unit (ICU) and isolation room above 70%.

Restrictions on community activities are regulated in the Instruction of the Minister of Home Affairs Number 1 of 2021, namely:

- limiting the workplace/office by implementing remote work by 75% and working from office (WFO) by 25% by implementing stricter health protocols;
- carry out online teaching and learning activities;
- essential sectors related to the basic needs of the community can still operate 100% with more stringent regulation of operating hours, capacity, and implementation of health protocols;
- make settings for the application of restrictions:
  - restaurant activities (eating/drinking on site by 25% and for food service via delivery or take-away are still permitted according to restaurant operating hours with stricter implementation of health protocols; and
  - restriction of operating hours for shopping centers/malls until 7:00 PM WIB (Indonesian Western Time);
- allow construction activities to operate 100% with stricter implementation of health protocols;
- allow places of worship to operate with a capacity limitation of 50% with the implementation of stricter health protocols;

=== Second-stage CARE ===
The government has extended the CARE through the Instruction of the Minister of Home Affairs Number 2 of 2021. The second-stage CARE will be held from 26 January to 8 February 2021. In this second stage, the operating hours of shopping centers/malls are changed to 8:00 PM WIB. Meanwhile, based on the results of monitoring of 73 regencies/cities that have implemented PPKM, as many as 29 regencies/cities are still in the high-risk zone, 41 regencies/cities are in the moderate risk zone, and the remaining 3 regencies/cities are in the low-risk zone.

=== Micro-based CARE ===
After being implemented for two stages in which the results were economically ineffective, CARE was changed to micro-based CARE from 9 to 22 February 2021. As before, micro PPKM was implemented in a number of areas in seven provinces. However, in contrast to PPKM, in micro PPKM there are arrangements regarding the establishment of COVID-19 handling posts at village and sub-district levels, the operating hours of shopping centers/malls are more loosely regulated, namely until 9:00 PM WIB (Indonesian Western Time), as well as looser office restrictions, namely 50% working from the office and 50% working from home.

In micro-CARE, restrictions are made at the level of the rukun tetangga (neighbourhood) and rukun warga (hamlet). Based on the Instruction of the Minister of Home Affairs Number 3 of 2021, there are four control zones for the spread of COVID-19 in each RT.

- Green zone — there are no cases of COVID-19 transmission in one RT area. Control scenarios: active surveillance, testing of all suspects, and routine and periodic case monitoring.
- Second zone — there are 1 to 5 houses confirmed positive in one RT during the last seven days. Control scenarios: finding suspects and tracing close contacts, as well as self-isolation for positive patients and close contacts under close supervision.
- Orange zone — there are 6 to 10 houses with confirmed positive cases of COVID-19 in one RT during the last seven days. Control scenario:
  - finding superfluous cases and close contact tracing, as well as self-isolation in positive patients and close contacts under close supervision,
  - closure of houses of worship, children's playgrounds, and other public places, other than essential sectors that are still allowed to operate.
- Red zone — there are more than ten houses that have confirmed positive cases of COVID-19 in one RT during the last seven days. Control scenario:
  - finding suspected cases and tracing close contacts,
  - self-isolate or centrally under strict supervision,
  - closing houses of worship, children's play areas, and other public places except for the essential sector,
  - prohibit crowds of more than three people,
  - limiting entry and exit from the RT area to a maximum of 8:00 PM WIB, and
  - eliminate community social activities in the RT environment that cause crowds and have the potential to cause transmission.

After being implemented for two weeks, the government extended the micro PPKM many times. On June 7, 2021, the Head of the COVID-19 Handling Task Force Ganip Warsito conducted an evaluation of the Micro PPKM, examining from the surge in COVID-19 cases in Kudus, Central Java to implement better monitoring and evaluating of the data.

=== Emergency CARE ===
Joko Widodo's address
President Joko Widodo announcing the Emergency Community Activities Restrictions Enforcement (Emergency CARE), 1 July 2021.

Emergency CARE takes effect from 3 to 25 July 2021, which targets a decrease in the addition of daily confirmed cases to below 10 thousand cases per day. This program is implemented in 136 districts/cities throughout Indonesia by differentiating the level of treatment based on the assessment value by using an approach between the indicators of transmission rate and response capacity, including the level of availability of beds in hospitals.

The tightening of activities carried out includes:

1. 100% remote work for non-essential sectors;
2. All teaching and learning activities are conducted online;
3. For essential sectors, 50% of the maximum working staff from the office (WFO) is applied with health protocols, and for critical sectors, 100% maximum WFO is allowed with health protocols. (The coverage of essential sectors is finance and banking, capital markets, payment systems, information and communication technology, non-quarantine handling hotels, and export-oriented industries; critical sector coverage is energy, health, security, logistics and transportation, food, beverage and supporting industries, petrochemicals, cement, national vital objects, disaster management, national strategic projects, construction, basic utilities (electricity and water), as well as industries for meeting the basic needs of people's daily needs; for supermarkets, traditional markets, grocery stores, and supermarkets that sell daily needs are limited to operating hours until 8:00 PM local time with a visitor capacity of 50%;
4. Activities at shopping centers/malls/trade centers are closed;
5. Restaurants and restaurants do not accept dine-in;
6. The implementation of construction activities (construction sites and project sites) operates 100% by implementing stricter health protocols;
7. Places of worship (mosques, musallas, churches, temples, monasteries, and pagodas), as well as other public places that function as places of worship are not to offer congregational prayer; people are to conduct prayer individually at their homes
8. Public facilities (public areas, public parks, public tourist attractions and other public areas) are temporarily closed;
9. Art/cultural activities, sports, and social activities (locations of arts, culture, sports facilities, and social activities that can cause crowds and crowds) are temporarily closed;
10. Public transportation (public transportation, mass transportation, taxis (conventional and online) and rental vehicles) is enforced with a maximum capacity setting of 70% by implementing stricter health protocols;
11. Wedding receptions are prohibited;
12. Travelers using long-distance transportation modes (airplanes, buses, and trains) must show a vaccine card (minimum vaccine dose I) and H-2 PCR for planes and antigen (H-1) for other long-distance transportation modes;
13. Regional government by deploying the Satpol PP with coordination with the Indonesian National Police assisted by the TNI to implement strict supervision and law enforcement of this policy, especially of point 3;
14. 3T strengthening (testing, tracing, treatment) needs to be continuously implemented. Testing needs to be increased to a minimum of 1 per 1000 population per week, and needs to be increased until the positivity rate is less than 5%, and needs to be increased for suspects, namely those with symptoms, and also in close contacts; tracing should be carried out until >15 close contacts per confirmed case and quarantine should be carried out on those identified as close contacts. Once identified, close contacts should be checked immediately, and quarantine should be carried out. If the test results are positive, then isolation is necessary. If the results of the examination are negative, quarantine should be continued. On the 5th day of quarantine, it is necessary to carry out an exit-test to see if the virus was detected after/during the incubation period. If negative, then the patient is considered to have completed quarantine. Treatment needs to be done comprehensively according to the severity of the symptoms. Only patients with moderate, severe, and critical symptoms need to be hospitalized. Isolation needs to be done strictly to prevent transmission.
15. Achievement of vaccination target of 70% of the total population in priority cities/districts until August 2021

=== CARE level 1-4 ===
CARE level 1-4 is determined based on an assessment of the level of the pandemic situation, which is an indicator for tightening and relaxing efforts to prevent and overcome the COVID-19 pandemic. It could be that one area one day was at level 3, but due to lack of compliance with health protocols, crowding at the community level and so on, the following week it could turn into level 4. This is the terms of explanation:

==== Level 1 (New Normal) ====
Reference indicators for the level of one weekly confirmed case of less than 40 per 100,000 population, weekly treatment of less than 5 per 100,000 population, and weekly BOR of less than 60%. For this level, the conditions are:

1. 100% WFO nonessential sectors for those already vaccinated; essential 100% WFO with two work shifts and critical 100% WFO.
2. supermarket/grocery store/traditional market open 100%.
3. shopping center/mall open with 100% capacity.
4. restaurants/restaurants with a maximum capacity of 75%.
5. school 100% face to face with strict health protocols.
6. 100% places of worship with strict procedures.
7. 100% public facilities with strict procedures.
8. 100% social/cultural/sports activities with strict health protocols.
9. 75% wedding reception with strict health protocols.
10. Public transportation is a maximum of 100% capacity and for travelers, the requirements are a vaccine card and an antigen test.

==== Level 2 (Transition One) ====
The reference indicators for the level of two weekly confirmed cases are 40 - 64 per 100,000 population, weekly treatment 5 to 9 per 100,000 population, and weekly BOR of less than 60%.For this level, the conditions are:

1. nonessential sectors 50% WFO for those already vaccinated; essential 100% WFO with two work shifts and critical 100% WFO.
2. supermarket/grocery store/traditional market open 75%.
3. shopping center/mall open with 50% capacity.
4. restaurants/restaurants with a maximum capacity of 50%.
5. school 50% online and 50% face to face.
6. places of worship 50% with strict procedures.
7. 50% public facilities with strict health protocols.
8. 50% social/cultural/sports activities with strict health protocols.
9. 50% wedding reception with strict health protocols.
10. Public transportation is a maximum of 100% capacity and for travelers the requirements are a vaccine card and an antigen test.

==== Level 3 (Transition Two) ====
The reference indicators for level three are weekly confirmed cases of 65-100 per 100,000 population, weekly treatment 10-30 per 100,000 population, and weekly BOR of 60%-80%.

Provisions for social and economic activities:

1. online teaching and learning activities.
2. office activities 25% WFO and 75% WFH.
3. essential sector activities can be 100% WFO with strict health protocols.
4. supermarket/grocery store/traditional market open 50% capacity until 22.00.
5. shopping centers/malls open until 17.00 with 25% capacity.
6. construction activities can be 100% capacity with strict health protocols.
7. restaurants/restaurants, both stand-alone and in shopping centers can serve dine-in until 17.00 with a capacity of 25%.
8. restaurants/restaurants can still serve take away until 20.00; and specifically those that only serve take away can operate until 24.00.
9. places of worship are prohibited for congregational activities.
10. public facilities closed.
11. social/cultural/sports activities are prohibited.
12. wedding receptions are prohibited.
13. Community celebration activities with a maximum of 25% and without eating on the spot.
14. Public transportation is a maximum of 70% capacity, and for travelers the requirements are vaccine cards, PCR for planes, and antigens for others.

==== Level 4 (Very High Incidence) ====
For level four which was previously called emergency CARE, the reference indicators are weekly confirmed cases of more than 100 per 100,000 population, weekly treatment of more than 30 per 100,000 population, and weekly BOR of more than 80%.

Provisions for social and economic activities:

1. online teaching and learning activities (online).
2. non-essential sectors 0% work from office (WFO); essential sector 25% to 50% WFO depending on the type of service; while the critical sector can be 100% WFO.
3. supermarkets/grocery shops/traditional markets open at 50% capacity until 20.00.
4. shopping centers/malls are closed.
5. construction activities are only for national strategic projects (PSN) and public infrastructure can be at 100% capacity.
6. restaurants/restaurants only serve take away.
7. places of worship are prohibited for congregational activities.
8. public facilities closed.
9. social/cultural/sports activities are prohibited.
10. wedding receptions are prohibited.
11. public transportation maximum 70% capacity.
12. For travelers, the requirements are for a vaccine card and a PCR test for airplane passengers, while for other transports, a vaccine card and an antigen test are required.

From 121 regencies/cities in Java and Bali that apply Emergency CARE, there are 45 regencies/cities with an assessment score of 4, and 76 districts/cities with an assessment score of 3. Meanwhile, since July 12, there have been an additional 15 regencies/cities outside Java-Bali that have also implemented Emergency CARE until the same time limit as it was implemented in Java-Bali.

Province	Assessment Level 4	Assessment Level 3
Banten	Serang City; Tangerang City; South Tangerang City	Lebak; Serang; Tangerang; Cilegon City
Jakarta SCR	Thousand Islands (Jakarta); West Jakarta City; Central Jakarta City; South Jakarta City; East Jakarta City; North Jakarta City	—N/a
West Java	Bekasi; Karawang; Purwakarta; Bandung City; Banjar City; Bekasi City; Bogor City; Cimahi City; Cirebon City; Depok City; Sukabumi City; Tasikmalaya City	Bandung; West Bandung; Bogor; Ciamis; Cianjur; Cirebon; Garut; Indramayu; Kuningan; Majalengka; Pangandaran; Subang; Sukabumi; Sumedang
Central Java	Banyumas; Grobogan; Kebumen; Klaten; Kudus; Pati; Rembang; Sukoharjo; Magelang City; Salatiga City; Semarang City; Surakarta City; Tegal City	Banjarnegara; Batang; Blora; Boyolali; Brebes; Cilacap; Demak; Jepara; Karanganyar; Kendal; Magelang; Pekalongan; Pemalang; Purbalingga; Purwrejo; Semarang; Sragen; Tegal; Temanggung; Wonogiri; Wonosobo; Pekalongan City
Yogyakarta SR	Bantul; Sleman; Yogyakarta City	Gunungkidul; Kulonprogo
East Java	Lamongan; Madiun; Sidoarjo; Tulungagung; Batu City; Blitar City; Kediri City; Madiun City; Malang City; Mojokerto City; Surabaya City	Bangkalan; Banyuwangi; Blitar; Bojonegoro; Bondowoso; Gresik; Jember; Jombang; Kediri; Lumajang; Magetan; Malang; Mojokerto; Nganjuk; Ngawi; Pacitan; Pamekasan; Pasuruan; Ponorogo; Sampang; Situbondo; Trenggalek; Tuban; Pasuruan City; Probolinggo City
Bali	—N/a	Badung; Bangli; Buleleng; Gianyar; Klungkung; Jembrana; Denpasar City
North Sumatra	Medan City	—N/a
West Sumatra	Bukittinggi City; Padang City; Padang Panjang City	—N/a
Riau Islands	Batam City; Tanjungpinang City	—N/a
Lampung	Bandar Lampung City	—N/a
West Kalimantan	Pontianak City; Singkawang City	—N/a
East Kalimantan	Berau; Balikpapan City; Bontang City	—N/a
West Nusa Tenggara	Mataram City	—N/a
West Papua	Manokwari; Sorong City	—N/a

== Responses ==
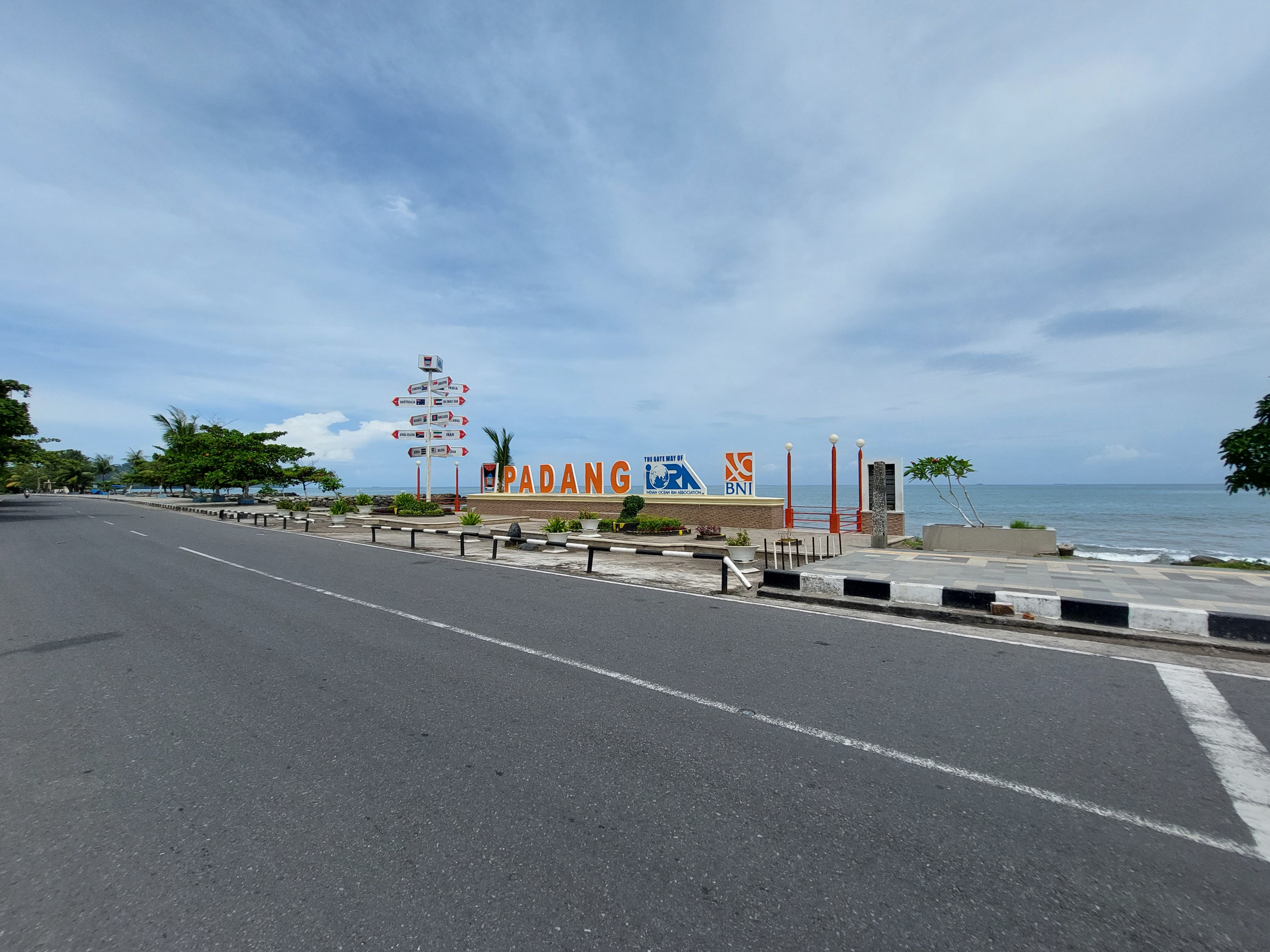
Atmosphere of tourist attraction Padang Beach in Padang, West Sumatra which is closed during emergency CARE.

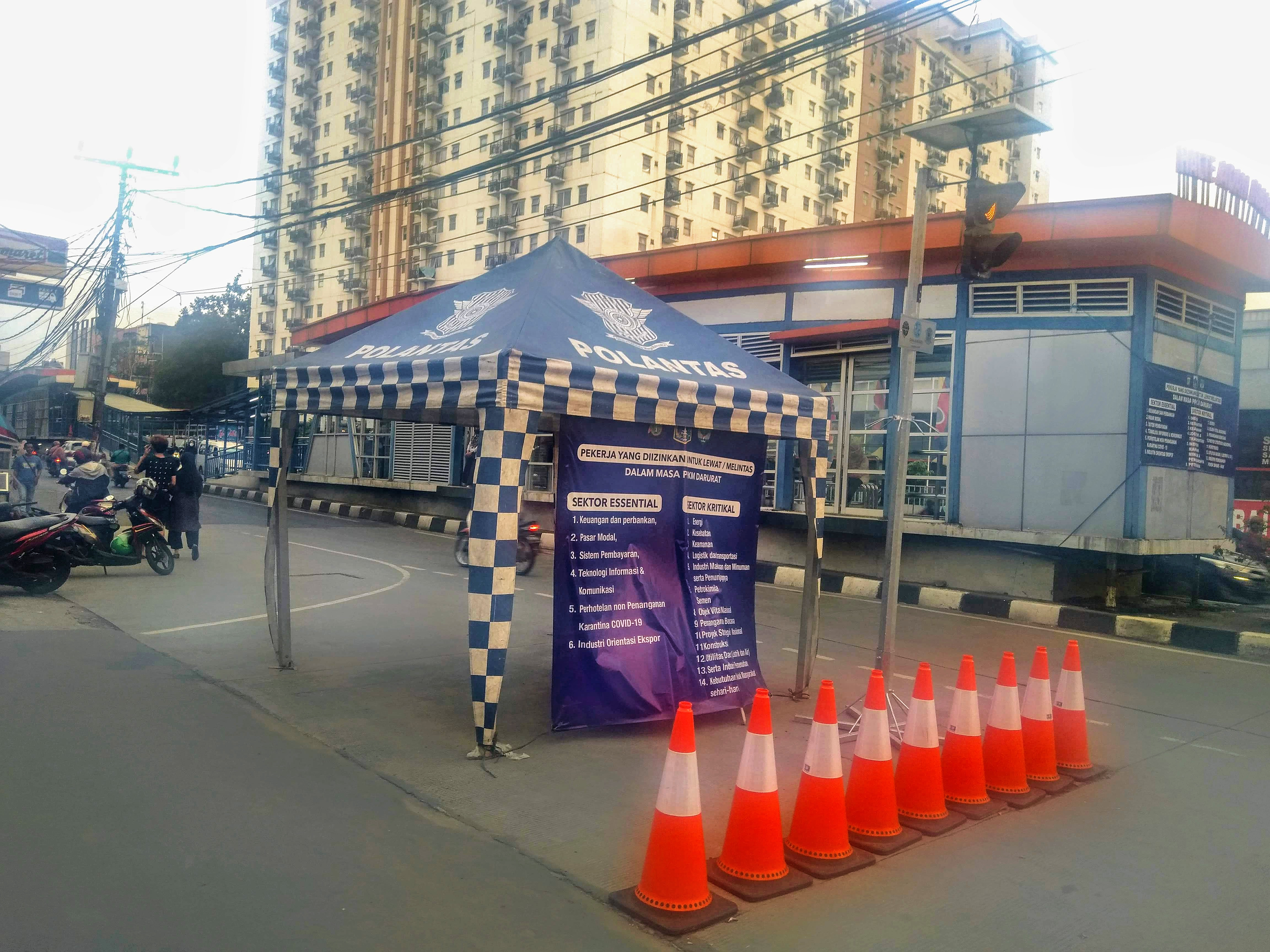
Example of a CARE border at Pesanggrahan, South Jakarta.

=== During the Enforcement ===
In February 2021, an epidemiologist from the University of Indonesia, Tri Yunis Miko Wahyono, assessed that the implementation of CARE was still ineffective. He was of the opinion that the effectiveness of CARE at that time was still less than 30 percent. This is the result of weak supervision and application of 3T (test, tracing, and treatment) in the orange and red zones. Yordan Khaedir, a lecturer at the Faculty of Medicine, University of Indonesia, in his writings in Media Indonesia suggested the application of COVID-19 tracking applications such as Google Data to monitor community mobilization in certain areas. This is considered as one way to increase the effectiveness of social restrictions.

Inconsistent government policies are also a problem in dealing with the pandemic. In the same article, Tri Yuni Miko Wahyono considers the change from Indonesia large-scale social restrictions, the new normal, to Community Activities Restrictions Enforcement is one sign of inconsistent policies implemented by the government. Trubus Rahardiansyah, a public policy observer, views the implementation of micro CARE as "confusing and counterproductive". He questioned the government's policy of re-imposing restrictions on the scale of rukun tetangga and rukun warga even though it has proven to be ineffective. Bambang Rukmino, a police observer from the Institute for Security and Strategic Studies (ISESS), advised the police to be fair and consistent in enforcing the rules. He also commented on how the CARE rules were enforced at a food stall in Kudus, Central Java.

Reporting from Katadata.co.id, Dicky Budiman, an epidemiologist from Griffith University, and Laura Navika Yamani, an epidemiologist from Airlangga University, appreciated the government's implementation of micro Community Activities Restrictions Enforcement. Both consider this restriction as one of the better efforts than no policy at all. However, both of them advised the government to increase surveillance and conduct isolation for COVID-19 cases.

In June 2021, Kurniasih Mufidayati, a member of the House of Representatives Commission IX of the PKS Faction, emphasized the government's obligations as stated in Law Number 6 of 2018 concerning Health Quarantine. In article 4 of the law, the government is responsible for protecting the public from "diseases and/or Public Health Risk Factors that have the potential to cause a Public Health Emergency through the implementation of Health Quarantine". Chairperson of the Indonesian Legal Aid Foundation, Asfinawati, assessed that the implementation of restrictions such as PSBB and CARE is one of the government's options to avoid the obligation to fulfill basic needs as stipulated in the Quarantine Law. On a different occasion, Agus Pambagio, a public policy observer, also questioned the names of CARE thickening and emergency CARE, even though the law calls it quarantine.

Some traders and entrepreneurs consider the emergency CARE which will be implemented starting 3 July 2021, to be quite burdensome for them. The general chairman of the Indonesian Employers' Association, Hariyadi Sukamdani, is concerned that the emergency CARE will disrupt the cash flows of several companies and potentially lead to bankruptcy. The Deputy Chairperson of Indonesian Hotel and Restaurant Entrepreneurs, Emil Arifin, revealed that the ban on eating in places caused the restaurant's operational costs to not be met. This is because take away services on average only contribute to 10 to 20 percent of revenue. Secretary General of the Indonesian Market Traders Association, Reynaldi Sarijowan, reported a decline in turnover of market traders by 55 to 60%. He also stated that the reduction in operating hours and closing of traditional markets led to an increase in several basic commodities.

=== Post-enforcement ===
After the CARE policy lifted, business and industry sectors appreciated the lift. Indonesian Chamber of Commerce and Industry supported the move, hoped the lift will boost the economy.

Ministry of Religious Affairs prepared restoration regulation to restore the condition of religious places and praying places which were affected during the CARE period.

Despite such easement, the Ministry of Health advised the population to maintain a healthy lifestyle like in the pandemic period, since the pandemic has not yet ended.
