= German Bar Association =

Bar association in Germany

- Deutscher Anwaltverein
- Founded: June 2016; 10 years ago
- Type: Bar association
- Purpose: Voluntary representative body for German lawyers and notary lawyers
- Headquarters: 11 Littenstraße; Berlin, 10179
- Region served: Germany
- Director: Rechtsanwältin Eva Schriever
- Website: anwaltverein.de

The German Bar Association (German: Deutscher Anwaltverein – DAV) is a voluntary association of German and German-speaking lawyers founded in June 2016. It seeks to safeguard, protect and promote the professional and economic interests of the Bar, notary lawyers included, especially by promoting fair administration of justice and legislation, education and further training, encouragement of professional solidarity and scientific spirit among lawyers.

The German Bar Association observes political and confessional neutrality and places great emphasis on respect for human rights and the rule of law. Furthermore, it promotes gender equality.

== Structure and organization ==
The DAV represents the German legal profession and aims at uniting all 160,000 lawyers in Germany and German lawyers abroad. Currently it has approximately 66,000 individual members, organized into 259 local bar associations, 13 of which are based outside Germany in Brazil, France (2), Greece, Italy, Netherlands, Luxembourg, Poland, Portugal, Spain, Turkey, Ukraine, and United Kingdom.

== Aims and activities ==
With offices in Berlin and Brussels the German Bar Association purpose is to use its institutional mechanisms and practiced instruments to lobby the European legislative processes. It seeks to directly influence federal and state legislative and executive branches – both through the federal association as well as through local bar associations. The DAV maintains a network of personal contacts with political decision-makers and persons who make decisions that affect its members, in Berlin, Brussels, and other state capitals.

Since the establishment of the German Bar Association its legislative committees have supported and enriched the work of the Executive Board and the management. The legislative committees are composed of members of the legal profession who serve on a voluntary basis. It is the task of the legislative committees to formulate opinions on all relevant draft legislation on the German and European level.

== Publications ==
The German Bar Association publishes the Anwaltsblatt, a monthly journal for lawyers that focuses on the practice of law. The Anwaltsblatt regularly addresses questions regarding taxes and liability and publishes current judgments in the areas of fees and the law of professional rules.

== The DAV Annual Conference ==
Every year, the German Bar Association organizes the DAV Annual Conference Deutscher Anwaltstag. The DAV Annual Conference is the yearly meeting of the German legal profession dedicated to legal policy and sociopolitical issues. Part

icipants are regularly at least 1,800 legal practitioners with different professional backgrounds as well as representatives from politics, the judiciary and science. The DAV Annual Conference usually receives immense attention in the media. It is the biggest event of its kind in Germany.

== Membership ==
The German Bar Association is a member of the following international organisations: American Bar Association (ABA), Council of Bars and Law Societies of Europe (CCBE), European Company Lawyers Association (ECLA), International Association of Young Lawyers (AIJA), International Bar Association (IBA), International Criminal Bar (ICB), Union Internationale des Avocats (UIA).
