= ELCA (disambiguation) =

ELCA most commonly refers to:

- Evangelical Lutheran Church in America, the largest Lutheran body in the United States

ELCA may also refer to:

== Historic trail ==
- El Camino Real de Tierra Adentro

== Religious organizations ==
- Evangelical Lutheran Church of Australia, a predecessor to the Lutheran Church of Australia
- Evangelical Lutheran Church (United States) (1917-1960) (then sometimes called ELCA, formerly the Norwegian Lutheran Church of America)
- Eielsen Synod, the former Evangelical Lutheran Church in America

== Medical procedure ==
- Excimer Laser Coronary Angioplasty

== Other ==
- Enforcement of Limitations on Community Activities
