= Dedy Yon Supriyono =

Indonesian politician

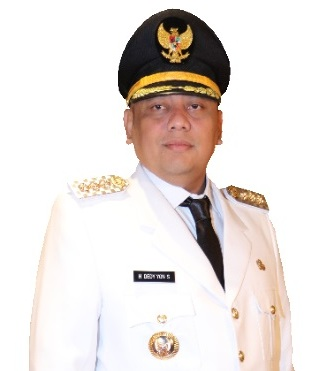

Mayor of Tegal
- Incumbent
- Assumed office 20 February 2025
- Preceded by: Dadang Somantri (acting)
- In office 23 March 2019 – 23 March 2024
- Preceded by: Nursholeh
- Succeeded by: Dadang Somantri (acting)

Member of Central Java Council
- In office 3 September 2014 – 23 March 2019

Personal details
- Born: 14 August 1980 (age 44); Brebes, Central Java
- Political party: Gerindra

Dedy Yon Supriyono (born 14 August 1980) is an Indonesian politician who is the mayor-elect of Tegal, Central Java, having previously served between 2019–2024.

== Early life ==
Supriyono was born in Brebes Regency on 14 August 1980, the son of a successful local entrepreneur Muhadi Setiabudi.

== Career ==
Between 2009 and 2014, Supriyono served in the legislature of Brebes Regency, where he was deputy speaker. Supriyono was a member of Central Java's Provincial Council as part of the Democratic Party's faction in the 2014–2019 term, though he ran as Tegal's mayor during his tenure. In the election, he won with 38,091 votes, and he was sworn in on 23 March 2019.

On 30 March 2020, during the COVID-19 pandemic in Indonesia, Supriyono made a decision to implement a lockdown of Tegal, which restricted movement within the city as the city's government provided some support of food supplies to poorer residents. The lockdown involved closing off of 49 access points into the city and the closure of public spaces, and was launched in response to a returning resident testing positive.

His tenure expired on 23 March 2024 and he was replaced by acting mayor Dadang Somantri and drg.Agus Dwi Sulistyantono. He was reelected for a second term in the 2024 mayoral election with 64,746 votes (46.3%).
