= European Company Lawyers Association =

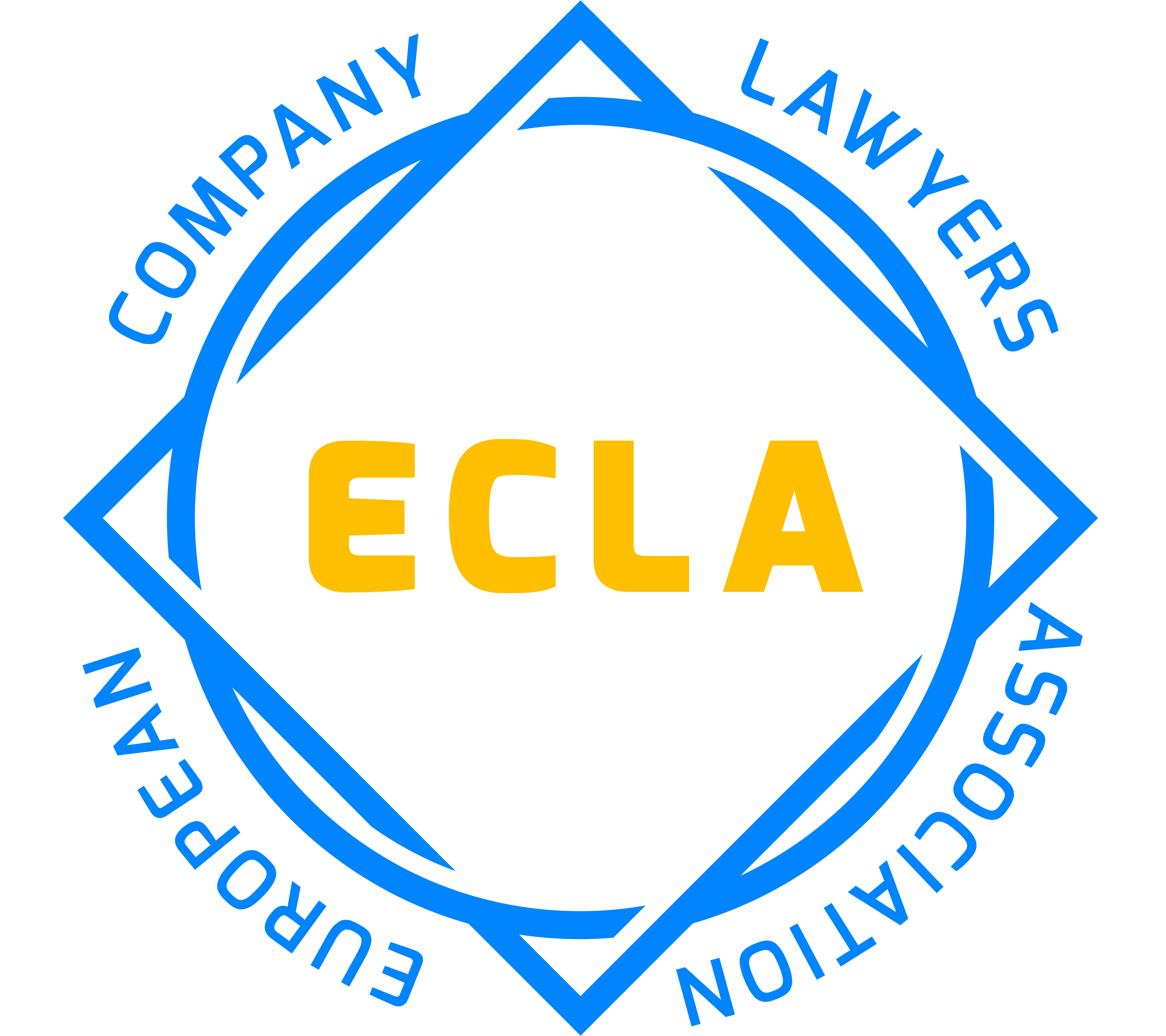
- Abbreviation: ECLA
- Formation: 1983
- Type: International umbrella association of European national associations of company lawyers
- Headquarters: Rue des Sols 8 1000 Brussels
- Location: Brussels, Belgium
- Members: 115,000
- President: Stephanie Fougou
- Director General: Marcus M. Schmitt
- Website: www.ecla.eu

The European Company Lawyers Association (ECLA) is a non-governmental and non-profit organisation and serves as the umbrella organisation for 26 company lawyers associations in Europe, representing over 115,000 in-house counsel from leading corporations across Europe. Established in 1983, ECLA advocates for the profession of in-house lawyers and addresses major challenges for legal in-house departments in European companies. The association is located in the heart of Europe, in Brussels.

== History of ECLA ==
In 1980, an organization of company lawyers in Belgium took the initiative to contact other similar organizations in the Netherlands, England and Wales, Germany, Italy and France. These organizations began exchanging experiences and best practices on legal matters with particular reference to international business and European laws affecting the activities of their respective companies.

At the same time, company lawyers realized that the legal status of their profession was not in all European countries identical. In the UK and Germany company lawyers could be admitted to the national Bar, or to other professional associations (such as the Law Society), while in Belgium, France and Italy that was not permitted. So there were various regimes for company lawyers in the various Member States.

In 1983, ECLA was formed in Belgium as a private non-profit international association following the decision in the A.M.&S. case by the Court of Justice in Luxembourg, which denied the legal professional privilege (LPP) to the company lawyers in an antitrust case.

By 1990, ECLA's membership had grown significantly and included the organizations of company lawyers in Belgium, Denmark, Germany, Finland, France, Italy, the Netherlands, Scotland, England and Wales. After 1999 national organizations of company lawyers from Central and Easter European associations of company lawyers were admitted to ECLA membership.

On 11 April 2018, ECLA opened its new offices in Brussels, Belgium, and hosted the 2018 Reception. “We will bring Europe’s company lawyers closer together, offer a vital and unprecedented platform for networking and best practice sharing within the legal community”, said Jonathan Marsh, President of ECLA. Marcus M. Schmitt, Secretary General of ECLA added: "With the new offices, permanent presence in Brussels and a strong team, the association is taking the next step to becoming the strongest pan-European voice, exclusively dedicated to the profession of company lawyers across the continent."

Past Presidents of the Association
President	Years	Country
Walter Kolvenbach	1984 – 1987	Germany
Barry O’Meara	1987 – 1990	UK
George Carle	1990 – 1992	Belgium
Alan R. Boyd	1992 – 1994	Scotland
Pio Cammarata	1994 – 1996	Italy
Philippe Marchandise	1996 – 1998	Belgium
Colm Mannin	1998 – 2001	Ireland/France
Erik Vilen	2001 – 2003	Denmark
Colin Anderson	2003 – 2005	Scotland
Bengt Gustafson	2005 – 2007	Sweden
Paul de Jonge	2007 – 2008	The Netherlands
Han Kooy	2008 – 2010	The Netherlands
Peter Kriependorf	2010 – 2012	Germany
Philippe Coen	2012 – 2014	France
Sergio Marini	2014 – 2016	Italy
Jonathan Marsh	2016 – 2024	France
Stephanie Fougou	2024 – today	France

Past General Managers and Directors General of the Association
General Manager	Years	Country
Jettie Van Caenegem	before 2007	Belgium
Francesco Benigni	2007 – 2009	Italy
Paul de Jonge	2009 – 2010	The Netherlands
Petr Šmelhaus	2010 – 2014	Czech Republic
Han Kooy	2014 – 2017	The Netherlands
Marcus M. Schmitt	2017 – today	Germany

== Goals and activities of ECLA ==
ECLA aims to develop the legal professional privilege throughout European national jurisdictions, classifying the communication between a company and its in-house lawyers, and the advice sought and provided, as confidential.

In 1995 ECLA presented a position paper to the European institutions, especially the commission's DGIV, to attract their attention on the company lawyers’ status in Europe. It contained a description of the company lawyer's role and function, insisting on the concept of independence, a description of ECLA and its members, and concluded with ECLA's proposals, reported below in summary:

- the company lawyer, being subject to a code of professional ethics and disciplinary rules, should be recognized as a branch of the legal profession, in its own right, by the authorities of the European Union and the Member States; (the ECLA Code of Ethics has been officially adopted by General Assembly in Tallinn on 30 May 2014 with some common principles for practice of company lawyers in Europe).
- that the use of the title "company lawyer" should be protected and reserved to the holders of university qualifications at a common level throughout Europe;
- that the function of company lawyer should be capable of being freely exercised under that title throughout Europe
- that the duties and rights of attorney-client privilege (or legal privilege) shall be clearly ascribed to company lawyers on the same basis as to other lawyers
- that non-exclusive rights of audience for their company as existing in several Member States, be maintained and, where possible, extended to the same extent as for practicing lawyers;
- that holders of the title of company lawyer who have performed that function should be free to join in a national bar or law society or notaries order; and
- that company lawyers should, under conditions to be determined be eligible for appointment to judicial functions in tribunals and courts having jurisdiction on commercial matters.

ECLA promotes the acceptance and demand for an active role of company lawyers and identifies and exploits regulatory opportunities aimed to enhance the position of in-house lawyers. ECLA also seeks to identify and eliminate regulatory and judiciary threats for company lawyers. ECLA pursues these targets through six main activities:

1. Monitoring
2. Representation
3. Cooperating
4. Best Practice Sharing
5. Networking
6. Training

== Member associations ==
- Austria: Vereinigung Österreichischer Unternehmensjuristen (VUJ);
- Belgium: Institut des juristes d’entreprise (IJE/IBJ);
- Croatia: Udruga Korporativnih Pravnika (UKP);
- Czech Republic - Unie Podnikových Právniků České Republiky (UPPCR);
- Denmark: Danske Virksomhedjurister (DVJ);
- England and Wales - The Law Society (LSoEW);
- Estonia: Eesti Juristide Liidu Ettevõtlusjuristide Uhendus (E.E.J.Ü.)
- Finland: Teollisuuslakimiesten Yhdistys ry/Industrijuristföreningen r.f. (TYI);
- France: Association Française des Juristes d’ Entreprise (AFJE);
- France: Cercle Montesquieu (CM);
- Germany: Arbeitsgemeinschaft der Syndikus Anwälte im Deutschen Anwaltverein (DAV) – German Bar Association;
- Germany: Bundesverband der Unternehmensjuristinnen und Unternehmensjuristen e. V. (BUJ)
- Greece: Ελληνική Ένωση Εμμίσθων Δικηγόρων (GILA)
- Ireland: The Law Society of Ireland (LSoI);
- Italy: Associazione Italiana Giuristi di Impresa (AIGI);
- North Macedonia: Corporate Lawyers Association of North Macedonia (MACL);
- Norway: Norges Juristforbund, NJ-P Private Sector (NLA);
- Poland: Krajowa Izba Radców Prawnych (KIRP);
- Portugal: Ordem dos Advogados – Instituto das Modalidades de Exercício da Advocacia (OdA);
- Slovakia: Únia Podnikových Právnikov Slovenskej Republiky (UPPSR);
- Slovenia: Sekcija Korporacijskih Pravnikov Slovenije (SKP);
- Spain: lustre Collegi de l'Advocacia de Barcelona (ICAB);
- Spain: Ilustre Colegio de Abogados de Madrid (ICAM);
- Sweden: Sveriges Bolagsjurister (SBJ);
- Switzerland: Vereinigung Schweizerischer Unternehmensjuristen (VSUJ);
- Turkey: Kurum İçi Avukatlar Derneği (KIAD)

For its members, ECLA offers regular updates on legal challenges and developments for in-house lawyers through its publications, digital and new media streams, conferences and events.
