= Nursholeh =

Indonesian politician (1957–2020)

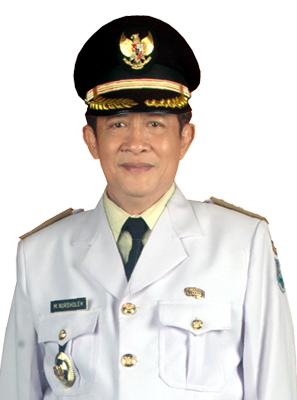

Mayor of Tegal
- In office 31 August 2017 – 23 March 2019
- Preceded by: Siti Masitha Soeparno
- Succeeded by: Dedy Yon Supriyono

Personal details
- Born: 22 August 1957; Tegal, Central Java, Indonesia
- Died: 23 August 2020 (aged 63); Tegal
- Political party: Golkar

Nursholeh (22 August 1957 – 23 August 2020) was an Indonesian politician who served as Mayor of Tegal between 2017 and 2019.

== Early life ==
Nursholeh was born on 22 August 1957 in Tegal, where he completed his education up until he graduated from high school in 1977. He later also pursued higher education in the city, obtaining a bachelor's in education on 1996.

== Career ==
After graduating from high school, Nursholeh found a job in Jakarta as a planning consultant where he worked for 5 years, and he spent 1 year working as a road surveyor in Bali. By 1987, he was a member of Golkar, and by 2009, he was the chairman of Golkar's branch in his hometown, alongside being elected as a member of the city council.

In 2013, he ran as the running mate of Siti Masitha Soeparno in Tegal's mayoral election and the ticket won 45.02% of the votes (49,434 votes). Months after the pair's inauguration in March 2014, Nursholeh spoke publicly about a lack of communication between the two, and claimed that Soeparno refused to delegate tasks to him - a conflict which resulted in some friction with Central Java's governor Ganjar Pranowo.

Soeparno was later arrested by the Corruption Eradication Commission, resulting in Nursholeh becoming acting mayor on 31 August 2017, and later full mayor by 24 September 2018. He ran for a second term in the 2018 local election, but was defeated after winning just 15.48% of the votes, placing him fourth out of five candidates. He died in Tegal on 23 August 2020.
