= Tegal =

City in Central Java, Indonesia

- City
- City of Tegal; Kota Tegal

Other transcription(s)
  - Hanacaraka: ꦡꦼꦒꦭ꧀
  - Pegon: تٓڮال
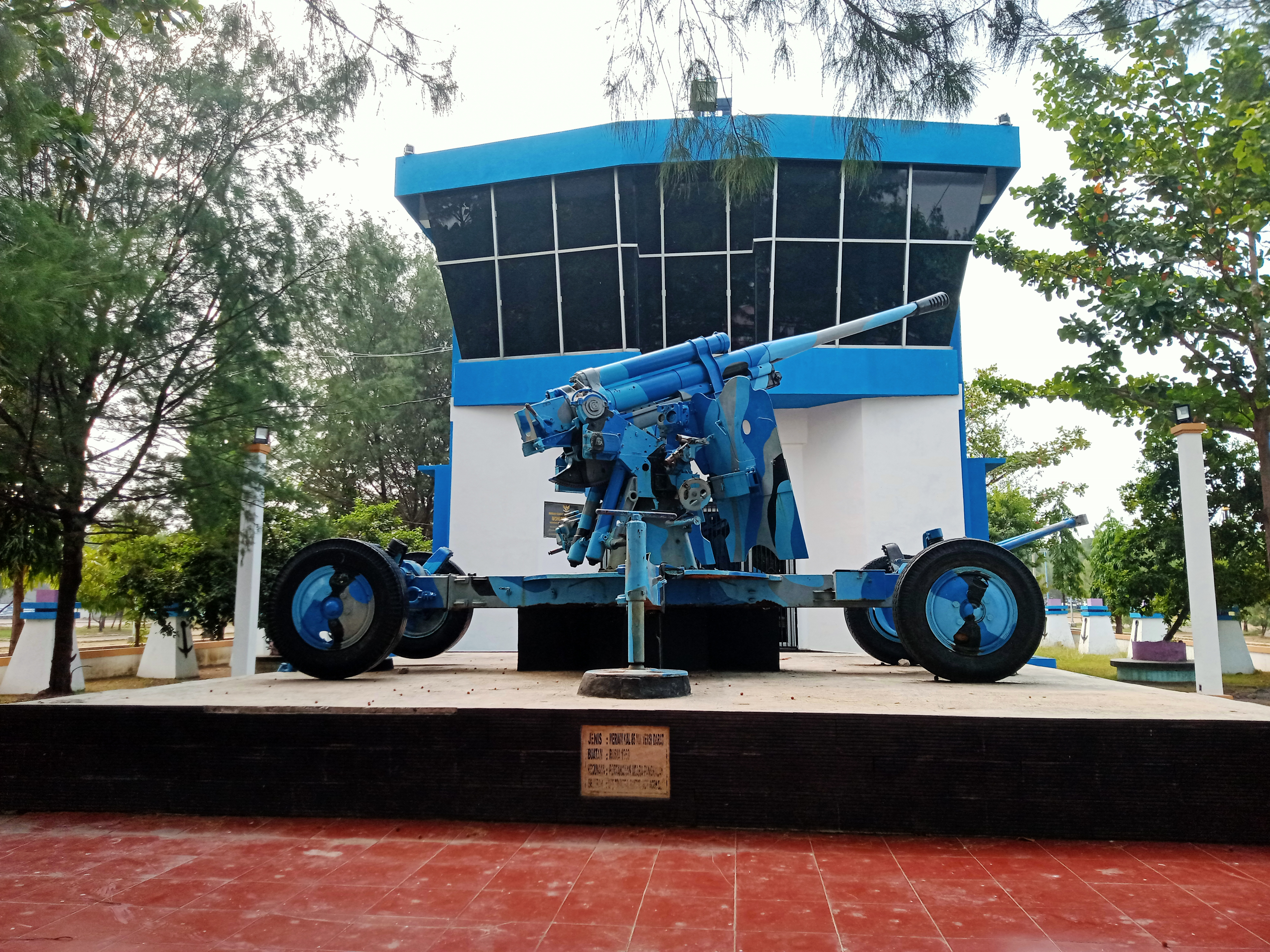
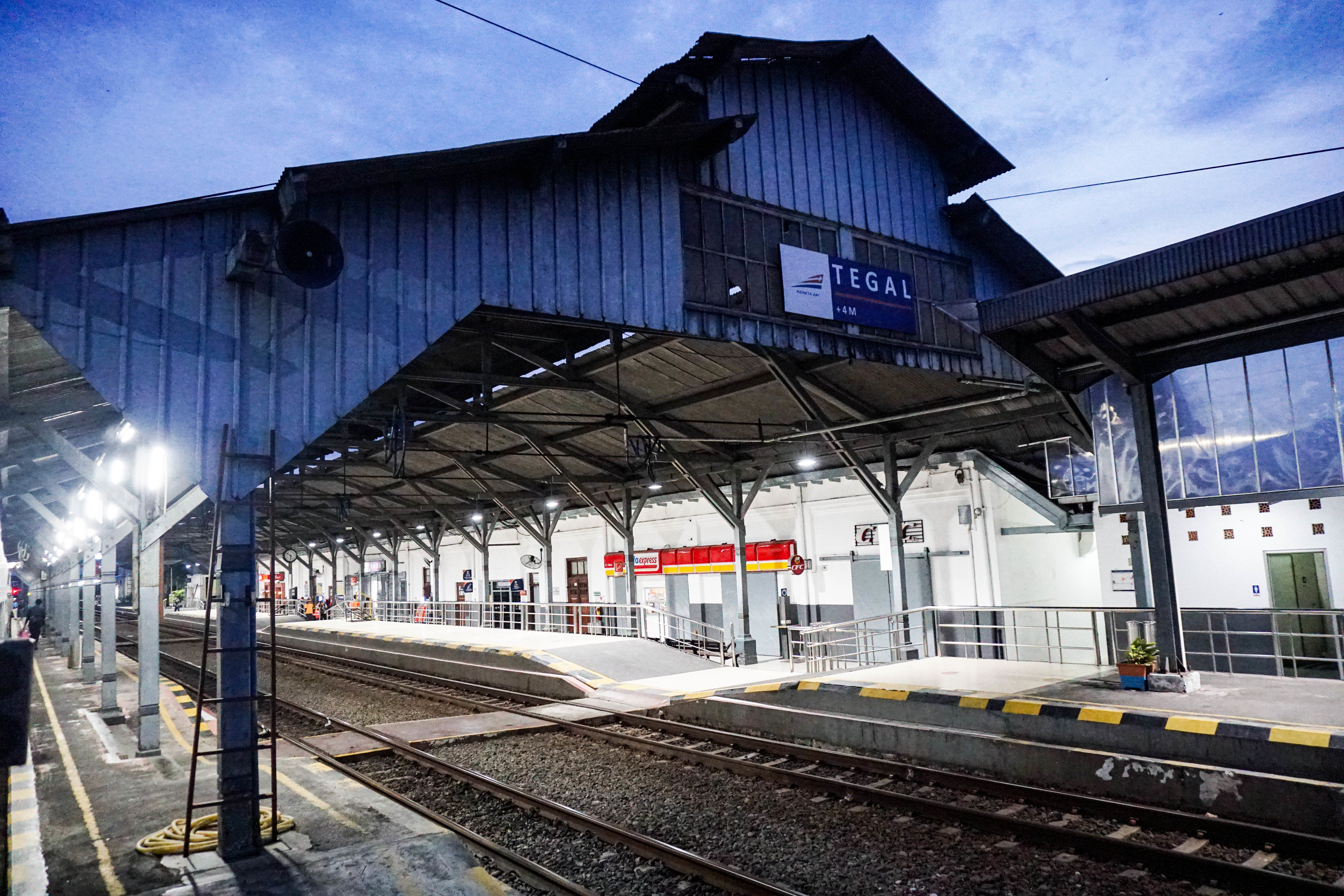
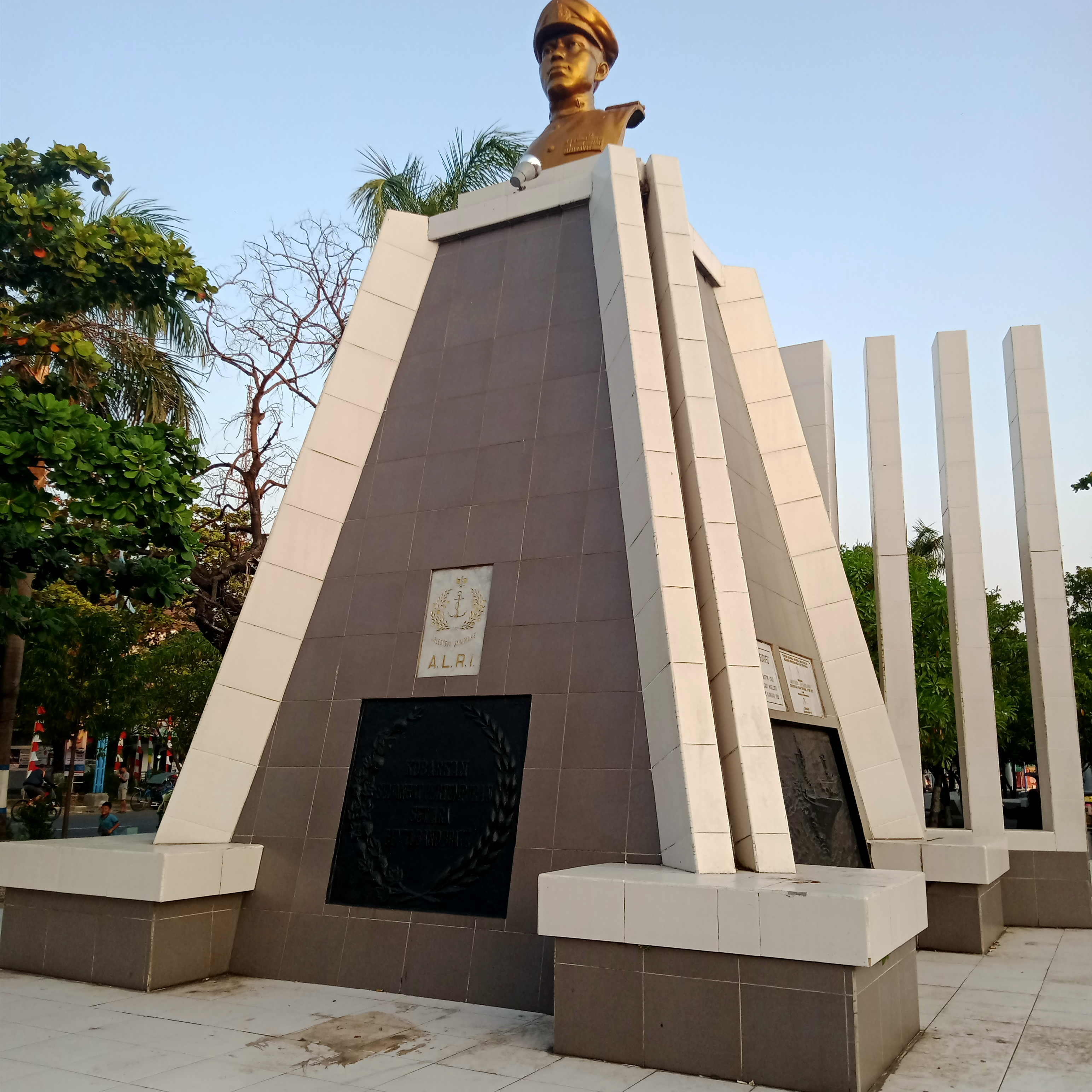
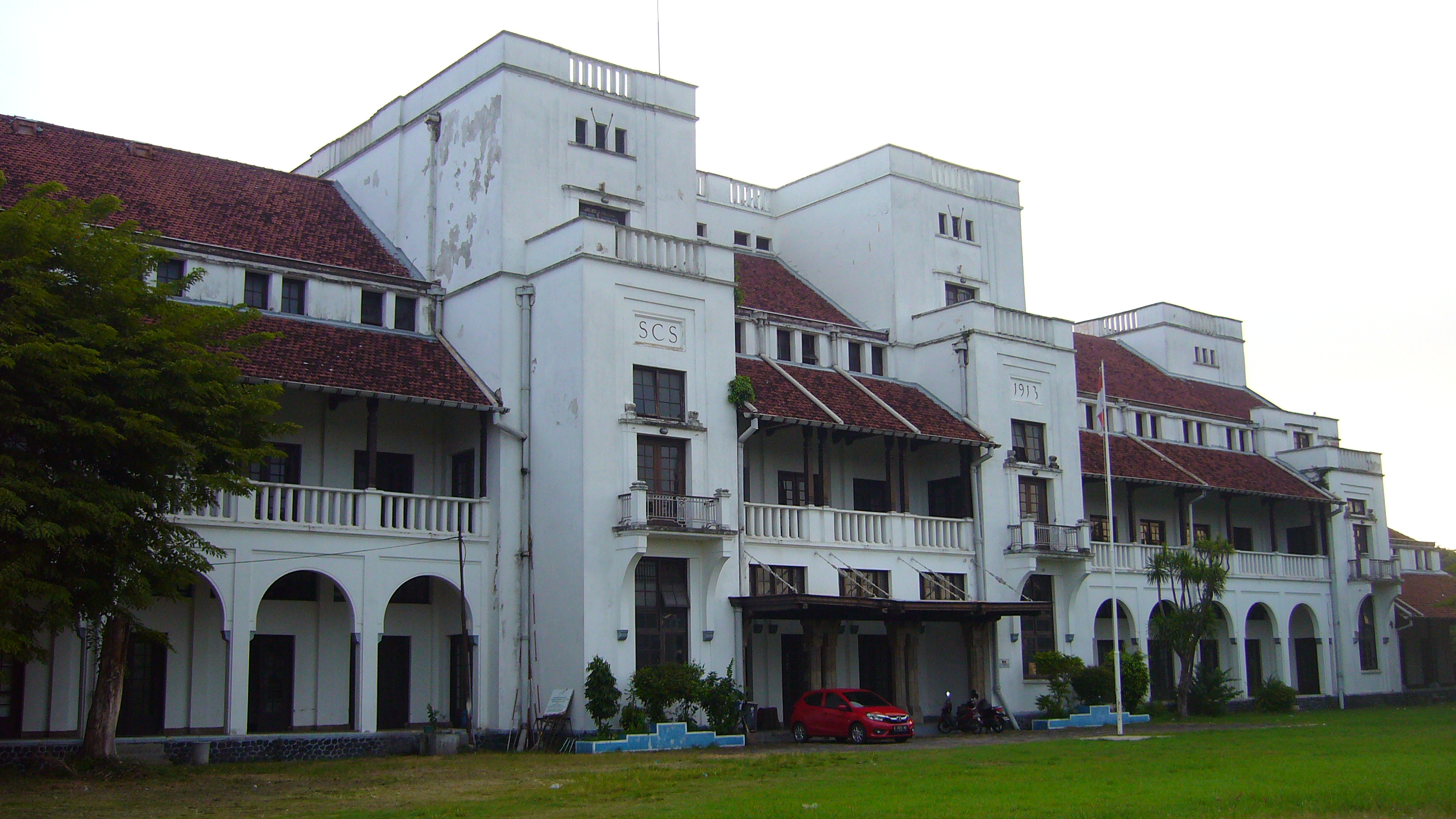
- Bahari Monument; Tegal Railway station; Monument to Yos Sudarso; Birao building

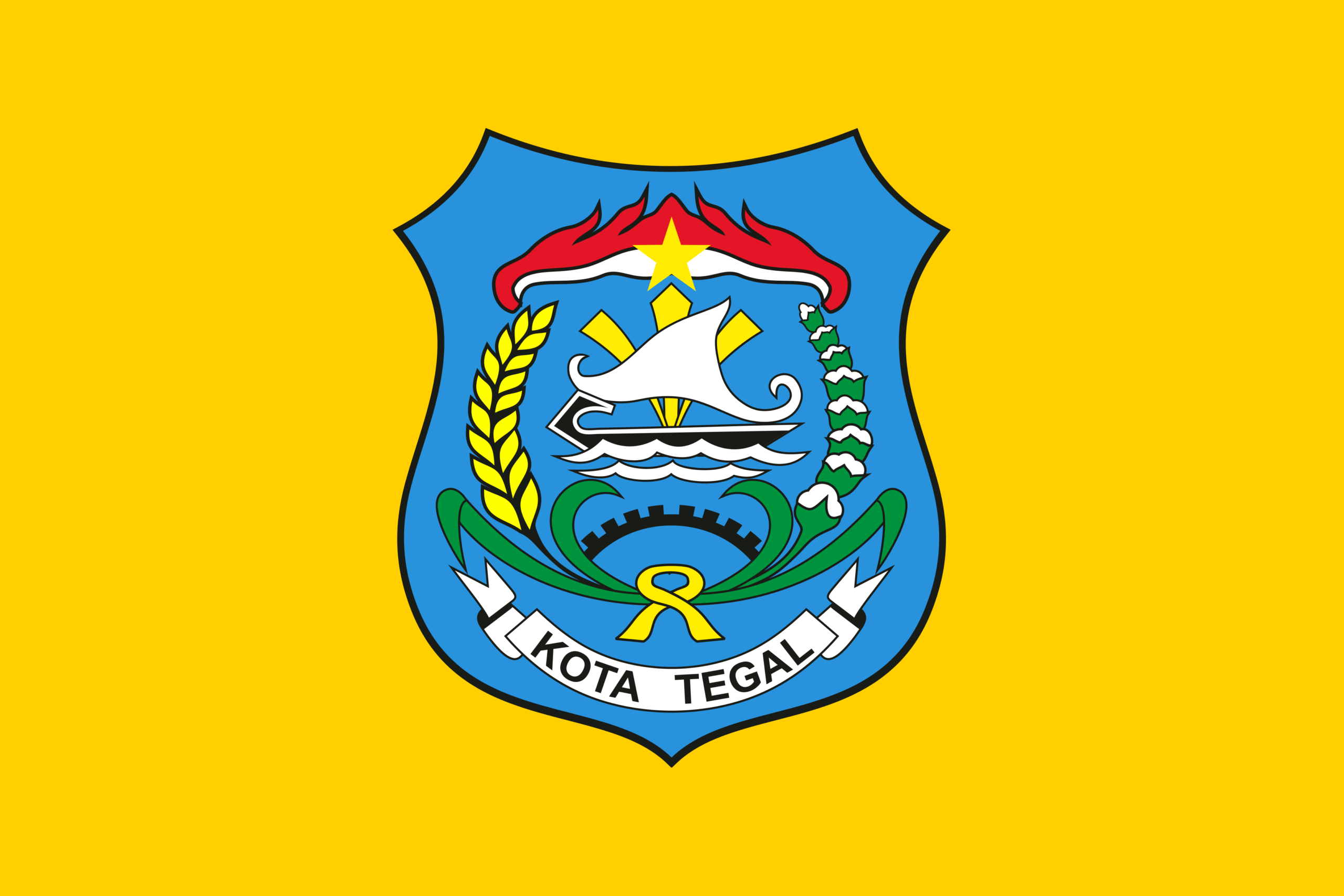
- Flag Coat of arms
- Nickname: Kota Bahari (lit. 'Maritime City')
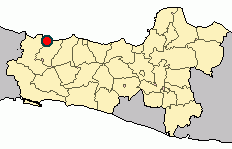
- Location within Central Java

- Location in Java and Indonesia Tegal (Indonesia)
- Coordinates: 06°52′03″S 109°08′15″E
- Country: Indonesia
- Province: Central Java

Government
  - Mayor: Dedy Yon Supriyono
  - Vice Mayor: Tazkiyatul Mutmainah

Area
  - City: 39.14 km^{2} (15.11 sq mi)
  - Metro: 502.70 km^{2} (194.09 sq mi)

Population (mid 2025 estimate)
  - City: 297,173
  - Density: 7,593/km^{2} (19,660/sq mi)
  - Metro: 1,698,092
  - Metro density: 3,377.9/km^{2} (8,748.8/sq mi)
- Time zone: UTC+7 (Indonesia Western Time)
- Area code: (+62) 283
- HDI (2024): ▲0.774 (2024); High
- Website: tegalkota.go.id

Tegal is a city in the northwest part of the province of Central Java, Indonesia. It is situated on the north coast (or pesisir) of Central Java, about 175 km (109 mi) from Semarang, the capital of the province. It had a population of 239,599 at the 2010 Census and 273,825 at the 2020 Census; the official estimate as of mid-2025 was 297,173 (comprising 149,957 males and 147,216 females).

The city is administratively separate from Tegal Regency, which borders it to the south and east; Brebes Regency borders it to the west. As originally calculated, the metropolitan area of the city and surrounding districts within Tegal Regency at the 1990 Census was 719,847 (not including 289,103 inhabitants within Brebes Regency). Its built-up (or metro) area made up of Tegal Municipality and 12 districts spread over Tegal and Brebes Regencies was home to 1,410,124 inhabitants as at the 2010 census and 1,602,546 at the 2020 Census; the official estimate as at mid 2025 was 1,698,092.

The Dutch East Indies colonial sugar industry originated in Tegal and the nearby city of Pekalongan, approximately 50 km (31 mi) to the east. Tegal Regency remained a major sugar production center until the mid-20th century. The city served as a port for exporting sugar produced on the nearby plantations. Tegal is famous for its warung, commonly called "warteg" or warung tegal. It is also known for its tea products, such as teh botol Sosro, Tong Tji tea, 2 Tang tea, Gopek tea, and other brands.

== History ==
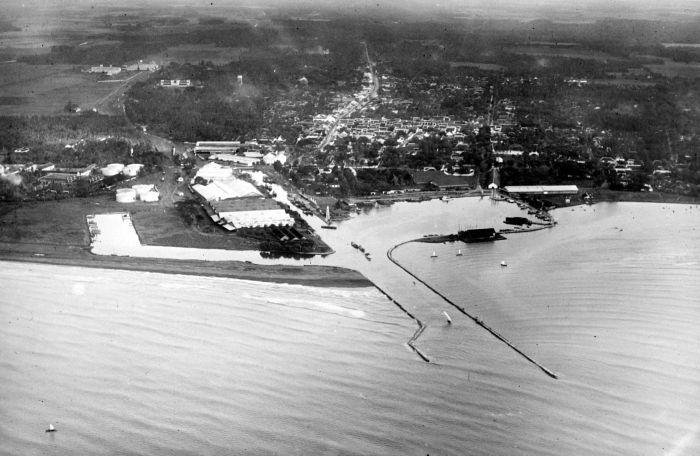
Aerial view of Tegal (date unknown)

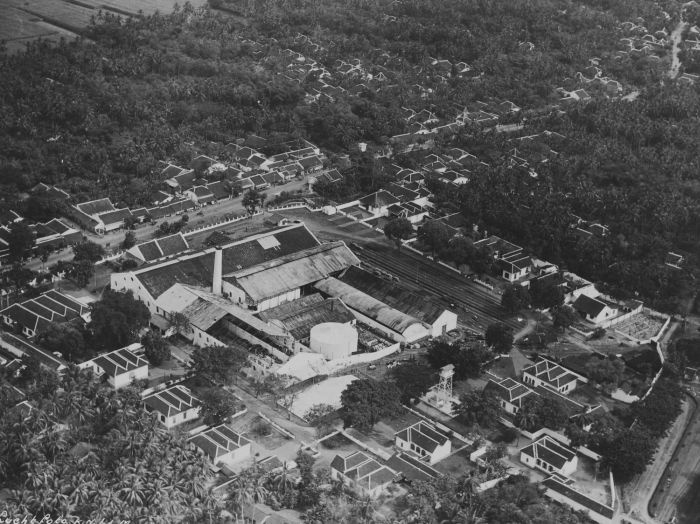
Aerial view of Pagongan sugar factory (ca.1928–40)

The city of Tegal developed from a small village called Tetegual. The modernization of the village began in the early 1530s, and it eventually became part of the Pekalongan Regency, which admitted the existence of the Pajang Empire in Central Java. The Pajang Empire was the successor of the Sultanate of Demak.

The city was founded by Ki Gede Sebayu. Together with the local people, he aspired to increase the region's agriculture, exploiting its fertile soil. Because of his efforts to develop the region, he became the high leader and the symbol of the city. His coronation as leader was held simultaneously with a traditional festival celebrating a rich agricultural harvest. By district ordinance no. 5/1988, 28 July is the anniversary of the city of Tegal.

In the 1920s, the city was a center of activism for the Communist Party of Indonesia (PKI), and the radical leaders of the Tegal branch of the PKI were among the instigators of the 1926 rebellion that led to the temporary destruction of that party.

On 8 October 1945, an anti-feudalism movement called Gerakan Tiga Daerah ("Three Regions Movement") was established in Tegal, Pekalongan, and Brebes. Its goal was to replace the blue-blood regents (related to the kings of Yogyakarta and Surakarta) with ordinary people. According to the leaders of this movement, the old regents cooperated with the Japanese during World War II and sent people to Japanese slave labor camps. The main leader of Gerakan Tiga Daerah was Sarjiyo, who became the new regent of Pekalongan. Others were Kutil, K. Mijaya and Ir. Sakirman. Ir Sakirman was the local leader of the PKI. The government of the Republic of Indonesia in Yogyakarta opposed Gerakan Tiga Daerah and declared it illegal.

Gerakan Tiga Daerah had the old regents arrested, stripped naked, and dragged into prison. Other government officials and police officers were kidnapped and massacred at Talang Bridge. The Gerakan Tiga Daerah also provoked a racial riot against ethnic Chinese in Brebes. On 4 November 1945, the movement attacked the Indonesian army headquarters and the regent office in Pekalongan. The rebels were defeated by the Indonesian army in a fierce battle on 21 December 1945, and most of their leaders were arrested and imprisoned. This rebellion is called the Three Regions Affair.

During the unrest following the resignation of President Suharto in 1998, Tegal was the site of extensive protests and occasional violence against local government officials, especially in June 1998.

Tegal has faced issues relating to political corruption. In the late 2010s, two consecutive mayors of the city – Ikmal Jaya and Siti Masitha Soeparno – were both arrested by the Corruption Eradication Commission and convicted.

== Administrative division ==
Administration of Tegal City.

Tegal Town Hall as the administrative center of Tegal City originally occupied the Resident Building on Jl. The young man who is now used for the Parliament Building Tegal City. But since 1985, the center of government moved to Pendopo Ki Gede Sebayu former Pendopo Tegal regency, in the area of Alun-alun Mangkukusuman. Colonel Laut (Ret.) Adi Winarso, S. Sos is Tegal's first native who served as mayor for two periods, 1999 – 2004 and 2004 – 2009 through an indirect election. The year 2008 marked a new history of the leadership of Tegal City, because in that year also for the first time, a mayor and deputy mayor were directly elected by the people of Tegal City. As a result, Ikmal Jaya, SE Ak, and Ali Zainal Abidin, SE won the election. They were inaugurated on 23 March 2009, by the Governor of Central Java, Bibit Waluyo. Tegal City is divided into 4 districts (kecamatan) and sub-divided into 27 administrative villages (kelurahan). The districts are listed below with their areas and their populations at the 2010 and 2020 Censuses, together with the official estimates as of mid-2025:

Kode; Wilayah	Name of District (kecamatan)	Area in km^{2}	Pop'n Census 2010	Pop'n Census 2020	Pop'n Estimate 2025	No of kelurahan
33.76.03	Tegal Selatan (South Tegal)	6.38	57,592	67,207	73,254	8
33.76.02	Tegal Timur (East Tegal)	7.26	74,106	80,707	88,397	5
33.76.01	Tegal Barat (West Tegal)	12.32	62,464	66,924	71,093	7
33.76.04	Margadana	13.30	45,437	58,987	64,429	7

The names of the component villages (kelurahan), together with their areas, their official estimates of population as at the start of 2024 and their postcodes, are as follows:

Districts	Kode Wilayah	Kelurahan	Area in km^{2}	Pop'n 2024	Post code
West Tegal	33.76.01.1001	Pesurungan Kidul	1.04	6,389	52117
West Tegal	33.76.01.1002	Debong Lor	0.49	4,627	52115
West Tegal	33.76.01.1003	Kemandungan	0.52	3,853	52114
West Tegal	33.76.01.1004	Pekauman	1.02	7,832	52125
West Tegal	33.76.01.1005	Kraton	1.20	15,907	52112
West Tegal	33.76.01.1006	Tegalsari	2.45	23,544	52111
West Tegal	33.76.01.1007	Muarareja	5.60	8,234	52117
East Tegal	33.76.02.1001	Kejambon	0.86	13,945	52124
East Tegal	33.76.02.1002	Slerok	1.41	19,237	52125
East Tegal	33.76.02.1003	Pangung	2.76	32,295	52122
East Tegal	33.76.02.1004	Mangkukusuman	0.46	5,500	52123
East Tegal	33.76.02.1005	Mintaragen	1.77	16,687	52121
South Tegal	33.76.03.1001	Kalinyamat Wetan	0.82	5,968	52136
South Tegal	33.76.03.1002	Bandung	0.68	7,002	52137
South Tegal	33.76.03.1003	Debong Kidul	0.43	6,264	52138
South Tegal	33.76.03.1004	Tunon	0.51	7,413	52135
South Tegal	33.76.03.1005	Keturen	0.77	5,491	52134
South Tegal	33.76.03.1006	Debong Kulon	0.87	5,795	52133
South Tegal	33.76.03.1007	Debong Tengah	0.90	14,708	52132
South Tegal	33.76.03.1008	Randugunting	1.39	19,591	52131
Margadana	33.76.04.1001	Kaligangsa	3.09	12,221	52147
Margadana	33.76.04.1002	Krandon	1.50	6,868	52146
Margadana	33.76.04.1003	Cabawan	1.50	6,566	52147
Margadana	33.76.04.1004	Kalinyamat Kulon	1.70	17,169	52144
Margadana	33.76.04.1005	Margadana	2.74	6,489	52143
Margadana	33.76.04.1006	Sumurpanggang	1.06	8,094	52141
Margadana	33.76.04.1007	Pesurungan Lor	1.71	6,139	52147

== Geography ==
Tegal City is located on the north coast road (pantura) of Central Java, located 165 km west of Semarang City or 329 kilometres (204 mi) east of Jakarta, and lies between 109 ° 08 '- 109 ° 10' East Longitude and 6 ° 50 '- 6 ° 53' South latitude, with an area of 39.14 square kilometres (15.11 sq mi) or approximately 3,914 hectares. Tegal City is located in the Pantura region, from the orientation map of Central Java Province located in the Western Region, with the farthest spans north to south 6.7 kilometres (4.2 mi) and west to east 9.7 kilometres (6.0 mi). Seen from a geographical location, Tegal's position is very strategic as a liaison of cross-national and regional economic paths in the Pantura region that is from west to east (Jakarta-Tegal-Semarang-Surabaya) with middle and south area Pulai Jawaa (Jakarta-Tegal-Purwokerto-Yogyakarta- Surabaya) and vice versa.

The built-up area of Tegal stretches south far beyond the administrative border, in particular to include the districts of Adiwerna, Dukuhturi and Talang in Tegal Regency, which together cover 63 km^{2} with a combined population in mid 2025 of 353,246 (i.e. more than the municipal population of the city itself).

Name of part of metropolitan area	Area in km^{2}	Pop'n census 2010	Pop'n census 2020	Pop'n estimate mid 2025
Tegal city	39.14	239,599	273,825	297,173
Tegal Regency (part ^{(a)})	259.60	789,845	897,222	947,194
Brebes Regency (part ^{(b)})	203.96	380,680	431,499	453,725
Totals	502.70	1,410,124	1,602,546	1,698,092

Notes: (a) the 9 districts of Lebaksiu, Pangkah, Slawi, Dukuhwaru, Adiwerna, Dukuhturi, Talang, Tarub and Kramat. (b) the 3 districts of Brebes, Jatibarang and Wanasari.

=== Climate ===
Tegal has a tropical monsoon climate (Am) with moderate to little rainfall from June to October and heavy to very heavy rainfall from November to May.

Climate data for Tegal (1991–2020 normals)
Month	Jan	Feb	Mar	Apr	May	Jun	Jul	Aug	Sep	Oct	Nov	Dec	Year
Mean daily maximum °C (°F)	30.6 (87.1)	30.6 (87.1)	31.5 (88.7)	31.9 (89.4)	32.1 (89.8)	31.8 (89.2)	31.7 (89.1)	31.5 (88.7)	32.3 (90.1)	32.4 (90.3)	32.2 (90.0)	31.7 (89.1)	31.7 (89.1)
Daily mean °C (°F)	27.3 (81.1)	27.1 (80.8)	27.6 (81.7)	28.2 (82.8)	28.3 (82.9)	27.8 (82.0)	27.1 (80.8)	27.1 (80.8)	27.7 (81.9)	28.3 (82.9)	28.2 (82.8)	27.7 (81.9)	27.7 (81.9)
Mean daily minimum °C (°F)	25.0 (77.0)	24.8 (76.6)	25.1 (77.2)	25.5 (77.9)	25.3 (77.5)	24.5 (76.1)	23.6 (74.5)	23.6 (74.5)	24.3 (75.7)	25.3 (77.5)	25.4 (77.7)	25.3 (77.5)	24.8 (76.6)
Average precipitation mm (inches)	323.6 (12.74)	342.2 (13.47)	254.5 (10.02)	154.1 (6.07)	99.2 (3.91)	74.3 (2.93)	42.8 (1.69)	25.3 (1.00)	31.6 (1.24)	48.1 (1.89)	119.0 (4.69)	258.7 (10.19)	1,773.4 (69.84)
Average precipitation days	18.5	16.9	14.4	10.7	7.3	4.6	4.0	2.2	2.1	4.5	8.5	15.4	109.1
Mean monthly sunshine hours	129.8	131.5	173.2	185.9	224.8	220.7	237.2	256.5	249.96	234.1	163.9	146.3	2,353.86
Source: Starlings Roost Weather

== Economy ==
Trade and services are the main sectors of the economy of Tegal City. The city became the final processing and marketing of various products from the western part of Central Java. Small and medium enterprises are quite rapid progress is the home metal industry in the area of Jl. Cempaka, and Tegalan batik handicrafts in Kalinyamat Village. To support the economic pulse, the city government of Tegal has built the Center for Promotion and Business Information (PPIB).

== Language ==
Tegal has its own language, known as Bahasa Tegal. The Tegal language has a resemblance to the language of Banyumas ("ngapak") that is in the vocabulary. However, people in Tegal are reluctant to use ngapak as a term of the language, due to their dialectical difference. People using the Tegal language include the northern part of the Tegal Regency, Tegal City, the western part of the Pemalang Regency, and the eastern part of the Brebes Regency. The first Tegal language Congress was held by the Tegal City government on 4 April 2006, at the Bahari Inn Hotel. The event which was initiated by Yono Daryono presented several figures such as SN Ratmana (cerpenis), Ki Enthus Susmono (dalang Tegal), Eko Tunas (Tegal poet), Dwi Ery Santoso (Poetry and Director). The purpose of the congress was to raise the status of the Tegalan dialect into the Tegal language. Some Indonesian comedians speak it because its accent and dialect arouse amusement. One example is the translation of the greeting phrase "How are you?" into "Kepriben kabare?".

=== Greetings ===
It is common practice for people in Tegal to call their friends "Jon", "Jack" or "Jakwir". The translation for "Daddy" is Jasak, "Mommy" is Jok, a younger brother is addressed as Yarig, and an older brother is Sahang. Many other words can only be understood by native Tegals. Bahasa Tegal also has many Arabic loan words.

== Interesting places and buildings ==
=== Places ===
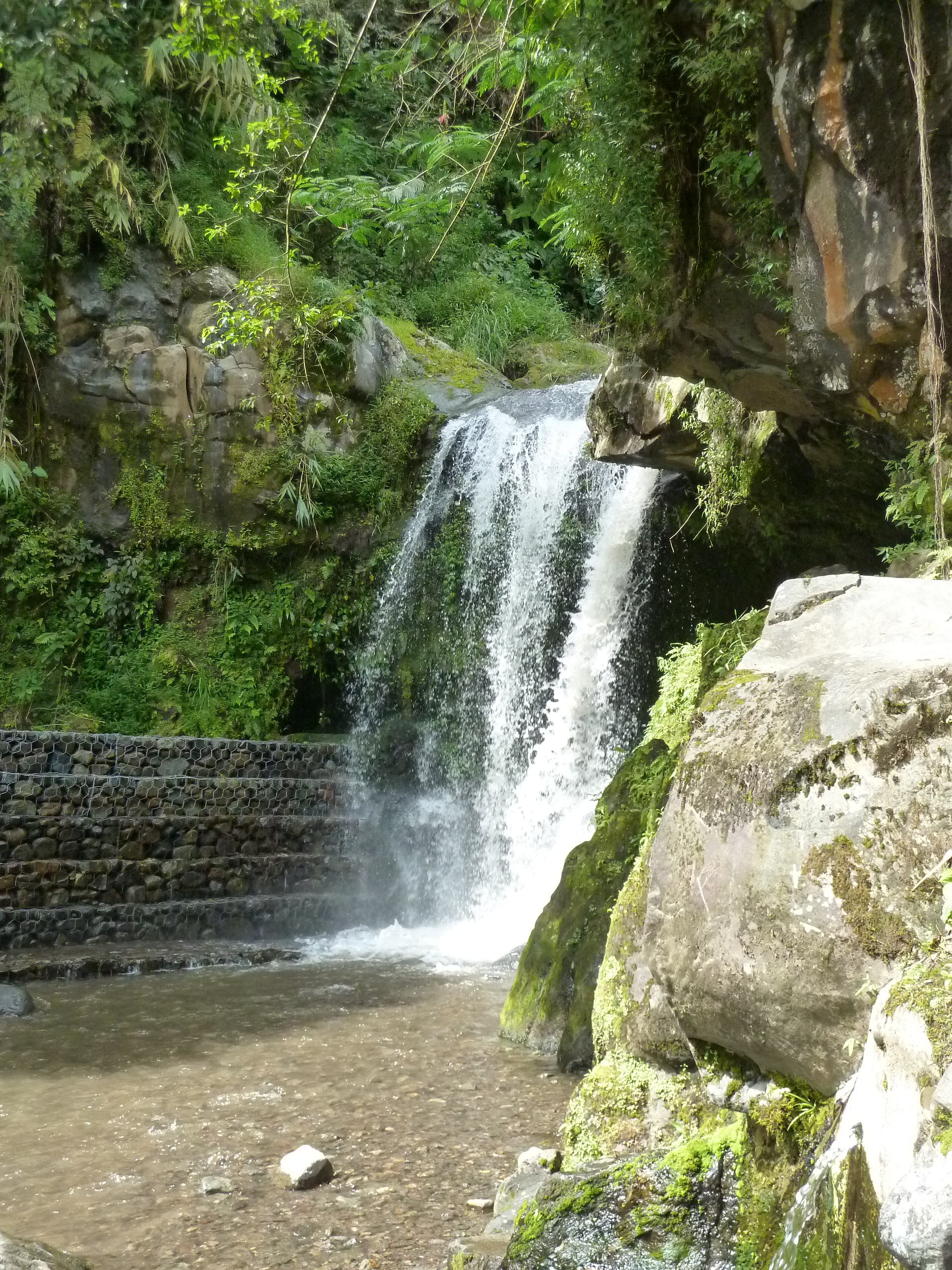
Guci Waterfall

Tegal's interesting places include:

- Gunung Guci: natural sulfur waterfalls for healing many skin diseases;
- Pantai Alam Indah (PAI): a famous beach in Tegal;
- Alun-alun Tegal: in front of Mesjid Agung Tegal mosque;
- Pasar Pagi Tegal: the biggest market in Tegal;
- Bird Market: in Pasar Senggol next to the Alun-alun area;
- Taman Poci: a small park with a children's playground and picnic area in front of the station, with kiosks selling exotic foods and Teh Poci tea;

=== Buildings ===
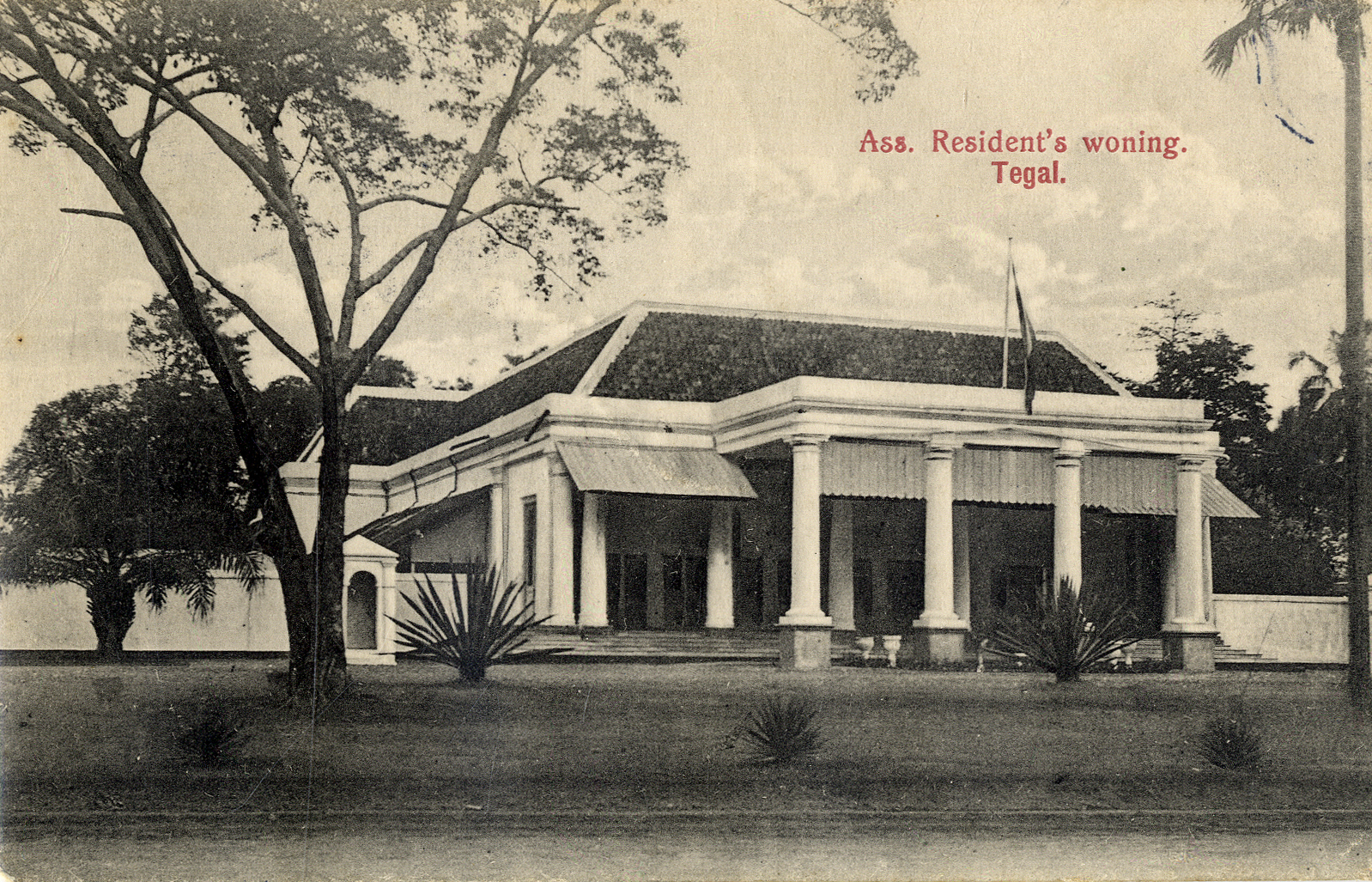
Residence of the assistant resident, c. 1910 (now the Parliament Building (Gedung DPRD Kota Tegal))

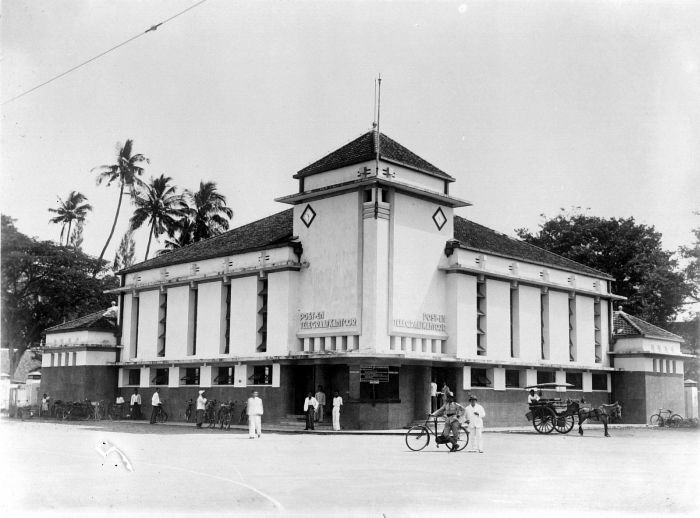
Post and telegraph office, photographed between 1910 and 1938

According to records held by the Tegal City Education and Cultural Office, a total of 36 buildings in the city have been designated as heritage buildings.

The form of the city's historical Dutch colonial architecture is a compromise between Dutch modern architecture and Indonesia's naturally humid tropical climate. The compromise is also specific and unique to Tegal: many of its colonial buildings include local traditional architectural elements.

Tegal's historic buildings include:

- Tegal railway station: connecting many other big cities in Java.
- The Dance Building (Lanal Tegal) was established in 1914.
- Stoomtram Maatschappij Semarang-Cheribon Building was established in 1913, this building was once used as a campus of Pancasakti University Tegal.
- Parliament Building (Jl. Pemuda)
- City Hall and the mayor's office (Ki Gede Sebayu No.12, Komplek Alun-alun Mangkukusuman)
- Post Office (Jl Proklamasi No.01)
- Navy Headquarters (Jl Proklamasi)
- Water Tower (Pancasila Street)
- Birao Building SCS (Jl Pancasila)
- Gedung Pancasakti University
- The Sacred Heart of Jesus Parish Catholic Church
- Temple Tek Hay Kiong (Gurami Street)

== Notable people ==
- Ahmad Muzani (b. 1968), politician
- Ikmal Jaya (b. 1973), businessman, mayor between 2009 and 2014
- Nursholeh (1957–2020), mayor between 2017 and 2019
- Suswono (b. 1959), politician
- Joseph Theodorus Suwatan (b. 1940), bishop of Manado
- Simon Santoso (b. 1985), badminton player
- Imam Tantowi (b. 1946), film director and screenwriter
- Pah Wongso (1904–1975), Chinese Indonesian social worker
- Willem Thomas de Vogel (1863–1955), colonial physician and official
