= Twin Lakes =

Twin Lake or Twin Lakes may refer to:

== Places ==
=== Canada ===
- Twin Lake (Alberta)
- Twin Lakes (Nova Scotia)
- Twin Lakes (Temagami), Ontario

=== United States ===
==== Settlements ====
- Twin Lake, Michigan
- Twin Lakes, California, Santa Cruz County
- Twin Lakes, Mono County, California
- Twin Lakes, Adams County, Colorado
- Twin Lakes, Lake County, Colorado
- Twin Lakes (North Branford, Connecticut), a neighbourhood
- Twin Lakes (Fort Lauderdale), Florida
- Twin Lakes, Georgia
- Twin Lakes, Indiana
- Twin Lakes, Iowa
- Twin Lakes, Kentucky
- Twin Lakes, Freeborn County, Minnesota
- Twin Lakes, Mahnomen County, Minnesota
- Twin Lakes, Franklin Township, Portage County, Ohio
- Twin Lakes, Oklahoma
- Twin Lakes, Washington
- Twin Lakes, Wisconsin

==== Lakes ====
- Twin Lakes (Alaska)
- Twin Lakes (Baker County, Oregon)
- Twin Lakes (Black Creek Lake, Herkimer County, New York)
- Twin Lakes (Bridgeport, California)
- Twin Lakes (El Dorado County, California)
- Twin Lakes (Mammoth Lakes, California)
- Twin Lakes (Connecticut)
- Twin Lakes (Glacier National Park) in Glacier County, Montana
- Twin Lakes (Idaho)
- Twin Lakes (Lake Wales, Florida)
- Twin Lakes (Portage County, Wisconsin)
- Twin Lakes (Whatcom County, Washington)

=== Other countries ===
- Twin Lakes (Lake Diatas and Lake Dibawah), aka Danau Kembar, West Sumatra, Indonesia
- Twinlakes Theme Park, in Melton Mowbray, Leicestershire, England

== Businesses and organizations ==
- Twin Lakes Brewing Company, an American brewing company
- Palm Beach Lakes Community High School, formerly Twin Lakes High School, in West Palm Beach, Florida, US
- Twin Lakes Secondary School, in Orillia, Ontario, Canada

== See also ==
- Twin lake-N, Intel's codename for an Alder Lake series processor
