= Twin Lakes, California (disambiguation) =

Twin Lakes, California may refer to the following in the United States:

== Settlements ==
- Twin Lakes, California, in Santa Cruz County
- Twin Lakes, Mono County, California

== Lakes ==
- Twin Lakes (El Dorado County, California) in the Desolation Wilderness
- Twin Lakes (Mammoth Lakes, California) in Mono County
- Twin Lakes (Bridgeport, California) in Mono County
