= Kembar =

Kembar is a Malay and Indonesian word meaning twin.

- Mount Kembar
- Danau Kembar - Twin Lake
  - Lake Dibawah
  - Lake Diatas
