= Joko Sutopo =

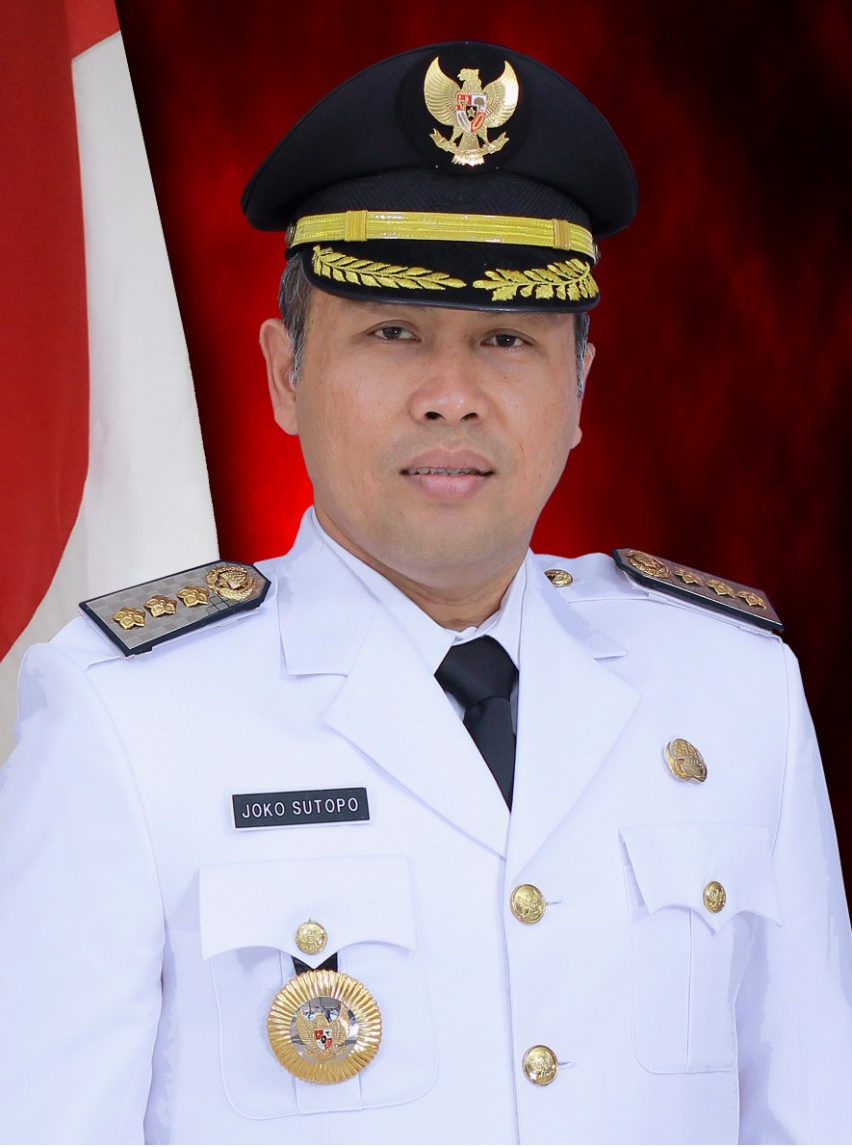

Regent of Wonogiri
- In office 26 February 2021 – 20 February 2025
- In office 17 February 2016 – 17 February 2021
- Preceded by: Danar Rahmanto
- Succeeded by: Setyo Sukarno

Personal details
- Born: 24 January 1974 (age 52) Wonogiri, Central Java, Indonesia
- Party: PDI-P

Joko Sutopo (born 24 January 1974), popularly known as Jekek, is an Indonesian politician of the Indonesian Democratic Party of Struggle who served as the regent of Wonogiri from 2016 to 2025.

== Early life ==
Joko Sutopo was born on 24 January 1974 in Wonogiri Regency. His father had died before his birth, and his mother worked as an itinerant jamu seller. Due to his mother's work, Sutopo was mostly raised by his grandparents. He studied up to the high school level, graduating in 1993.

== Career ==
Sutopo worked in the animal husbandry and the agricultural sector, and later traded in rice bran. Sutopo has been described as a former "preman" (gangster). He reported his net assets as Rp 8.84 billion (USD 520,000), including 35 plots of land within Wonogiri.

=== As regent ===
In 2015, Sutopo has become the chairman of the Indonesian Democratic Party of Struggle (PDI-P) in Wonogiri, and he ran as the party's candidate in Wonogiri's regency election. He defeated House of Representatives member Hamid Noor Yasin. He was sworn in as regent on 17 February 2016. He was reelected for a second term in the 2020 regency election, securing 484,262 votes (83.3%) with Setyo Sukarno as running mate.

As regent, Sutopo declared that his priority programs would be improving the municipal health service, increased allocation for scholarships to poor families, and road repairs. Sutopo also claimed to have eliminated around 80 percent of items in the municipal budget deemed low-priority.

His tenure as regent ended on 20 February 2025, being replaced by his deputy Setyo Sukarno.

== Personal life ==
Sutopo is married to Verawati, who worked as a government-employed veterinarian in Kulon Progo Regency. Verawati used to operate a poultry farm, and Sutopo was introduced to him as a supplier for chicken feed (rice bran) by senior PDI-P politician Bambang Wuryanto. The two has one children.
