= Twin Lakes Township, Minnesota =

Twin Lakes Township is the name of some places in the U.S. state of Minnesota:

- Twin Lakes Township, Carlton County, Minnesota
- Twin Lakes Township, Mahnomen County, Minnesota

See also

- Twin Lakes Township (disambiguation)
