= Gajah Mungkur Dam =

Coordinates: 7.897°S 110.896°E

Gajah Mungkur Reservoir
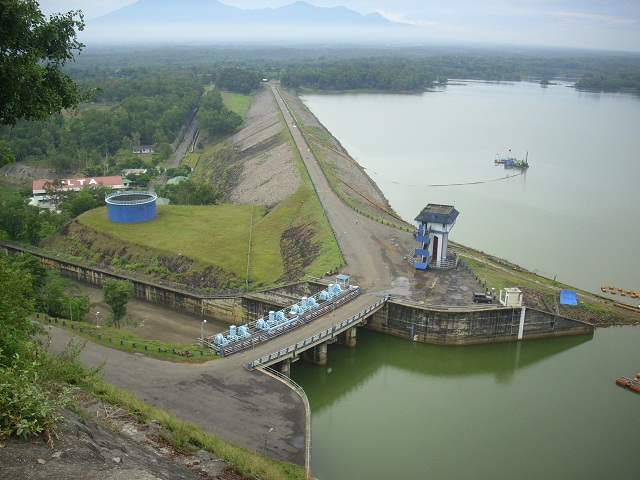
- Gajah Mungkur dam
- Country: Indonesia
- Location: Wonogiri Regency, Central Java, Indonesia
- Status: Operational
- Construction began: 1976
- Opening date: 1982

Dam and spillways
- Type of dam: Embankment, rock-fill with watertight core
- Impounds: Solo River
- Height: 40 m (131 ft)
- Length: 830 m (2,723 ft)

Reservoir
- Maximum length: 16 km (10 mi)
- Maximum width: 7.6 km (5 mi)
- Normal elevation: 162 m (531 ft)

Power Station
- Operator: PT Indonesia Power
- Commission date: 1991
- Installed capacity: 12.5 MW

Gajah Mungkur Reservoir (Dam) (Indonesian: Waduk Gajah Mungkur) is a water reservoir located at Pokohkidul in the Wonogiri Regency, Central Java, of Indonesia. It was constructed by redirecting the Bengawan Solo River, the longest in the Java Islands, which originates from The Gajah Mungkur Mountain. The maximum inundation area of Gajah Mungkur Reservoir is 8,800 hectares (producing the largest lake in Java by surface area) and covers parts of the seven administrative districts (kecamatan) of Wonogiri, Ngadirojo, Nguntoronadi, Baturetno, Giriwoyo, Eromoko, and Wuryantoro.

The reservoir is used for irrigation, hydroelectric power, source of drinking water, tourism, aquaculture, and fisheries. Various fish may be found in the water, including parrotfish, wader pari, tawes, and patin jambal.

== History ==
Initial planning for the project began in 1964, with the intention of building a flood controller for the Bengawan Solo river. The final plan was formulated between 1972 and 1974 with the help of the Japan International Cooperation Agency.

Construction required the flooding of 51 villages in six districts. Construction began in late 1976 and the project was completed in 1981. The reservoir became operational in 1982.

The reservoir was supposed to last for 100 years. However, due to the severe watershed (DAS) damage causing very high reservoir sedimentation, the reservoir is not expected to last this long.

== See also ==
- Kedung Ombo Dam
