= Gunung Sewu =

Gunung Sewu (Thousand mountains) is the name for the karst region of southern central Java that lies to the south east of Yogyakarta, south of Surakarta, and is considered a very dry and poor socio-economical region in Java. It has poor rainfall compared to the volcanic mountain areas to the north and east. Administratively most of the region is part of Gunung Kidul Regency (within the Yogyakarta province) besides Wonogiri Regency (in Central Java Province) and Pacitan Regency (in East Java Province). In 1993, the world speleologs proposed Sewu Mountains Karst Area as a world heritage. And on December 6, 2004 Sewu Mountains and South Gombong have been announced as eco-karst.

It is a region where archaeological evidence shows very early human activity

It is very popular with cavers. There are 119 caves below of about 40,000 karst cone hills in 13,000 square kilometer area. The only cave-adapted crab from Java, Sesarmoides jacobsoni (Sesarmidae), is endemic to the Gunung Sewu cave system.

== Global Geopark Network UNESCO ==
On September 19, 2015 UNESCO announced the Gunung Sewu area as part of the Global Geopark Network, following the Mount Batur area. The Gunung Sewu area stretches over 85 kilometres in 3 provinces, Yogyakarta Province, Central Java Province and East Java Province. The longest cave found in the Gunung Sewu area is 25 kilometres (Luweng Jaran) and the deepest is 200 metres (Luweng Ngepoh).
