= Grindulu River =

- Location within Java Location within Indonesia

Location
- Country: Indonesia
- Provinces: East Java

Physical characteristics
- Source: Mount Gembes
  - location: Bandar, Pacitan
  - elevation: 1,200 m (3,900 ft)
- 2nd source: Berkala River (-8.07083, 111.3125)
  - location: Tegalombo, Pacitan
  - elevation: 232 m (761 ft)
- Mouth: Teluk Pacitan, Samudra Hindia
  - location: Ploso, Pacitan
  - coordinates: 8°14′02″S 111°06′14″E
- Length: 70 km (43 mi)
- Basin size: 715 km^{2} (276 mi^{2})

Basin features
- River system: DAS Grindulu (DAS230561)
- River management: BPDAS Solo

The Grindulu River is a river in East Java, Java, Indonesia. It flows from Mount Gembes (1,200 metres above sea level), Pacitan Recency, at the border of Jeruk Village and Bangunsari Village in the Bandar District. It then flows through the Tegalombo District and the Arjosari District in the Pacitan Regency, and into the Indian Ocean at Ploso Village. Grindulu River is approximately 70 km long, flowing from the northeast to the southwest before turning south.

== Hydrology ==
The Grindulu river basin stretches through three regencies: the Pacitan Regency, the Ponorogo Regency, and the Wonogiri Regency. The basin covers an area of approximately 655,40 km^{2}. 593,8 km^{2} of the river basin (90.6%) is in the Pacitan Regency.

=== Tributary ===
Major tributaries include:

- Jelok River
- Ponggok River
- Siru River
- Asemgondok River
- Tengi River
- Ngepoh River
- Ngreco River
- Jaten River
- Plaosan River
- Sungmantung River
- Gemaharjo River
- Kapa River
- Ploso River
- Dungdowo River
- Jati River
- Pasan River
- Ngaglik River
- Pelemsengir River

== Geomorphology ==
The Grindulu watershed is primarily affected by local residents' control of dry land, which impacts the development of the surface soil conditions of the Grindulu watershed. Soil makes up 61.29% of the area around the river, with very thin solum and lithosol parent rock outcrops. This highly erosive topsoil layer impacts the high levels of sedimentation around the river.

Erosion levels around the Gindulu River watershed are very high, with at least 60 tons of soil per hectare transported annually. Erosion levels are calculated by measuring variables like soil characteristics, land use patterns, land management, and topographic conditions.

In addition to surface flow, the Gindulu River flows underground within the Pringkulu District and Donorojo District. The underground river flows through a complex system of cave passages and underground channels, resulting in limestone (karst) reef facies. The discharge from the underground river reaches 176.70 litres/second.

== Geography ==
The Gindulu River flows in the south-central region of Java, which typically has a tropical monsoon climate. The average annual temperature is around 23°C, with a high of 26°C in October and a low of 20°C in April.

The average annual rainfall is 2703 mm. Monthly rainfall reaches a high of 477 mm in January and a low of 29 mm in August.

Grindulu River

Climate chart (precipitation, max. and min. temperature)
J	F	M	A	M	J	J	A	S	O	N	D
477 24 19	331 24 22	322 23 20	212 22 18	172 25 21	189 26 20	132 25 20	29 25 20	44 27 20	89 30 21	258 27 20	447 24 22
- █ Average max. and min. temperatures in °C
- █ Precipitation totals in mm
Imperial conversion
J	F	M	A	M	J	J	A	S	O	N	D
19 75 66	13 75 72	13 73 68	8.3 72 64	6.8 77 70	7.4 79 68	5.2 77 68	1.1 77 68	1.7 81 68	3.5 86 70	10 81 68	18 75 72
- █ Average max. and min. temperatures in °F
- █ Precipitation totals in inches

== Utilization ==
The Grindulu River watershed area contains many natural resources, such as stones, sand and various types of fish. Residents along the Grindulu River utilize the river for agricultural and fishery (through traditional fishing and netting). The large water discharge of the Grindulu River is also used for traditional irrigation.

The Tukul Reservoir Dam is currently under construction on the Asemgondok River, next to the Karanggede Village in the Arjosari District. The dam has a planned capacity of 8.68M³ and is expected to irrigate 600 hectares of land and provide raw water supply at 0.35M³/second, generating 0.64 MW of electricity.
