= Twin Lakes Township =

Twin Lakes Township may refer to:

- Twin Lakes Township, Calhoun County, Iowa
- Twin Lakes Township, Carlton County, Minnesota
- Twin Lakes Township, Mahnomen County, Minnesota

== See also ==
- Twin Lakes (disambiguation)
- Twin Lake Township (disambiguation)
