= Pacitan Regency =

Regency in East Java, Indonesia

Pacitan Regency Kabupaten Pacitan
- Regency

Other transcription(s)
  - Javanese: Pacitan (Gêdrig) ڤاچيتان (Pégon) ꦥꦕꦶꦠꦤ꧀ (Hånåcåråkå)
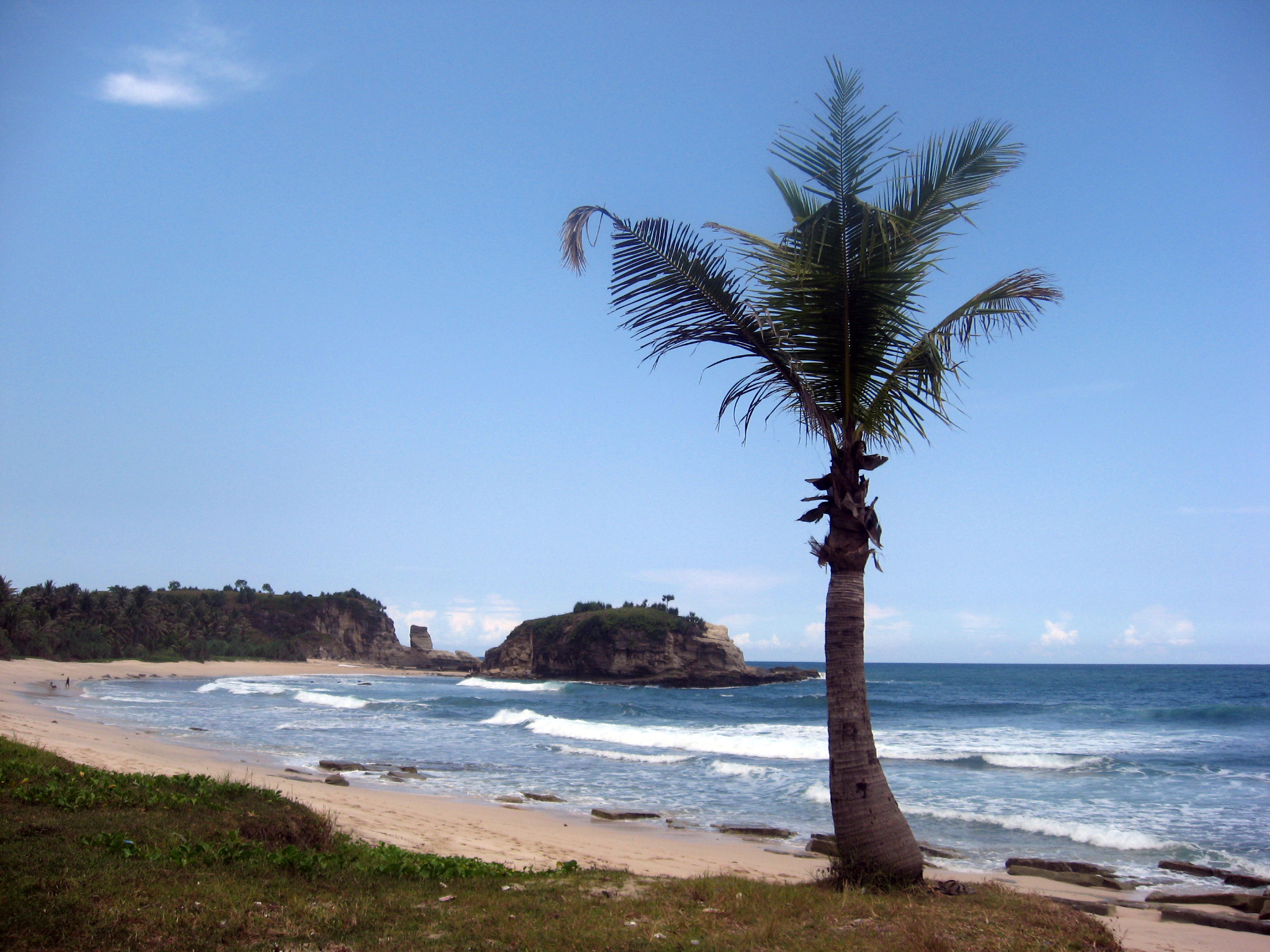
- Klayar Beach

- Coat of arms
- Motto: Tata Pramana Hargeng Praja ꦠꦠꦥꦿꦩꦤꦲꦂꦒꦼꦁꦥꦿꦗ
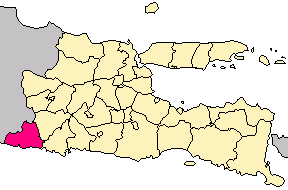
- Location in East Java

- Location in Indonesia
- Coordinates: 8°12′S 111°7′E
- Indonesia: Indonesia
- Province: East Java
- Anniversary: 19 February 1745

Government
  - Regent: Indrata Nur Bayuaji
  - Vice Regent: Gagarin Sumrambah

Area
  - Total: 1,389.90 km^{2} (536.64 sq mi)

Population (mid 2025 estimate)
  - Total: 590,076
  - Density: 424.546/km^{2} (1,099.57/sq mi)
- Website: pacitankab.go.id

Pacitan Regency (Indonesian: Kabupaten Pacitan; Javanese: ꦏꦧꦸꦥꦠꦺꦤ꧀ꦥꦕꦶꦠꦤ꧀) is a regency located in the southwestern corner of East Java Province, with Central Java Province on its western border. Located between 7.55° - 8.17°S and 110.55° - 111.25°E. The borders of Pacitan Regency are with Wonogiri Regency (Central Java Province) in the west and north, Ponorogo Regency and Trenggalek Regency (both regencies of East Java) in the east, and the Indian Ocean in the south. It covers an area of 1,389.87 km^{2} and had a population of 540,881 at the 2010 census and 586,110 at the 2020 census; the official estimate as of mid 2025 was 590,076 (comprising 295,272 males and 294,804 females). The capital of Pacitan Regency is the town of the same name. The majority of citizens in Pacitan Regency speak Javanese as their first language, while speaking Indonesian as a second language.

== Geography ==
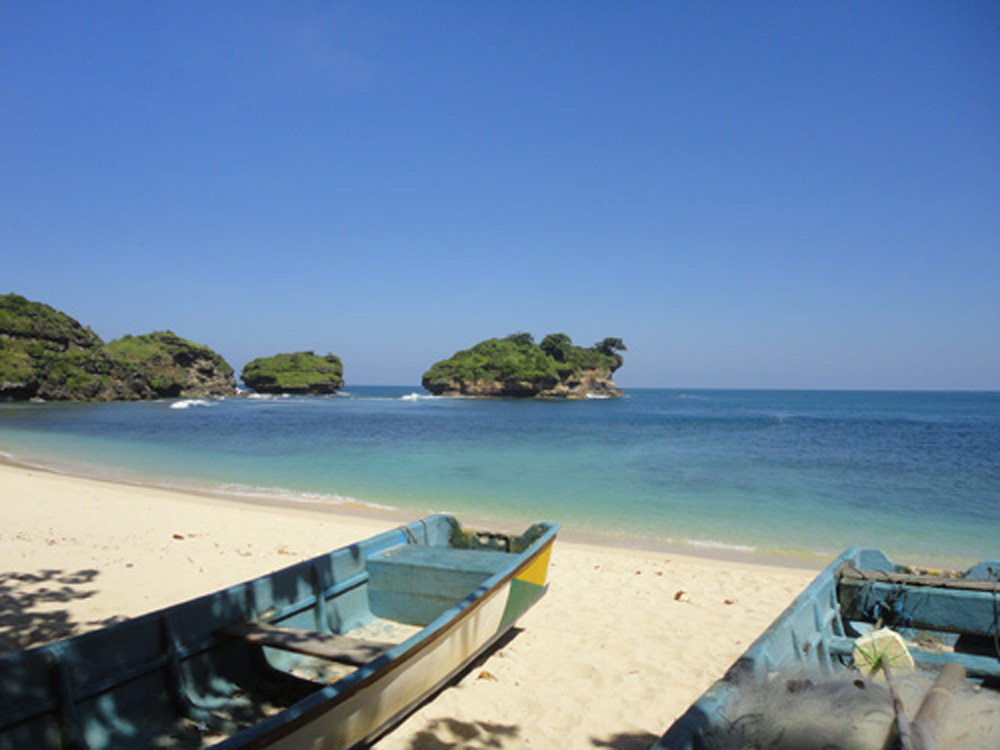
Watu Karung Beach, Pringkuku, Pacitan

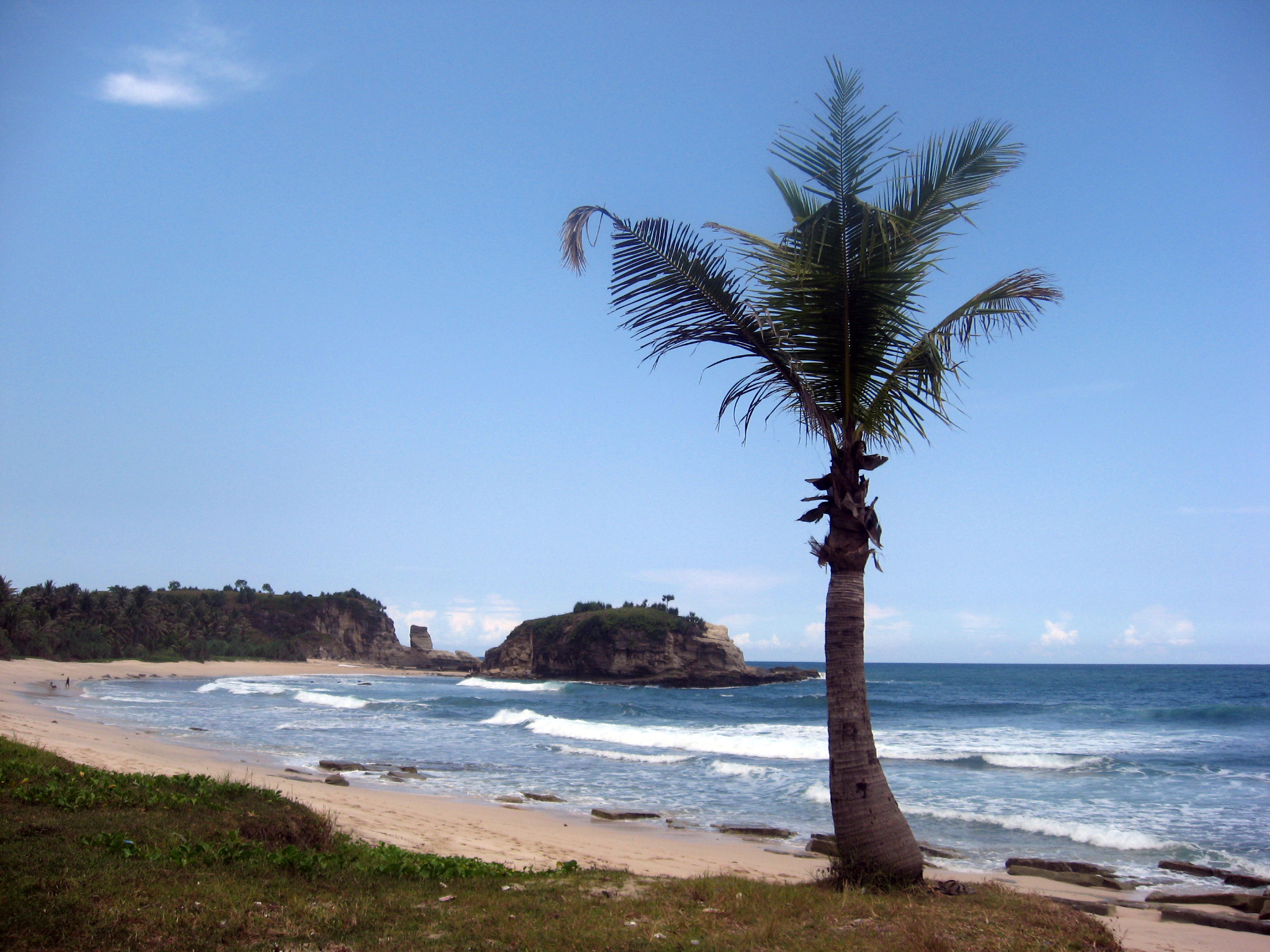
Klayar Beach, Donorojo, Pacitan

Pacitan Regency covers an area about 1,389.90 km^{2}. Approximately 88 percent of the regency consists of mountainous and rocky terrain, including several rocky canyons, as it lies within the Thousand Mountains region. The highest peaks in Pacitan Regency include Mount Lima in Kebonagung District and Mount Gembes in Bandar District, the latter forming the source of the Grindulu River.

Comparison of land types:

- Flat (0 - 5% slope) = 53.7 km^{2} (4%)
- Bumpy (6 - 10% slope) = 134.24 km^{2} (10%)
- Wavy (11 - 30% slope) = 322.18 km^{2} (24%)
- Hilly (31 - 50% slope) = 698.06 km^{2} (52%)
- Mountainous (more than 51% slope) = 134.24 km^{2} (10%)

Generally, the land in Pacitan can be divided into two categories, calcium-rich in the south, and fertile land in the north. The land consists of lithosol association, red mediterranean lithosol, tuff and volcanic compound, reddish lithosol complex, and grey alluvial, clay sediments containing many potential minerals. The minerals are feldspar, ball clay, bentonite, pyrophyllite, calcite, gypsum, phosphate rock, quartz, coal, dolomite, gemstone, tin ore, and manganite.

Pacitan Regency includes 130.87 km^{2} of rice fields and 1,211.55 km^{2} of dry land. According to irrigation types, the rice fields can be grouped into: technical irrigation rice field (16.06 km^{2}), half technical irrigation rice field (11.88 km^{2}), simple irrigation rice field (40.63 km^{2}), and rain-dependent rice field (62.3 km^{2}).

== Administrative districts ==
Pacitan Regency is divided into twelve districts (kecamatan), tabulated below with their areas and population totals at the 2010 census and the 2020 census, together with the official estimates as of mid 2025. The table also includes the locations of the district headquarters, the number of administrative villages in each district (totaling 166 rural desa and 5 urban kelurahan - the latter all in Pacitan (town) District), and its postal codes.

Kode Wilayah	Name of District (kecamatan)	Area in km^{2}	Pop'n census 2010	Pop'n census 2020	Pop'n estimate mid 2025	Admin centre	No. of villages	Post codes
35.01.01	Donorojo	109.09	34,986	37,669	37,395	Donorojo	12	63554
35.01.03	Punung	108.81	33,919	37,094	36,748	Punung	13	63553
35.01.02	Pringkuku	132.93	29,694	32,616	32,407	Ngadirejan	13	63552
35.01.04	Pacitan (town)	77.11	73,086	78,161	77,825	Sidoharjo	25 ^{(a)}	63511: 63518
35.01.05	Kebonagung	124.85	42,667	46,459	46,461	Kebonagung	19	63561
35.01.06	Arjosari	117.06	38,646	41,693	41,391	Arjosari	17	63581
35.01.07	Nawangan	124.06	46,084	51,240	52,092	Nawangan	9	63584
35.01.08	Bandar	117.34	41,789	44,493	44,911	Bandar	8	63583
35.01.09	Tegalombo	149.26	48,049	51,626	52,161	Tegalombo	11	63582
35.01.10	Tulakan	161.62	77,266	83,904	86,633	Tulakan	16	63571
35.01.11	Ngadirojo	99.91	44,707	47,306	47,650	Ngadirojo	18	63572
35.01.12	Sudimoro	71.86	29,988	33,849	34,402	Sukorejo	10	63573
	Totals	1,389.90	540,881	586,110	590,076	Pacitan	171	

Note: (a) comprises 5 urban kelurahan (Baleharjo, Pacitan, Ploso, Pucangsewu and Sidoharjo) and 20 desa.

== Beaches ==
Pacitan Regency has 17 beaches; to the west of Pacitan town are: Banyu Tibo, Buyutan, Karang Bolong, Srau, Klayar, and Watu Karung; near Pacitan town are: Pantai Teleng Ria, Tamperan Gung, Kali Uluh, and Wawaran; to the east of Pacitan town are: Pidakan, Soge, Tawang, Taman, and Kunir. All beaches are near to the 70 kilometers of South Coast Road from Wonogiri Regency to Trenggalek Regency. Soge Beach can be accessed in 30 minutes drive or by bus public transport from Pacitan town, but all beaches are relatively far from big cities such as Surabaya (7 hours) and Surakarta (4 hours), but it is closer from Yogyakarta.

== Pacitan town ==
Pacitan town forms an administrative district (kecamatan) in the centre of the regency, and constitutes an urban area on Pacitan Bay (Teluk Pacitan). It is composed of 5 urban villages (kelurahan) and 20 rural villages (desa), listed below with their populations as at mid 2023:

- Sidoharjo (9,421)
- Ploso (8,240)
- Kembang (2,758)
- Sukoharjo (1,674)
- Kayen (2,774)
- Sirnoboyo (5,017)
- Arjowinangun (3,295)
- Baleharjo (3,675)
- Bangunsari (5,408)
- Sedeng (2,979)
- Sumberharjo (1,777)
- Pucangsewu (3,624)
- Pacitan (3,549)
- Tanjungsari (3,956)
- Menadi (2,212)
- Mentoro (2,890)
- Purworejo (1,760)
- Nanggungan (2,460)
- Widoro (2,027)
- Semanten (1,535)
- Banjarsari (1,409)
- Bolosingo (1,354)
- Sambong (3,154)
- Ponggok (2,051)
- Tambakrejo (1,989)

== Tourism ==
Pacitan, often referred to as the "City of Tourism" (Kota Pariwisata) or "City of a Thousand Caves" (Kota Seribu Goa), is noted for its ecological diversity and natural attractions. Tourist attractions in Pacitan include cave explorations, surfing, hiking, visits to historical places, and bathing in natural springs. A multi-purpose sports arena is under construction.

Several limestone caves are notable. Gua Gong (Gong Cave) is frequently cited as a major tourist attraction. Gua Kalak (Kalak Cave) is traditionally believed to have been a meditation site of former president Soeharto, and Gua Tabuhan (Tabuhan Cave) is associated with Alibasyha Sentot Prawirodirjo. Gua Luweng Jaran (Luweng Jaran Cave) contains stalactites and stalagmites said to produce sounds resembling gamelan music.

Pacitan's coastline features a variety of beaches. Watu Karung Beach, Klayar Beach, Srau Beach, and Kasap Beach are known for white sand and coral formations. Teleng Ria Beach is located near the city center. Soge Beach is notable for a prominent bridge. Taman Beach hosts a turtle-conservation program, and Sidomulyo Beach offers Indonesia's longest zip line attraction. Banyu Tibo beach contains a small waterfall that flows directly into the sea. Other beaches are less documented.

== Notable people ==
Pacitan is the birthplace of the former army general and the former (and first directly elected) president of Indonesia, Susilo Bambang Yudhoyono

== See also ==
- Ngile village
