= Ngile (village) =

- Administrative village
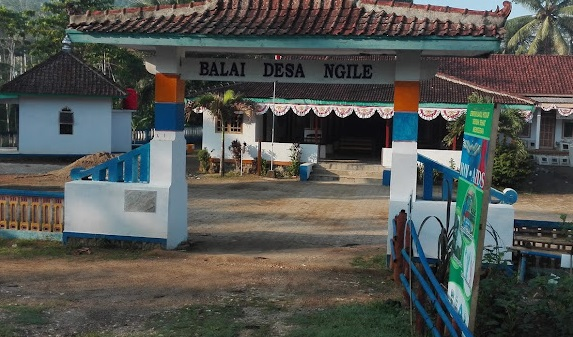
- Interactive map of Ngile
- Coordinates: 8°7′45″S 111°15′6″E
- Country: Indonesia
- Province: East Java
- Regency: Pacitan
- District: Tulakan
- Time zone: UTC+7

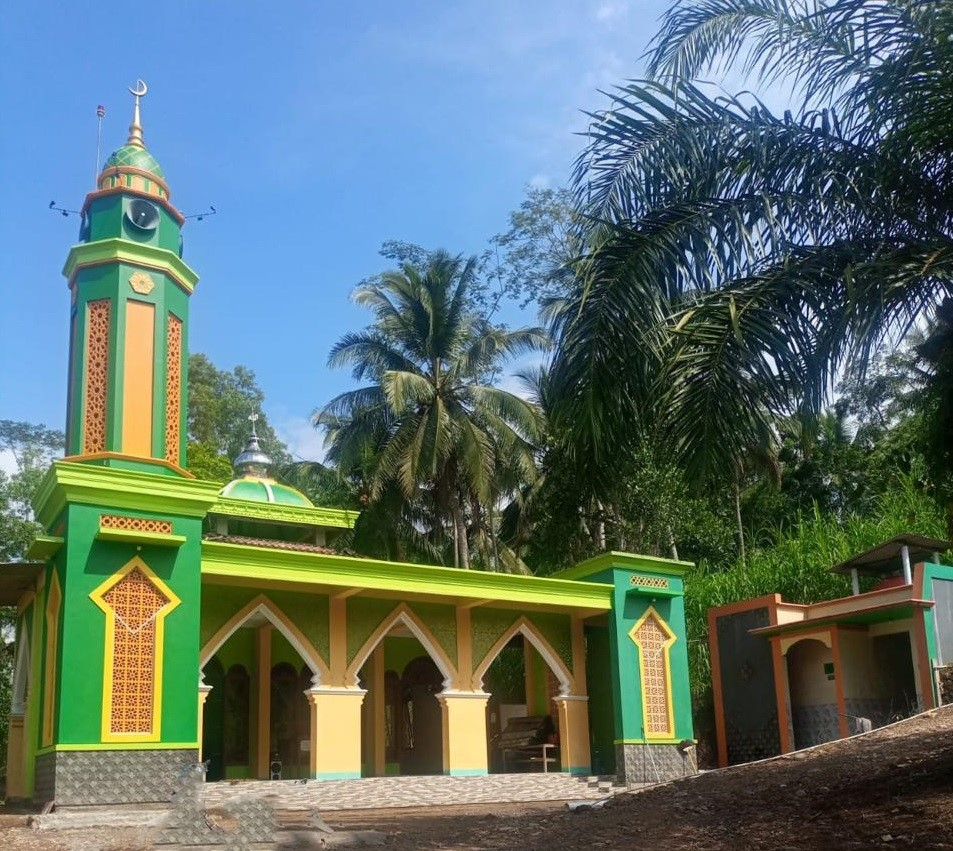
Krajan-AnNoer Mosque in the village.

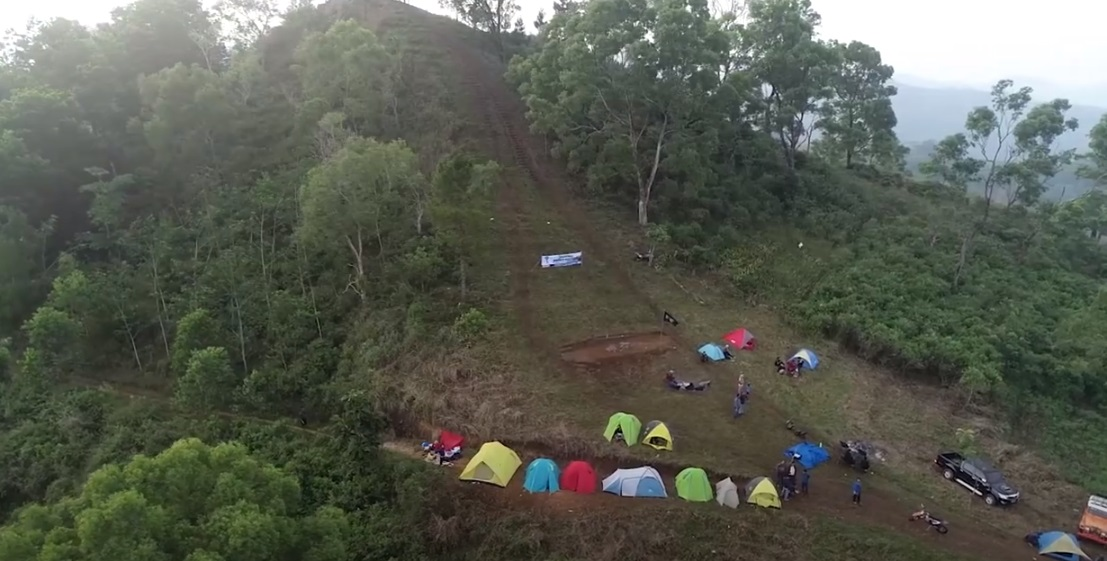
Campground in Mt. Lanang of Ngile village.

Ngile is an administrative village in the district of Tulakan, Pacitan in East Java of Indonesia. Its postal code is 63571. As most of the people in Ngile are Muslim, there are several places of worship and mosques in the village, one of which is the Krajan-AnNoer mosque. This mosque was initiated and built in the early 1900s by Kyai Haji Muh. Noer who died in 1973 and his graveyard is behind this mosque. Ngile village is primarily known for its camp-ground for local people located in Mt. Lanang (altitude of approximately 750 m).

== See also ==
- List of administrative villages of Jakarta
- List of administrative villages of East Java
