= Purwantoro =

District in Wonogiri Regency, Central Java Province, Indonesia

Coordinates: 7.8438°S 111.2680°E

- District (kecamatan)
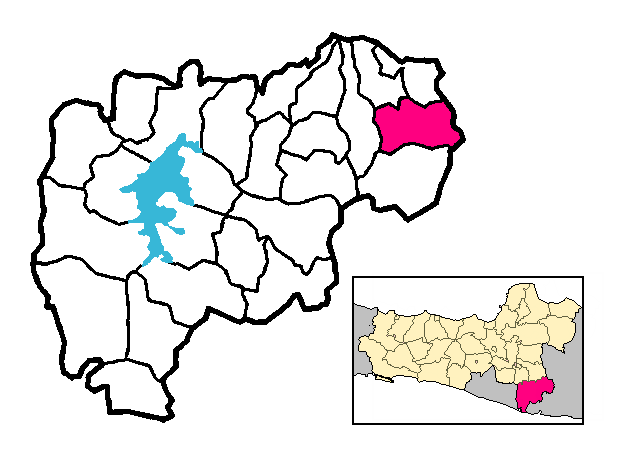
- Location of Purwantoro within Wonogiri Regency
- Interactive map of Purwantoro
- Country: Indonesia
- Province: Central Java
- Regency: Wonogiri
- Villages/Sub-districts: 13 rural villages (desa); 2 urban villages (kelurahan)

Area
  - Total: 59.53 km^{2} (22.98 sq mi)

Population (2023)
  - Total: 57,719
  - Density: 969.6/km^{2} (2,511/sq mi)

Purwantoro is one of the administrative districts (kecamatan) in Wonogiri Regency, in the southeast of Central Java Province of Indonesia. It is on the eastern border of Wonogiri Regency and is near the border between Jawa Tengah and Jawa Timur Provinces.
