= Sembukan Beach =

Beach in Central Java, Indonesia

Coordinates: 8.2042°S 110.8446°E

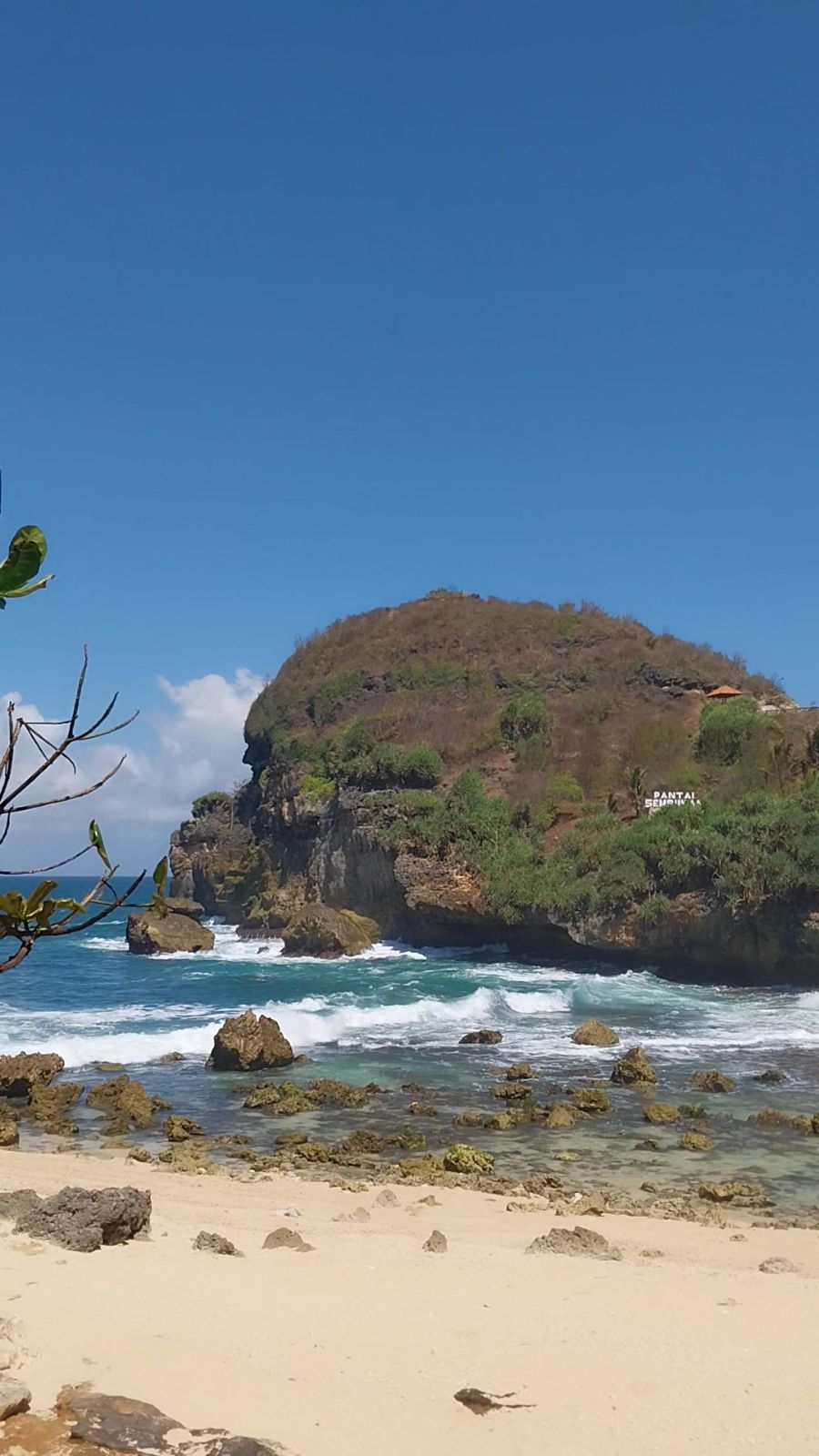
View of Sembukan Beach with its rocky coast and headland.

Sembukan Beach (/səmbukʌn/, Indonesian: Pantai Sembukan, Javanese: ꦥꦱꦶꦱꦶꦂꦱꦼꦩ꧀ꦧꦸꦏꦤ꧀, romanized: Pasisir Sembukan) is a beach located in the southern coast of Central Java, Indonesia. This beach also referred as Paranggupito Beach as it is specifically located in the Distric of Paranggupito in Wonogiri Regency. The topography of this beach mainly features headlands and rocky boulders on its coastal area. Spiritually, this beach holds a significant value for Javanese people as this beach is believed to be the meeting point of the leaders of Surakarta Sunanate and Mangkunegaran Principality with the supernatural Southern Sea Queen, Kanjeng Ratu Kencana Hadisari.

== Characteristics ==
The Sembukan Beach is one of the parts of Sewu Mountain Geopark. Geologically, this beach is surrounded by sinusoidal limestone hills. It also has steep karst cliffs and beautiful panoramic views. These cliffs are also the main habitat of native Javanese swifts. This southern coast beach is composed of limestone from the Wonosari Formation. At the bottom of the limestone cliffs, the Oyo Formation calcareous sandstones are exposed. The steep slope that separates land and sea is a downward fault escarpment trending almost west-to-east. The southern block which is the hanging-wall collapsed into the deep sea.

== Access and facilities ==
Sembukan Beach is located in Paranggupito District, about ±46 kilometers from downtown Wonogiri to the Southern Coast of Java with a travel time of roughly between 50 to 75 minutes by motorcycles or cars. As is the case with the other southern coasts of Java, the shoreline of the Sembukan is in an area of steep coral and limestone hills. The main attractions of this beach may include boulders, rocks, steep cliffs, and big waves. The view of this beach is beautiful to be enjoyed from the top of the hills. Hundreds of stairs are made up the hill, making it easier for visitors to climb to the top of the hill. Surfing and swimming aren't allowed most of the time due to its huge wave and rugged coastal feature. There are several food shops, toilets, and prayer room near this beach.

== Spiritual significance ==
According to Javanese tradition from Surakarta Sunanate and Mangkunegaran Principality, this beach holds a significant value as a meeting point of several leaders of both Surakarta and Mangkunegaran with the supernatural Queen of Southern Sea, Kanjeng Ratu Kencana Hadisari or commonly known as Nyi Roro Kidul. This beach is also believed to be one of the 13 spiritual gate to the Palace of Nyi Roro Kidul. Also, due to its spiritual significance, the local elders together with the cultural representatives of Surakarta Sunanate and Mangkunegaran Principality usually hold an annual tradition called Labuhan Agung Sembukan which is conducted every 1st of Suro (1 Muharram of Islamic calendar) or New Year's day of Javanese calendar) where offerings such as crops and livestock are floated away to the open sea as a manifestation of gratitude to the nature.

== Gallery ==
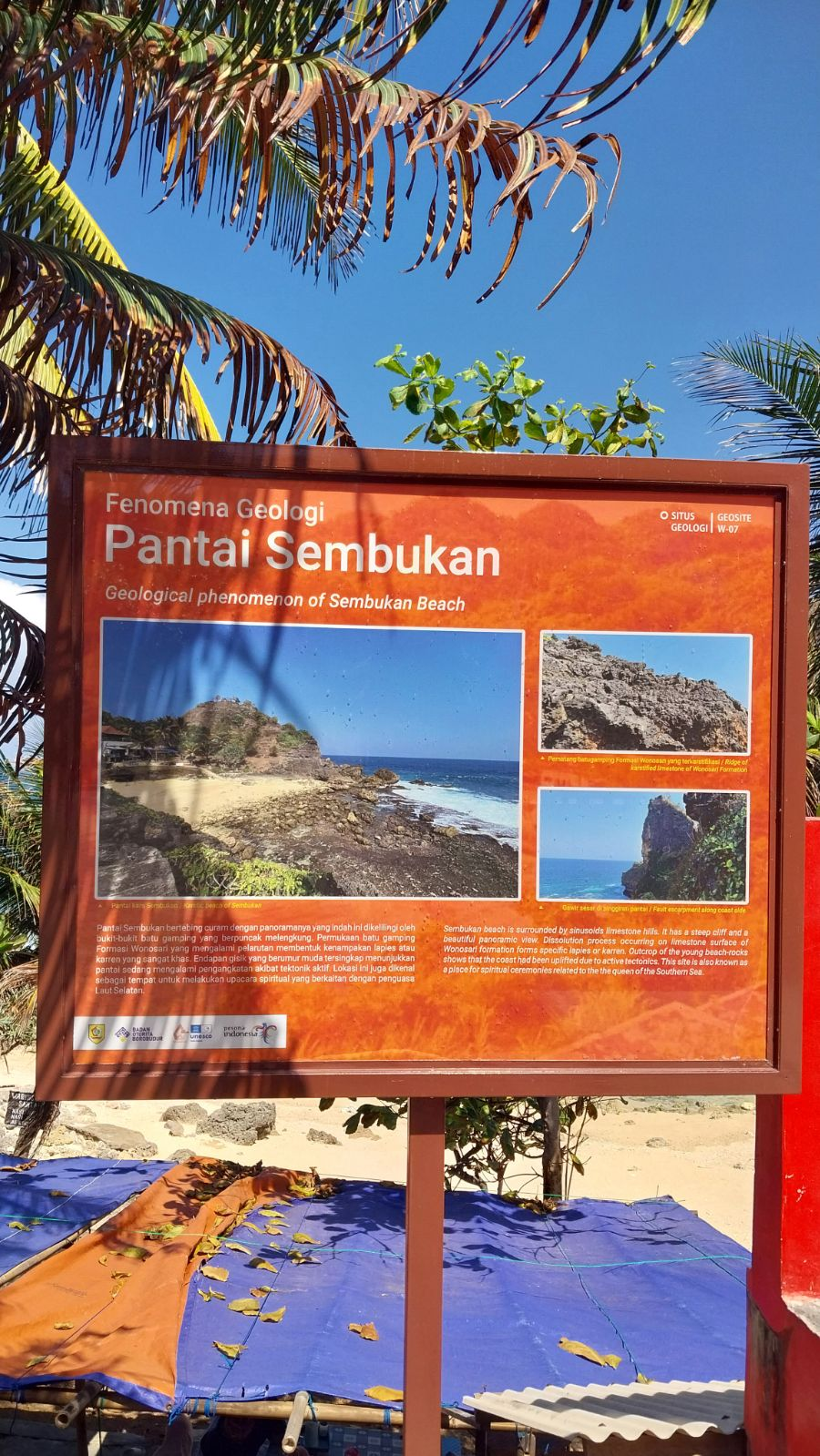
Infographics containing the profile of Sembukan Beach

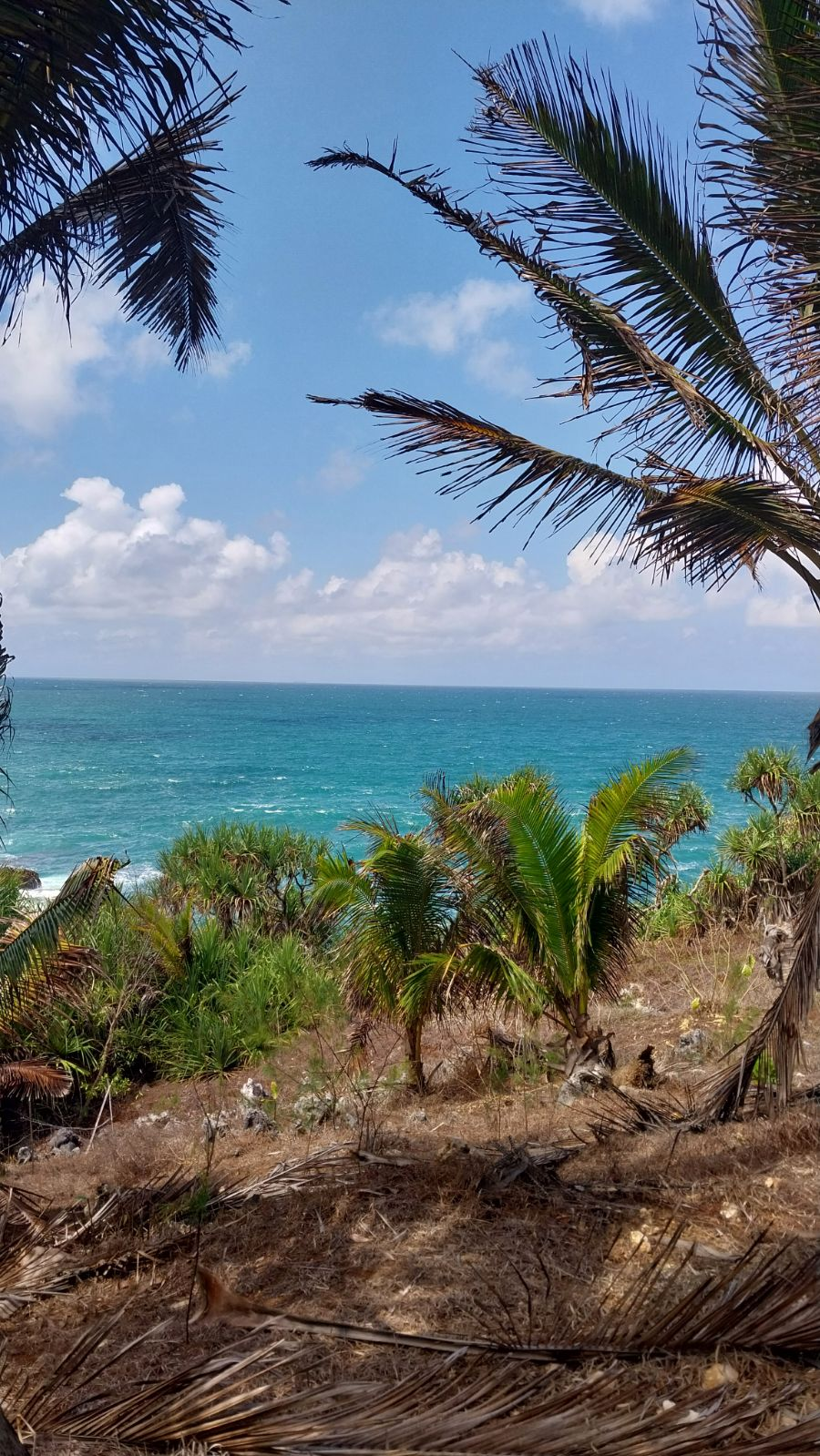
The view from a hill in Sembukan Beach

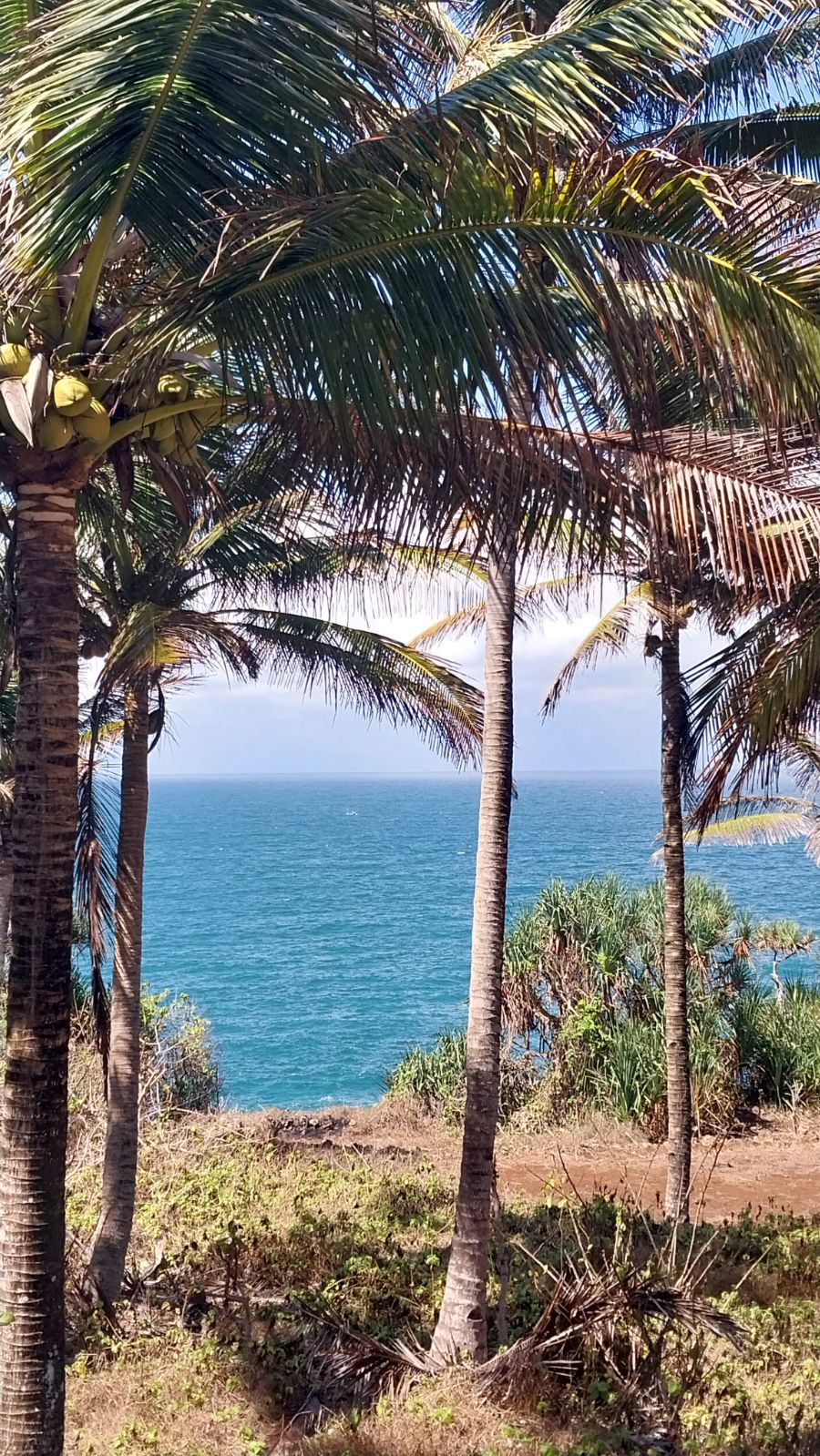
The view from the downhill main road to the beach

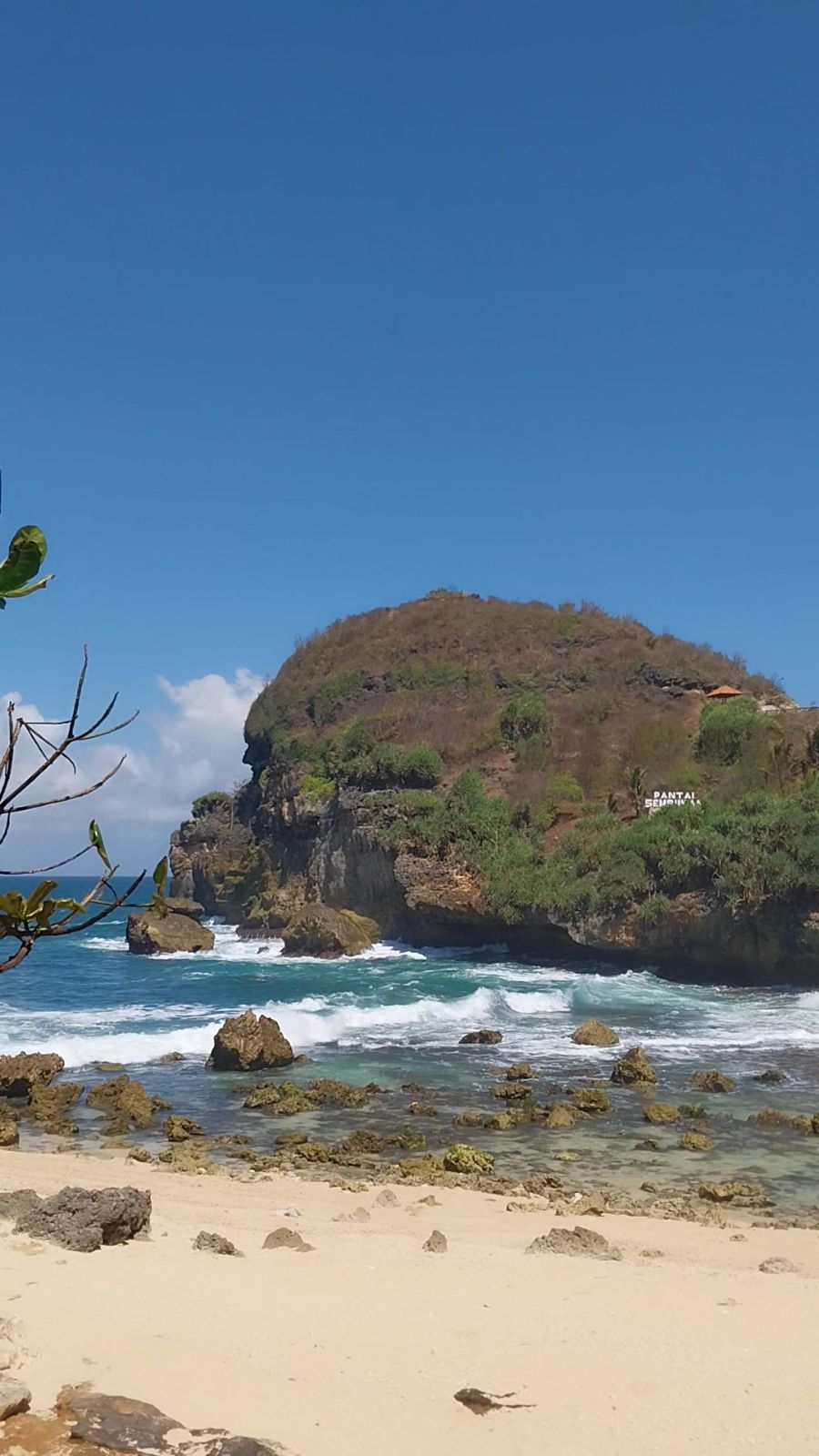
The view of Sembukan beach wih its boulders and headland

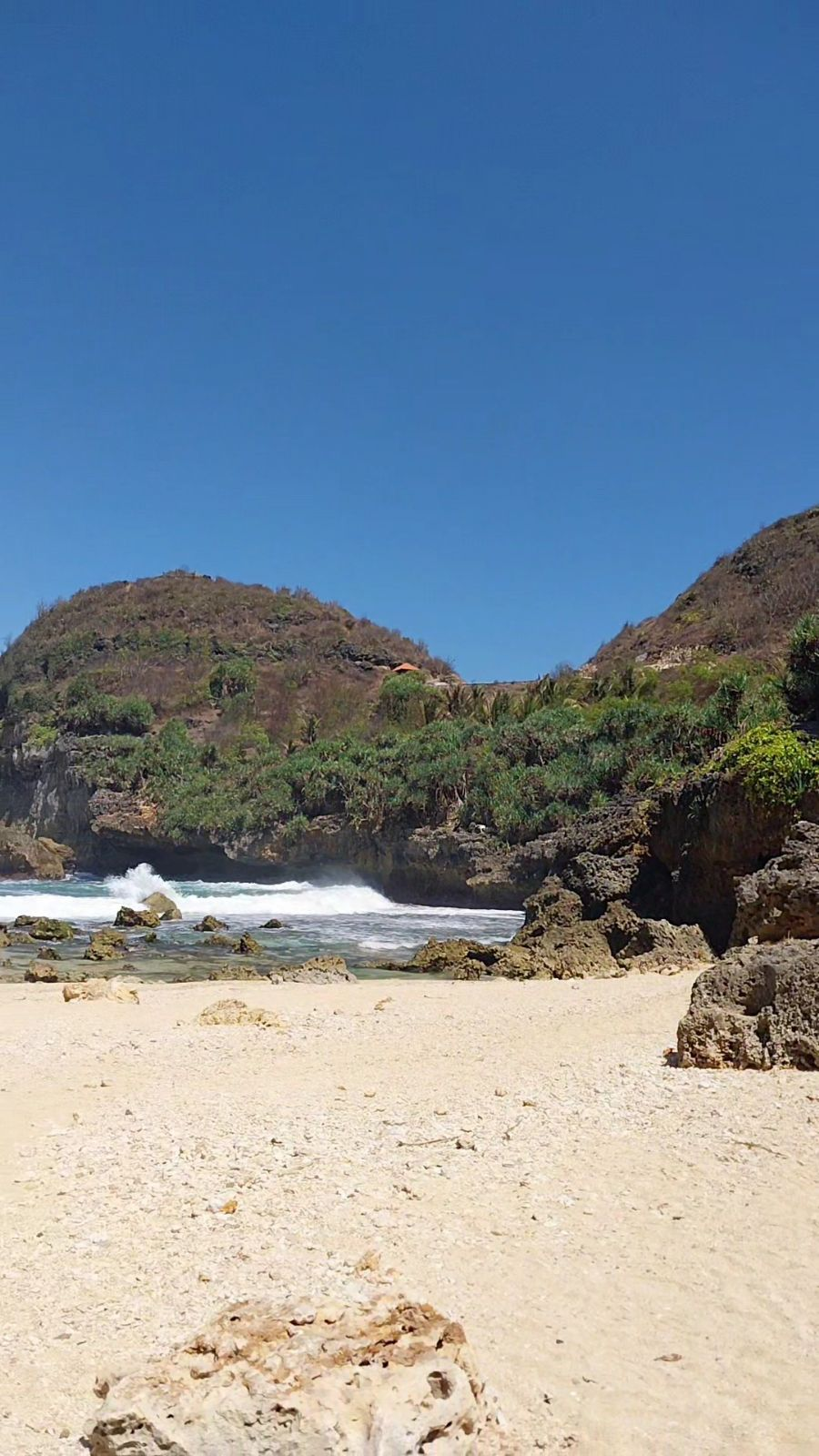
The view of Sembukan beach and its limestone hills
