= Setyo Sukarno =

Indonesian politician (born 1966)

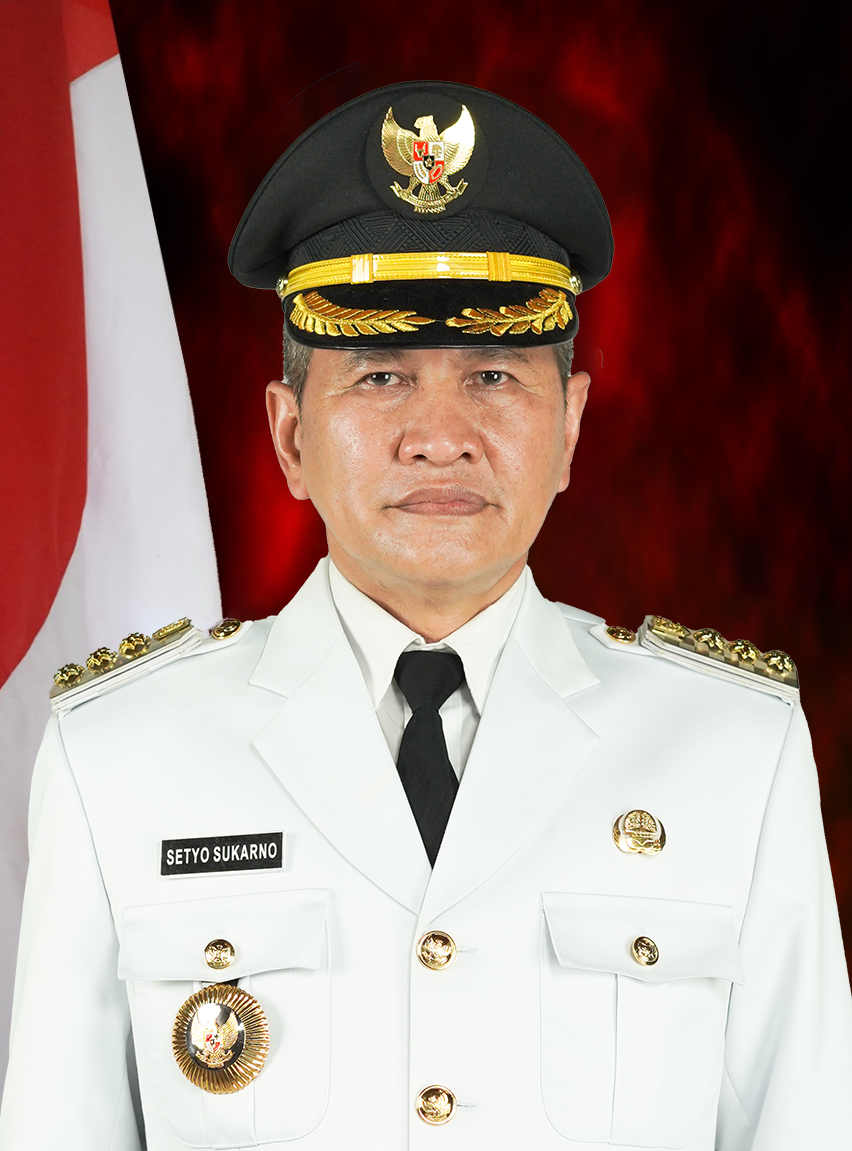

Regent of Wonogiri
- Incumbent
- Assumed office 20 February 2025
- Preceded by: Joko Sutopo

Vice Regent of Wonogiri
- In office 26 February 2021 – 20 February 2025
- Regent: Joko Sutopo
- Preceded by: Edy Santosa
- Succeeded by: Imron Rizkyarno

Personal details
- Born: 6 August 1966 (age 60) Wonogiri, Central Java, Indonesia
- Party: PDI-P
- Education: Diponegoro University

Setyo Sukarno (born 6 August 1966) is an Indonesian politician of the Indonesian Democratic Party of Struggle who has served as the regent of Wonogiri since February 2025. He had previously served as Wonogiri's vice-regent from 2021 to 2025 and was a member of the regional legislature from 1999 to 2021, including as its speaker from 2014–2021.

== Early life ==
Setyo Sukarno was born on 6 August 1966 in Baturetno, in Wonogiri Regency. His father was a civil servant and a member of a political party, though according to Sukarno, his father's candidacy was not a serious effort. After completing elementary and middle school in Wonogiri, he studied at a high school in Surakarta, graduating in 1985 before enrolling for a diploma in mechanical engineering at Diponegoro University. He received his diploma in 1990. During his time in Surakarta, Sukarno had taken part in a campaign for the Indonesian Democratic Party.

== Career ==
After completing his studies, Sukarno worked as a teacher at a private technical school (Sekolah Menengah Kejuruan) in his home village of Baturetno. He worked there between 1992 and 1999, largely teaching mechanical engineering-related topics and associated practical courses. In 1998, Sukarno decided to enter politics and joined the Indonesian Democratic Party of Struggle (PDI-P), initially joining the party's local branch in Baturetno village. By the following year, he had been promoted to the party's head in Baturetno district.

In 1999, Sukarno was elected to Wonogiri's Regional House of Representatives (DPRD). He was subsequently reelected in 2004, 2009, 2014, and 2019. Following his reelections in 2014 and 2019, he was elected as DPRD speaker. During this period, he was part of PDI-P's party structure in Wonogiri as its secretary.

Sukarno was selected as the running mate for the reelection run for Wonogiri's regent Joko Sutopo in the 2020 local election, after the previous candidate resigned due to health problems. Sutopo and Sukarno won the election with 484,262 votes (83.3%) and were sworn in on 26 February 2021.

=== As regent ===
For the 2024 regency election, Sukarno ran as a regent candidate with the endorsement of PDI-P, Gerindra, Nasdem, and PAN. His running mate was 28-year-old Gerindra municipal legislator Imron Rizkyarno. Sukarno and Rizkyarno proceeded to win the election after securing 308,045 votes (55%), and they were sworn in on 20 February 2025.

In 2026, he voiced his opposition to an ongoing proposal in the central government to switch regency elections from direct voting to indirect voting by the DPRD.

== Personal life ==
Sukarno is married to Sri Rahayuningsih, and the couple has two children. On 27 January 2026, he received a Kanjeng Raden Tumenggung nobility title from the Mangkunegaran.
