= List of lakes of Indonesia =

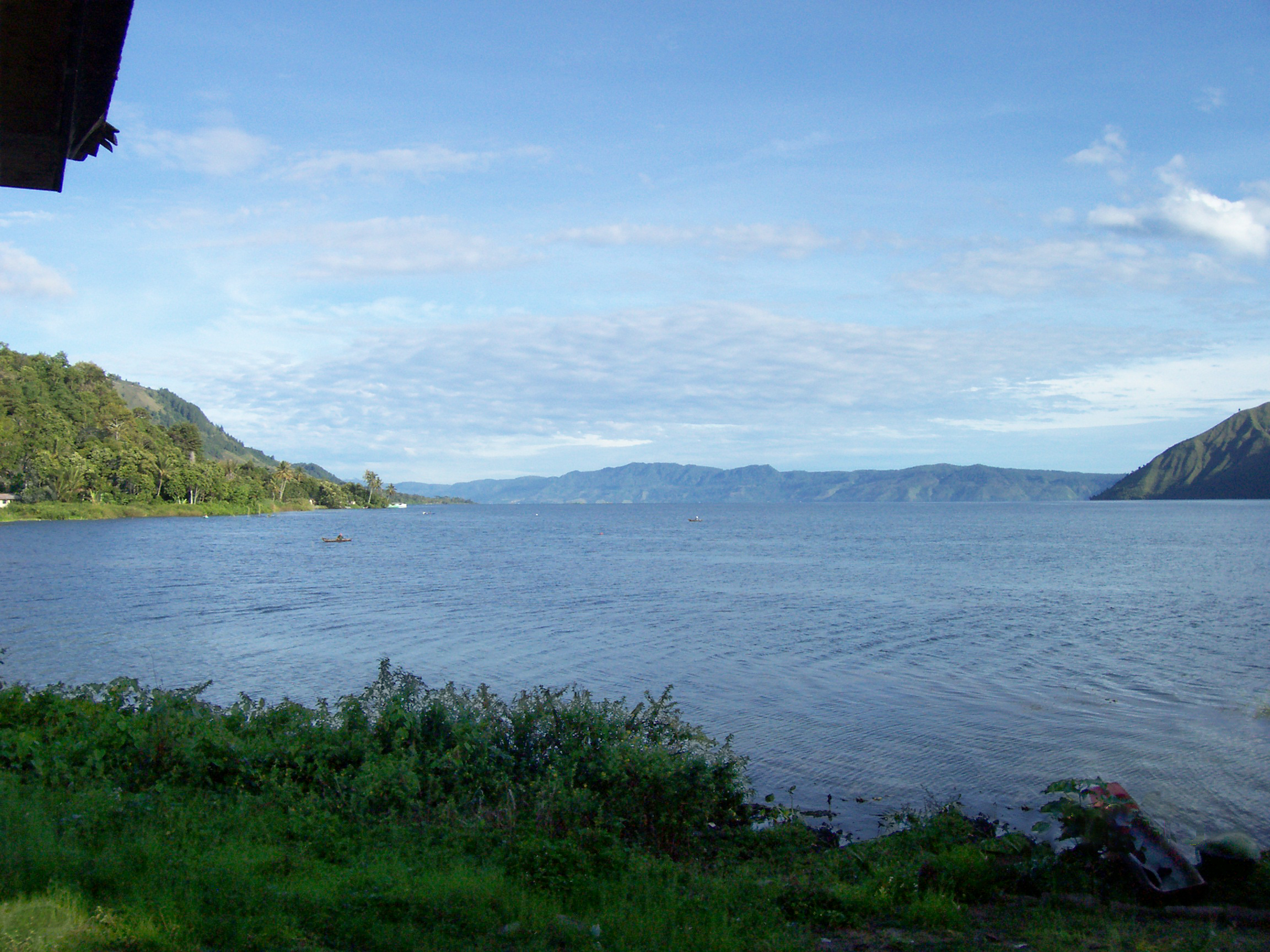
Lake Toba, the world's largest volcanic lake and the largest lake in Southeast Asia, is in Indonesia

This is a list of the notable lakes of Indonesia. Indonesia has 521 natural lakes and over 100 reservoirs, covering approximately 21,000 km^{2}. The total volume of water held is approximately 500 km^{3}. The largest lake, by both area and volume, is Lake Toba in Sumatra. It holds 240 km^{3} of freshwater, and is the largest lake volume in Southeast Asia.

Indonesia has 3 of the 20 deepest lakes in the world - Lake Matano in Sulawesi (590 m), Lake Toba in Sumatra (505 m), and Lake Poso in Sulawesi (450 m). The only lake in Indonesia having a cryptodepression (the bottom of the lake is below sea level) is Lake Matano.

The lakes and reservoirs supply water for personal and commercial uses, and support economic activities like fisheries, hydropower, irrigation, transport, and recreation. They assist in preventing floods, and are important ecological entities.

== Sumatra ==
Name	Type	Elevation (m)	Area (km^{2})	Max-depth (m)	Volume (km^{3})
Lake Laut Tawar	Tectonic	1,100	70	80	-
Lake Toba	Volcanic/ tectonic	905	1,130	529	240
Lake Maninjau	Caldera	459	97.9	169	10.4
Lake Diatas	Tectonic	1,531	12.3	44	-
Lake Dibawah	Tectonic	1,462	11.2	309	-
Lake Singkarak	Tectonic	362	107.8	268	16.1
Lake Gunung Tujuh	Caldera	1,950	9.6	40	-
Lake Kerinci	Tectonic/ volcanic	710	46	97	1.6
Lake Ranau	Tectonic/ volcanic	540	125.9	229	21.95

== Kalimantan ==
Name	Type	Elevation (m)	Area (km^{2})	Max-depth (m)	Volume (km^{3})
Lake Sentarum	Floodplain	35	275	8	--
Lake Bangkau	Floodplain	10	20	4.5	-
Riam Kanan Reservoir	Reservoir	-	92	-	1.2
Lake Semayang	Floodplain	5	120	6	-
Lake Jempang	Floodplain	50	450	6	-

== Java ==
Name	Type	Elevation (m)	Surface Area (km^{2})	Max-depth (m)	Volume (km^{3})
Saguling Reservoir	Reservoir	645	53.4	99	0.93
Cirata Reservoir	Reservoir	200	62	125	2.16
Jatiluhur Reservoir	Reservoir	111	83	105	2.97
Darma Reservoir	Reservoir	670	4	14	0.04
Sempor Reservoir	Reservoir	100	12?	42	0.052
Mrica Reservoir	Reservoir	200	70?	100	-
Lake Lebak Wangi	Semi-natural	-	0.053	-	-
Lake Rawa Pening	Semi-natural	463	25	14	0.052
Gajah Mungkur Reservoir	Reservoir	140	90	136	0.74
Kedung Ombo Reservoir	Reservoir	100	46	90	0.72
Sengguruh Reservoir	Reservoir	-	-	-	-
Lahor Reservoir	Reservoir	270	2.6	30	0.037
Sutami Reservoir	Reservoir	270	15	50	0.34
Wlingi Reservoir	Reservoir	163	3.8	6	0.024
Selorejo Reservoir	Reservoir	620	4	32	0.062
Wadaslintang Reservoir	Reservoir	-	14.6	-	-

== Lesser Sunda Islands ==
Name	Type	Elevation (m)	Area (km^{2})	Max-depth (m)	Volume (km^{3})
Bali
Lake Tamblingan	Caldera	1,214	1.9	90	-
Lake Buyan	Caldera	1,214	3.9	87	-
Lake Bratan	Caldera	1,231	3.8	22	-
Lake Batur	Caldera	1,031	15.9	88	-
Palasari Reservoir	Reservoir	66	3?	45	-
Lombok
Lake Segara Anak	Crater	2,008	11.3	190	-
Flores
Lake Tigawarna	Crater	1,410	0.4	60	-

== Sulawesi ==
Name	Type	Elevation (m)	Area (km^{2})	Max-depth (m)	Volume (km^{3})
Lake Tondano	Crater	600	50	20	-
Lake Limboto	Floodplain	25	56	2.5	-
Lake Lindu	Tectonic	1,000	32	100	-
Lake Poso	Tectonic	508	323.2	450	-
Lake Sidenreng	Floodplain	6	200?	4	-
Lake Tempe	Floodplain	5	350	5	-
Lake Matano	Tectonic	382	164.1	590	-
Lake Towuti	Tectonic	293	561.1	203	-

== Papua ==
Name	Type	Elevation (m)	Area (km^{2})	Max-depth (m)	Volume (km^{3})
Lake Amaru	Solution	250	22	20	-
Lake Tigi	Solution	1,780	46.9	-	-
Lake Laamora	Solution	400	62.1	50	-
Lake Paniai	Tectonic	1,742	195.5	50	-
Lake Rombebai	Floodplain	10	149	-	-
Lake Sentani	Landslide dam	70	93.6	42	-

== See also ==
- List of lakes
