= Indrata Nur B. =

Indonesian politician (born 1978)

Indrata Nur Bayuaji
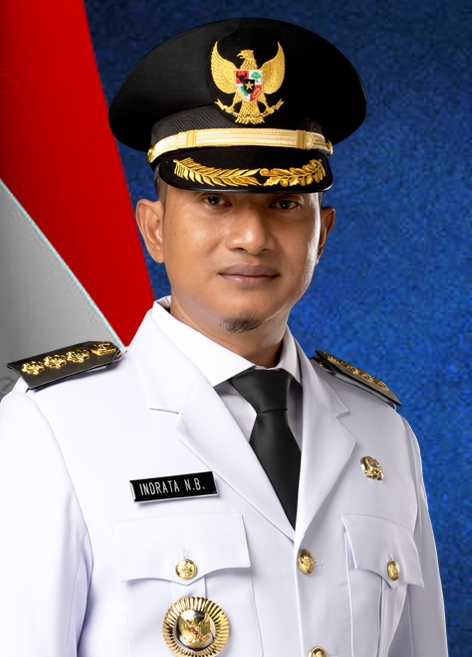
- Official portrait

30th Regent of Pacitan
- Incumbent
- Assumed office 20 February 2025
- President: Prabowo Subianto
- Governor: Khofifah Indar Parawansa
- Deputy: Gagarin Sumrambah
- In office 26 April 2021 – 20 February 2025
- President: Joko Widodo; Prabowo Subianto
- Governor: Khofifah Indar Parawansa
- Deputy: Gagarin Sumrambah
- Preceded by: Indartato; Heru Wiwoho Supadi Putra (D.e.)

Speakers of the Pacitan Regency Regional House of Representatives
- In office 3 October 2019 – 24 September 2020
- President: Joko Widodo
- Regent: Indartato
- Preceded by: Ronny Wahyono
- Succeeded by: Eko Setyoranu (A.O.); Ronny Wahyono

Personal details
- Born: December 16, 1978 (age 47) Pacitan, East Java, Indonesia
- Party: Democratic Party
- Relations: Susilo Bambang Yudhoyono (uncle)
- Education: Malang Foreign Language College
- Occupation: Politician

Indrata Nur Bayuaji (born 16 December 1978) is an Indonesian politician from the Democratic Party who served as Regent of Pacitan for the 2021–2025 and 2025–2030 term. He served for a second term since 20 February 2025 after being inaugurated by President Prabowo Subianto at the Istana Negara, Jakarta. Previously, he served as Speakers of the Pacitan Regency Regional House of Representatives for the 2019–2020 term.

In the 2024 Pacitan regency election, Indrata again ran for Regent of Pacitan for the 2025–2030 term, with the same vice, Gagarin Sumrambah, and was successful, winning 199.410 votes or 68,6% of the total valid votes.

Political offices
Preceded by Indartato; Heru Wiwoho Supadi Putra (D.e.)	Regent of Pacitan; 2021–2025, 2025–present	Succeeded by Incumbent
