= Twin Lake Township =

Twin Lake Township may refer to the following townships in the United States:

- Twin Lake Township, Hancock County, Iowa
- Twin Lake Township, Benson County, North Dakota

== See also ==
- Twin Lakes Township (disambiguation)
