= Twin Lakes (Lake Wales, Florida) =

- Location within Florida Location within the United States
- Location: Lake Wales, Florida
- Coordinates: 27.8936°N 81.5929°W
- Type: natural freshwater lakes
- Basin countries: United States
- Max. length: Twin Lake Lake West 800 feet (240 m), Twin Lake East 1,180 feet (360 m)
- Max. width: Twin Lake West 745 feet (227 m), Twin Lake East 690 feet (210 m)
- Surface area: Twin Lake West 18.76 acres (7.59 ha), Twin Lake East 15.19 acres (6.15 ha)
- Surface elevation: 115 feet (35 m)

The Twin Lakes of Lake Wales, Florida, are two small natural freshwater lakes on the south side of the city. Sometimes they are simply called Twin Lakes, but sometimes they are individually called Twin Lake West and Twin Lake East. All shores of Twin Lake West are swampy, as is the area between the two lakes. The west shore of Twin Lake East is swampy. The west lake, the larger of the two, has a water area of 18.76-acre (75,900 m^{2}). The water area of the east lake is 15.19-acre (61,500 m^{2}).

The eastern shore of Twin Lake East is South 1st Street, which is the western edge of South Gate Shopping Center. As this shore is completely straight, it probably was filled somewhat to allow the construction of the street. On the northeast this lake is bordered by Highway 60, on the northwest by trees, on the west by swampy ground and on the south by single and multiple-family housing.

Twin Lake West is bordered on the north by West Polk Avenue, which is on the south side of Highway 60 and the Midflorida Credit Union. All the lake's shore is swampy, although the north side is the least so. All other sides of this lake are surrounded by wide swamps.

There are no swimming areas or public boat ramps on the shores of either lake, although each has one private boat dock. Twin Lake East can be reached by the public along the right-of-way on the sides of Highway 60 and South 1st Street. There is no public access to Twin Lake West. The Hook and Bullet website says these lakes contain largemouth bass, bluegill and crappie.
