= Twin Lakes Township, Calhoun County, Iowa =

Township in Iowa, US

Twin Lakes Township, Calhoun County
- Township
- Coordinates: 42°26′04″N 094°41′33″W
- Country: United States
- State: Iowa
- County: Calhoun

Area
  - Total: 36.82 sq mi (95.36 km^{2})
  - Land: 36.07 sq mi (93.42 km^{2})
  - Water: 0.75 sq mi (1.94 km^{2})
- Elevation: 1,224 ft (373 m)

Population (2000)
  - Total: 1,434
  - Density: 40/sq mi (15.4/km^{2})
- FIPS code: 19-94152
- GNIS feature ID: 0468802

Twin Lakes Township is one of sixteen townships in Calhoun County, Iowa, United States. As of the 2000 census, its population was 1,434.

== History ==
Twin Lakes Township was created in 1877. It takes its name from two lakes near the northeastern corner.

== Geography ==
Twin Lakes Township covers an area of 36.82 square miles (95.4 km^{2}) and contains one incorporated settlement, Rockwell City. Part of the census-designated place of Twin Lakes occupies the northeast portion of the township, surrounding South Twin Lake. According to the USGS, the township contains one cemetery, Twin Lakes.
