= Ngadirojo =

Administrative district of Wonogiri, Central Java, Indonesia

Ngadirojo is one of the administrative districts (kecamatan) in Wonogiri Regency, Central Java Province of Indonesia. Ngadirojo located in the eastern part of the regency, and is adjacent to Karanganyar District. This district consists of eleven villages, all sharing the postcode of 57681, of which Mlokomanis Kulon and Kasihan have the status of urban kelurahan and the rest are rural desa.

- 33.12.13.2001. Gemawang
- 33.12.13.2002. Kerjo Kidul
- 33.12.13.2003. Gedong
- 33.12.13.2004. Pondok
- 33.12.13.2005. Kerjo Lor
- 33.12.13.2006. Ngadirojo Kidul
- 33.12.13.2007. Ngadirojo Lor
- 33.12.13.2008. Mlokomanis Wetan
- 33.12.13.1009. Mlokomanis Kulon
- 33.12.13.1010. Kasihan
- 33.12.13.2011. Jatimarto
