= Twin Lakes (Portage County, Wisconsin) =

Pair of lakes in the state of Wisconsin, United States

Coordinates: 44°38′15″N 89°24′57″W

- Interactive map of Twin Lakes
- Location: Portage County, Wisconsin

Twin Lakes is a pair of lakes in the U.S. state of Wisconsin.

Twin Lakes was named for the fact there are two lakes side by side.
