= Twin Lakes, Iowa =

- Census-designated place
- Location within the state of Iowa
- Coordinates: 42°29′08″N 94°37′38″W
- Country: United States
- State: Iowa
- County: Calhoun

Area
  - Total: 2.82 sq mi (7.31 km^{2})
  - Land: 1.32 sq mi (3.42 km^{2})
  - Water: 1.50 sq mi (3.89 km^{2})
- Elevation: 1,214 ft (370 m)

Population (2020)
  - Total: 316
  - Density: 239.1/sq mi (92.31/km^{2})
- Time zone: UTC-6 (Central (CST))
  - Summer (DST): UTC-5 (CDT)
- FIPS code: 19-79335
- GNIS feature ID: 2629974

Twin Lakes is an unincorporated community and census-designated place (CDP) in Twin Lakes and Sherman townships in Calhoun County, Iowa, United States. As of the 2020 census it had a population of 316.

== Geography ==
The CDP consists of lakefront communities surrounding two lakes, North Twin Lake and South Twin Lake. The lakes, which do not have a discernible surface outlet, are part of the North Raccoon River watershed, a tributary of the Des Moines River. Twin Lakes State Park occupies the surface area of the two lakes plus small portions of the shoreline.

U.S. Route 20 runs just south of the southern edge of the CDP, leading east 26 miles (42 km) to Fort Dodge and west 90 miles (140 km) to Sioux City. Rockwell City, the Calhoun County seat, is 6 miles (10 km) to the south.

== Demographics ==
Historical population
Census	Pop.	Note	%±
2010	334		—
2020	316		−5.4%
U.S. Decennial Census

=== 2020 census ===
As of the census of 2020, there were 316 people, 149 households, and 118 families residing in the community. The population density was 239.1 inhabitants per square mile (92.3/km^{2}). There were 345 housing units at an average density of 261.0 per square mile (100.8/km^{2}). The racial makeup of the community was 99.1% White, 0.0% Black or African American, 0.0% Native American, 0.0% Asian, 0.0% Pacific Islander, 0.0% from other races and 0.9% from two or more races. Hispanic or Latino persons of any race comprised 0.3% of the population.

Of the 149 households, 10.7% of which had children under the age of 18 living with them, 75.8% were married couples living together, 3.4% were cohabitating couples, 10.7% had a female householder with no spouse or partner present and 10.1% had a male householder with no spouse or partner present. 20.8% of all households were non-families. 18.8% of all households were made up of individuals, 12.1% had someone living alone who was 65 years old or older.

The median age in the community was 63.9 years. 8.5% of the residents were under the age of 20; 2.5% were between the ages of 20 and 24; 13.9% were from 25 and 44; 29.7% were from 45 and 64; and 45.3% were 65 years of age or older. The gender makeup of the community was 49.7% male and 50.3% female.

== Education ==
The CDP is divided between three school districts: Pocahontas Area Community School District, Manson Northwest Webster Community School District, and South Central Calhoun Community School District. A part of the district was in the Rockwell City-Lytton Community School District; that part merged into South Central Calhoun on July 1, 2014.
