= Twin Lakes (El Dorado County, California) =

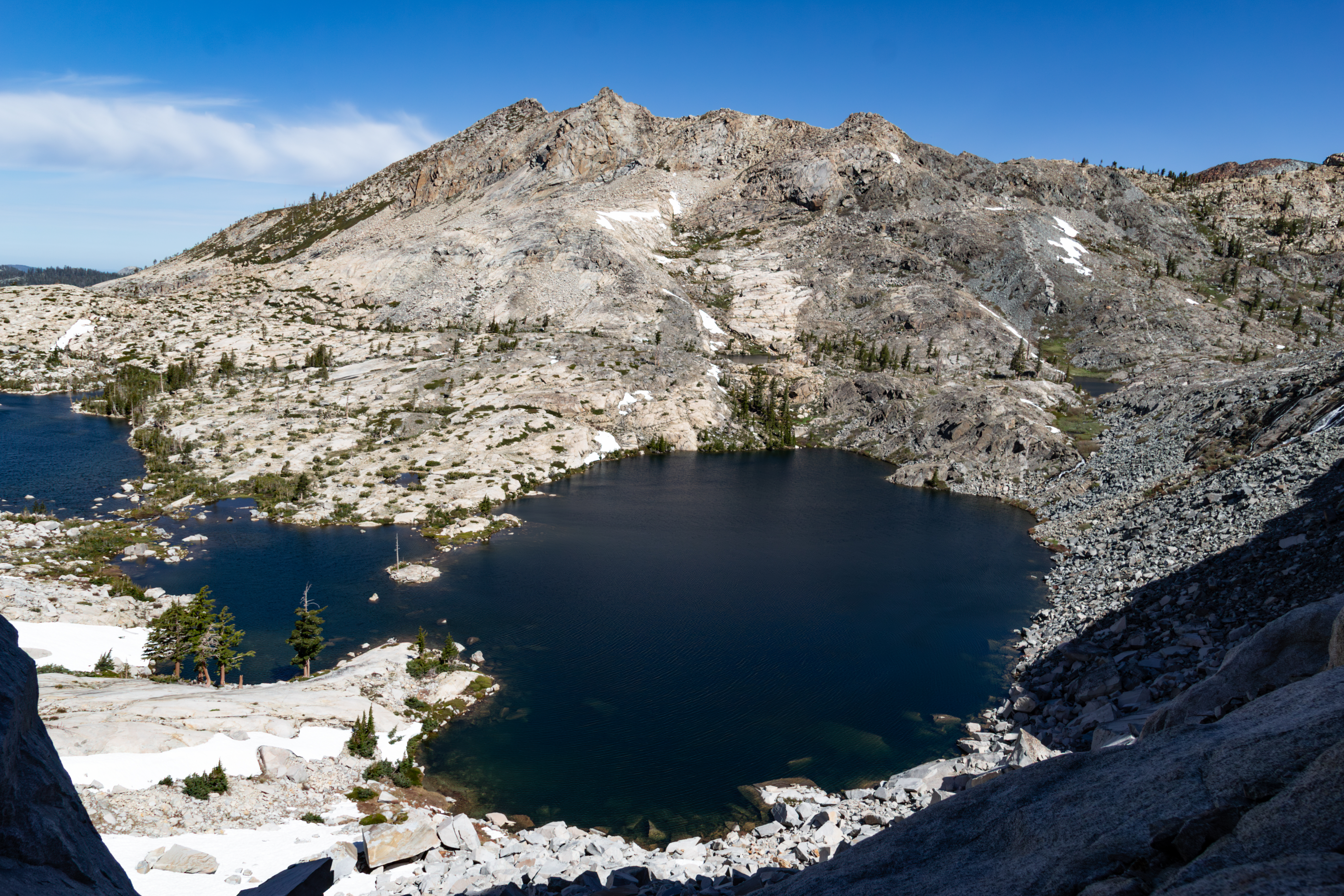
- Image of Upper Twin Lake from the southeast

- Location within California
- Location: Mount Price, El Dorado County, California
- Coordinates: 38.8697°N 120.1918°W
- Type: Alpine lakes
- Basin countries: United States
- Shore length^{1}: Granite landscape
- Surface elevation: 7,988 ft (2,435 m) above sea level
- ^{1} Shore length is not a well-defined measure.

Twin Lakes are a pair of lakes in the Sierra Nevada, on the southwest edge of the Desolation Wilderness in El Dorado County, California.

The lakes are known for their spectacular environment for hiking, in a stark granite landscape. They can be accessed from the Twin Lakes Trailhead, from which the hike is 3 miles long and moderately difficult.

Upper Twin Lake, the higher of the two lakes, is connected to Lower Twin Lake by a very small narrows, which is shallow enough to be crossed on foot. A low partial dam on the narrows' south side makes this crossing easier.

== See also ==
- Desolation Wilderness
