= Twin Lakes, California =

Twin Lakes
- census-designated place
- Location in Santa Cruz County and the state of California

- Location in the United States
- Coordinates: 36°57′48″N 121°59′37″W
- Country: United States
- State: California
- County: Santa Cruz

Area
  - Total: 1.211 sq mi (3.136 km^{2})
  - Land: 0.691 sq mi (1.790 km^{2})
  - Water: 0.520 sq mi (1.346 km^{2}) 42.93%
- Elevation: 52 ft (16 m)

Population (2020)
  - Total: 4,944
  - Density: 7,154/sq mi (2,762/km^{2})
- Time zone: UTC-8 (PST)
  - Summer (DST): UTC-7 (PDT)
- ZIP code: 95066/95067
- Area code: 831
- FIPS code: 06-81050
- GNIS feature ID: 1660053

Twin Lakes is a census-designated place (CDP) in Santa Cruz County, California, United States. The population was 4,944 at the 2020 census, up from 4,917 at the 2010 census.

== Geography ==
Twin Lakes is located at 36°57′48″N 121°59′37″W (36.963450, -121.993498).

According to the United States Census Bureau, the CDP has a total area of 1.2 square miles (3.1 km^{2}), of which 0.7 square miles (1.8 km^{2}) is land and 0.5 square miles (1.3 km^{2}) (42.93%) is water.

Twin Lakes also contains Twin Lakes State Beach, a mile-long beach popular for swimming and picnicking. It has some hiking trails, and is also known for stand-up paddle boarding, and other beach activities.

== Demographics ==
Historical population
Census	Pop.	Note	%±
1960	1,849		—
1970	3,012		62.9%
1980	4,502		49.5%
1990	5,379		19.5%
2000	5,533		2.9%
2010	4,917		−11.1%
2020	4,944		0.5%
U.S. Decennial Census; 1860–1870 1880-1890; 1900 1910 1920; 1930 1940 1950; 1960 1970 1980; 1990 2000 2010; 2020

Twin lakes first appeared as an unincorporated community in the 1960 U.S. census; and as a census-designated place in the 1980 United States census.

=== Racial and ethnic composition ===
Twin Lakes CDP, Santa Cruz County, California – Racial and ethnic composition Note: the US Census treats Hispanic/Latino as an ethnic category. This table excludes Latinos from the racial categories and assigns them to a separate category. Hispanics/Latinos may be of any race.
Race / Ethnicity (NH = Non-Hispanic)	Pop 2000	Pop 2010	Pop 2020	% 2000	% 2010	% 2020
White alone (NH)	3,893	3,421	3,178	70.36%	69.57%	64.28%
Black or African American alone (NH)	47	58	64	0.85%	1.18%	1.29%
Native American or Alaska Native alone (NH)	23	35	13	0.42%	0.71%	0.26%
Asian alone (NH)	127	119	139	2.30%	2.42%	2.81%
Native Hawaiian or Pacific Islander alone (NH)	8	7	6	0.14%	0.14%	0.12%
Other race alone (NH)	21	13	22	0.38%	0.26%	0.44%
Mixed race or Multiracial (NH)	167	155	310	3.02%	3.15%	6.27%
Hispanic or Latino (any race)	1,247	1,109	1,212	22.54%	22.55%	24.51%
Total	5,533	4,917	4,944	100.00%	100.00%	100.00%

=== 2020 ===
The 2020 United States census reported that the Twin Lakes CDP had a population of 4,944. The population density was 7,154.8 inhabitants per square mile (2,762.5/km^{2}). The racial makeup of the CDP was 69.5% White, 1.3% African American, 1.2% Native American, 3.0% Asian, 0.1% Pacific Islander, 12.4% from other races, and 12.4% from two or more races. Hispanic or Latino of any race were 24.5% of the population.

The census reported that 96.1% of the population lived in households, 2.6% lived in non-institutionalized group quarters, and 1.3% were institutionalized.

There were 2,227 households, out of which 19.6% included children under the age of 18, 32.0% were married-couple households, 10.9% were cohabiting couple households, 35.1% had a female householder with no partner present, and 22.0% had a male householder with no partner present. 38.2% of households were one person, and 18.2% were one person aged 65 or older. The average household size was 2.13. There were 1,064 families (47.8% of all households).

The age distribution was 14.5% under the age of 18, 8.2% aged 18 to 24, 29.8% aged 25 to 44, 25.5% aged 45 to 64, and 22.0% who were 65 years of age or older. The median age was 43.0 years. For every 100 females, there were 92.8 males.

There were 2,765 housing units at an average density of 4,001.4 units per square mile (1,544.9 units/km^{2}), of which 2,227 (80.5%) were occupied. Of these, 41.9% were owner-occupied, and 58.1% were occupied by renters.

In 2023, the US Census Bureau estimated that the median household income was $81,288, and the per capita income was $61,328. About 10.8% of families and 15.9% of the population were below the poverty line.

=== 2010 ===
At the 2010 census Twin Lakes had a population of 4,917. The population density was 4,060.7 inhabitants per square mile (1,567.8/km^{2}). The racial makeup of Twin Lakes was 3,900 (79.3%) White, 70 (1.4%) African American, 61 (1.2%) Native American, 126 (2.6%) Asian, 8 (0.2%) Pacific Islander, 534 (10.9%) from other races, and 218 (4.4%) from two or more races. Hispanic or Latino of any race were 1,109 persons (22.6%).

The census reported that 4,782 people (97.3% of the population) lived in households, 35 (0.7%) lived in non-institutionalized group quarters, and 100 (2.0%) were institutionalized.

There were 2,223 households, 463 (20.8%) had children under the age of 18 living in them, 669 (30.1%) were opposite-sex married couples living together, 232 (10.4%) had a female householder with no husband present, 102 (4.6%) had a male householder with no wife present. There were 227 (10.2%) unmarried opposite-sex partnerships, and 21 (0.9%) same-sex married couples or partnerships. 813 households (36.6%) were one person and 274 (12.3%) had someone living alone who was 65 or older. The average household size was 2.15. There were 1,003 families (45.1% of households); the average family size was 2.84.

The age distribution was 770 people (15.7%) under the age of 18, 651 people (13.2%) aged 18 to 24, 1,572 people (32.0%) aged 25 to 44, 1,220 people (24.8%) aged 45 to 64, and 704 people (14.3%) who were 65 or older. The median age was 36.8 years. For every 100 females, there were 94.8 males. For every 100 females age 18 and over, there were 91.4 males.

There were 2,741 housing units at an average density of 2,263.7 per square mile, of the occupied units 820 (36.9%) were owner-occupied and 1,403 (63.1%) were rented. The homeowner vacancy rate was 3.5%; the rental vacancy rate was 3.9%. 1,673 people (34.0% of the population) lived in owner-occupied housing units and 3,109 people (63.2%) lived in rental housing units.

== Government ==
In the California State Legislature, Twin Lakes is in the 17th senatorial district, represented by Democrat John Laird, and in the 30th Assembly district, represented by Democrat Dawn Addis.

In the United States House of Representatives, Twin Lakes is in California's 19th congressional district, represented by Democrat Jimmy Panetta.
