= Lake Diatas =

Lake in Indonesia

Diatas
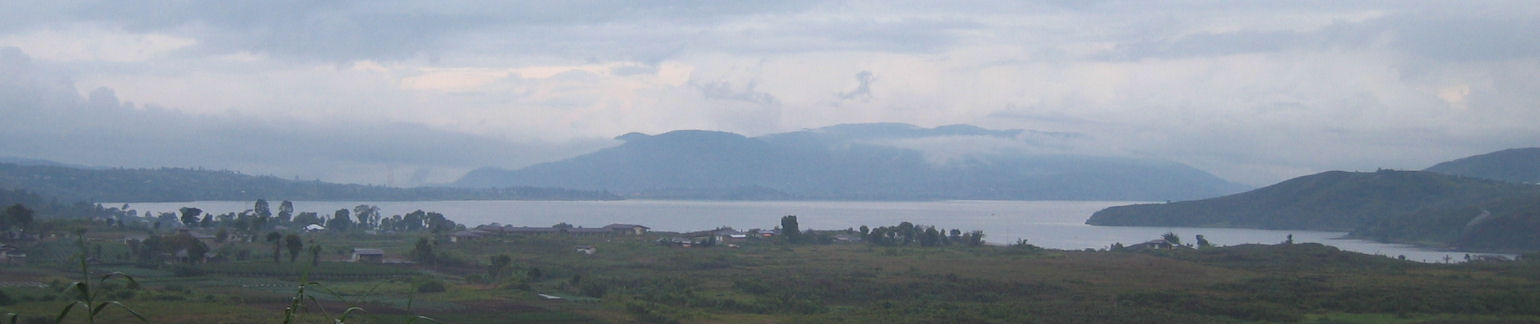

- Location within Sumatra
- Location: West Sumatra, Indonesia
- Coordinates: 1°4′37″S 100°45′17″E
- Type: Tectonic
- Part of: Batanghari basin
- Primary outflows: Gunanti River
- Basin countries: Indonesia
- Surface area: 12.3 km^{2} (4.7 sq mi)
- Max. depth: 44 m (144 ft)
- Surface elevation: 1,531 m (5,023 ft)

Lake Diatas (Indonesian: Danau Diatas, 'Upper Lake'; Minangnese: Danau Diateh) is a lake in West Sumatra, Indonesia. It is located at 1°4′37″S 100°45′17″E. This lake together with Lake Dibawah, are known as the Twin Lakes (Danau Kembar).

== See also ==
- List of lakes of Indonesia
