= Lake Dibawah =

Lake in West Sumatera, Indonesia

Dibawah
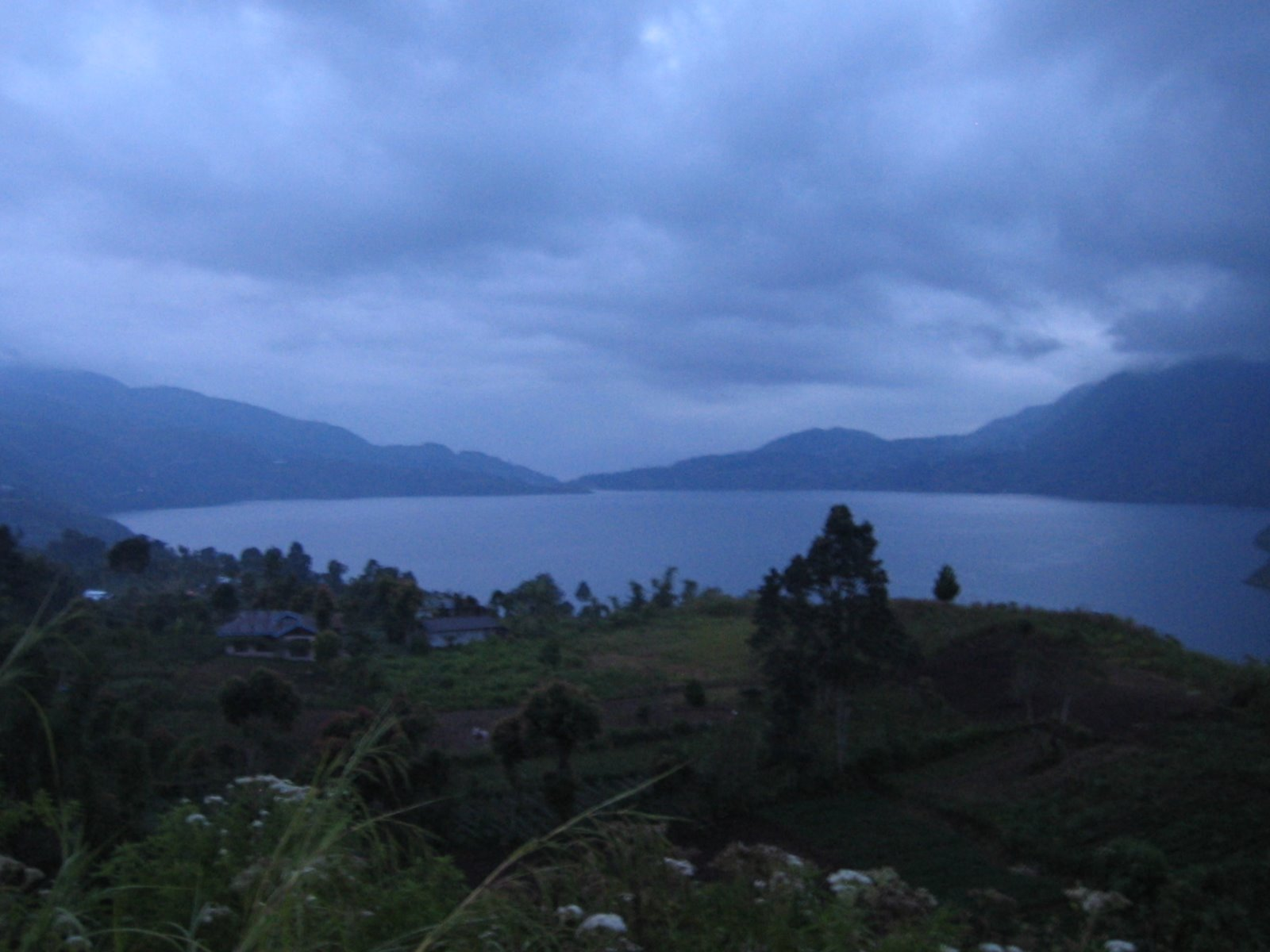

- Location within Sumatra
- Location: West Sumatra, Indonesia
- Coordinates: 1°0′35″S 100°43′51″E
- Type: Tectonic
- Part of: Indragiri basin
- Primary outflows: Lembong River
- Basin countries: Indonesia
- Surface area: 11.2 km^{2} (4.3 sq mi)
- Max. depth: 309 m (1,014 ft)
- Surface elevation: 1,462 m (4,797 ft)

Lake Dibawah (Indonesian: Danau Dibawah, 'Lower Lake'; Minangnese: Danau Dibawah) is a lake in West Sumatra, Indonesia. It is located at 1°0′35″S 100°43′51″E. This lake together with Lake Diatas, are known as the Twin Lakes (Danau Kembar).

== See also ==
- List of lakes of Indonesia
