= Wonogiri Regency =

Regency in Central Java, Indonesia

Wonogiri Regency Kabupaten Wonogiri
- Regency
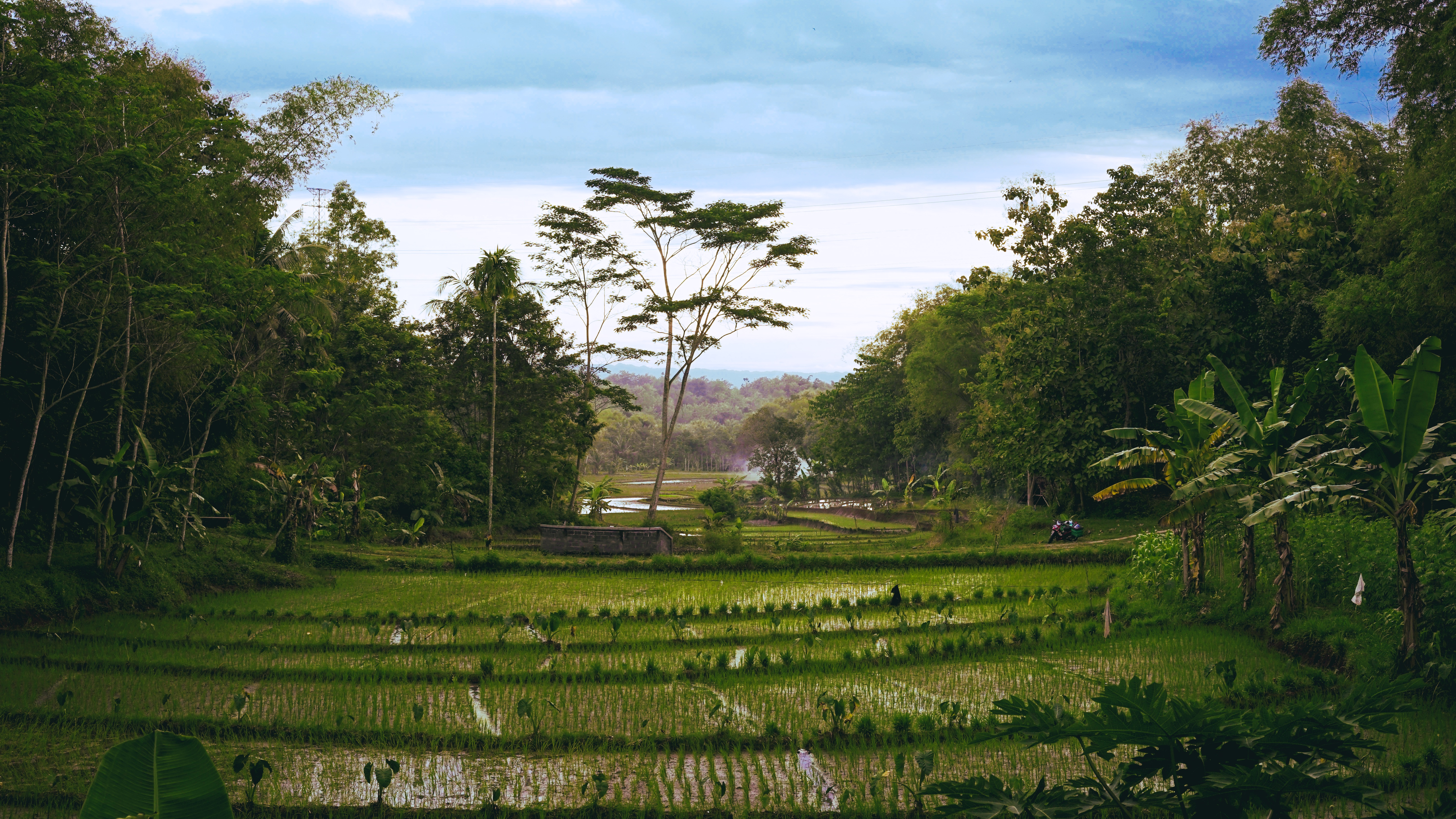
- Paddy fields in Wonogiri

- Seal
- Motto: Sabda Sakti Nugrahaning Praja (Sacred utterance of the town's welfare)
- Anthem: Wonogiri Sukses (jv)
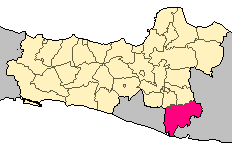
- Location of Wonogiri Regency in Central Java
- Coordinates: 7°55′S 111°03′E
- Country: Indonesia
- Province: Central Java
- Founded: 19 May 1741
- Capital: Wonogiri

Government
  - Regent: Setyo Sukarno
  - Vice-Regent: Imron Rizkyarno

Area
  - Total: 1,905.75 km^{2} (735.81 sq mi)
  - Water: 567.2 km^{2} (219.0 sq mi)
- Elevation: 140 m (460 ft)

Population (mid 2025 estimate)
  - Total: 1,057,045
  - Density: 554.661/km^{2} (1,436.57/sq mi)
- Demonym(s): Wonogiren, Wonogirian, Bocah Wonogiri

Demographics
  - Ethnic groups: Javanese, Chinese, European
  - Religion: Islam, Christianity, Hinduism, Buddhism and traditional Javanese beliefs (in Purwantoro)
  - Languages: Indonesian, Javanese
- Time zone: UTC+7 (WIB)
- ZIP code: 576xx
- Area code: +62 273
- Vehicle registration: AD
- Website: wonogirikab.go.id

Wonogiri Regency is a regency (kabupaten) in the southeastern part of Central Java province in Indonesia. It is bordered to the north by Sukoharjo Regency and Karanganyar Regency, to the east by East Java Province (mainly Pacitan Regency), to the south by the Indian Ocean, and to the west by the Special Region of Yogyakarta. It covers an area of 1,905.75 km^{2}, and its population was 928,904 at the 2010 Census and 1,043,177 at the 2020 Census; the official estimate as at mid 2025 was 1,057,045 (comprising 527,157 males and 529,888 females). The capital and largest town is Wonogiri, around 33 km southeast of the large Central Java metropolis of Surakarta. The regency includes the large Gajah Mungkur Reservoir in the upper reaches of the Solo River, with a surface area of 88 km^{2}.

== Administrative districts ==
Wonogiri Regency is divided into twenty-five administrative districts (Indonesian: kecamatan), tabulated below with their areas and their populations at the 2010 Census and the 2020 Census, together with the official estimates as at mid 2025. The table also includes the locations of the district administrative centres, the number of administrative villages in each district (totaling 251 rural desa and 43 urban kelurahan), and its post code.

Kode Wilayah	Name of District (kecamatan)	Area in km^{2}	Pop'n Census 2010	Pop'n Census 2020	Pop'n Estimate mid 2025	Admin centre	No. of kelu- rahan	No. of desa	Post code
33.12.01	Pracimantoro	144.51	58,892	65,414	65,545	Pracimantoro	1	17	57664
33.12.24	Paranggupito ^{(a)}	64.44	16,533	17,760	17,789	Paranggupito	-	8	57679
33.12.02	Giritontro	56.28	19,285	20,465	20,499	Giritontro	2	5	57678
33.12.03	Giriwoyo	107.01	35,883	38,953	39,018	Girowoyo	2	14	57675
33.12.04	Batuwarno	55.72	16,907	17,889	17,919	Batuwarno	1	7	57674
33.12.23	Karangtengah	89.79	22,031	23,579	23,618	Karangtengah	-	5	57677
33.12.05	Tirtomoyo	99.54	48,652	54,001	54,091	Tirtomoyo	2	12	57672
33.12.06	Nguntoronadi	65.93	22,648	24,715	24,546	Kedungrejo	2	9	57671
33.12.07	Baturetno	69.93	44,320	47,711	47,790	Baturetno	-	13	57673
33.12.08	Eromoko	123.74	40,544	43,957	44,030	Eromoko	2	13	57663
33.12.09	Wuryantoro	62.71	25,476	26,491	26,535	Wuryantoro	2	6	57661
33.12.10	Manyaran	81.40	33,868	35,930	35,990	Karanglor	2	5	57662
33.12.11	Selogiri	51.16	37,830	46,474	48,894	Kaliancar	1	10	57652
33.12.12	Wonogiri (district)	84.59	77,271	86,437	86,907	Giripurwo	6	9	57611: 57615
33.12.13	Ngadirojo	93.95	52,831	59,643	60,235	Ngadirojo Kidul	2	9	57681
33.12.14	Sidoharjo	59.51	39,332	42,831	43,064	Sidoharjo	2	10	57682
33.12.15	Jatiroto	71.06	35,623	41,230	42,144	Jatiroto	2	13	57692
33.12.16	Kismantoro ^{(b)}	75.66	35,505	40,200	40,616	Kismantoro	2	8	57696
33.12.17	Purwantoro ^{(b)}	62.55	48,048	55,885	57,259	Bangsri	2	13	57695
33.12.18	Bulukerto ^{(b)}	44.38	28,854	33,793	34,740	Bulurejo	1	9	57697
33.12.25	Puhpelem ^{(b)}	32.34	18,947	21,144	21,235	Puhpelem	1	5	57698
33.12.19	Slogohimo	69.64	45,107	52,378	53,623	Slogohimo	2	15	57694
33.12.20	Jatisrono	56.03	56,133	63,196	63,738	Jatisrono	2	15	57691
33.12.21	Jatipurno	60.98	30,699	37,532	39,394	Jatipurno	2	9	57693
33.12.22	Girimarto	62.06	37,685	45,569	47,576	Tambakmerang	2	12	57683
	Totals	1,905.75	928,904	1,043,177	1,057,045	Wonogiri	43	251	

Notes: (a) Paranggupito District includes the whole of the Regency's sea coast (off the southern coast of Java). (b) these four districts form a salient stretching eastwards into East Java Province.

The 43 kelurahan comprise 1 in Pracimantoro District (Gedong), 2 in Giritontro District (Bayemharjo and Giritontro), 2 in Giriwoyo District (Girikikis and Giriwoyo), 1 in Batuwarno District (Selopuro), 2 in Tirtomoyo District (Ngarjosari and Tirtomoyo), 2 in Nguntoronadi District (Beji and Kedungrejo), 2 in Eromoko District (Ngadirejo and Puloharjo), 2 in Wuryantoro District (Mojopuro and Wuryantoro), 2 in Manyaran District (Pagutan and Punduhsari), 1 in Selogiri District (Kaliancar), 6 in Wonogiri District (Giripurwo, Giritirto, Giriwono, Wonoboyo, Wonokarto and Wuryorejo), 2 in Ngadirojo District (Kasihan and Mlokomanis Kulon), 2 in Sidoharjo District (Kayuloko and Sidoharjo), 2 in Jatiroto District (Jatiroto and Sanggrong), 2 in Kismantoro District (Gesing and Kismantoro), 2 in Purwantoro District (Purwantoro and Tegalrejo), 1 in Bulukerto District (Bulukerto), 1 in Puhpelem District (Giriharjo), 2 in Slogohimo District (Bulusari and Karang), 2 in Jatisrono District (Pelem and Tanjungsari), 2 in Jatipurno District (Balepanjang and Jatipurno), and 2 in Girimarto District (Gemawang and Sidokarto).

== Agriculture ==
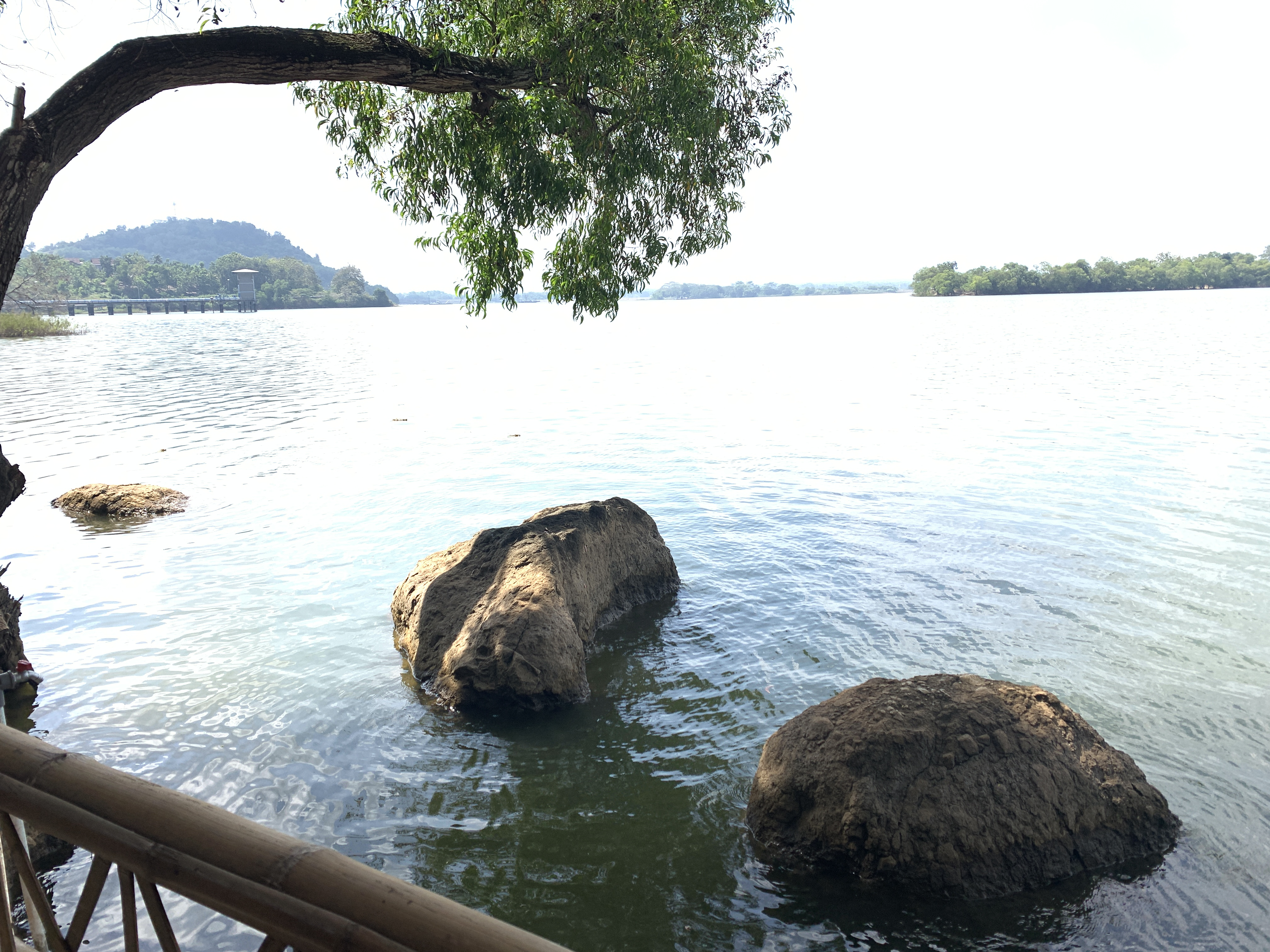
Gading Purba beach

Wonogiri Regency is an area of agriculture and plantation, so most of people in the regency work as farmers. Generally, all areas of the regency produce much agriculture and plantation output. Casava, cacao, and cashew are examples of the plantation output that are relatively good. Wonogiri also has many special foods. They include nasi tiwul, emping, bakso, mie ayam, gudangan, etc.

== Topography ==
Most of Wonogiri Regency's area is rocky and hilly due to its location on the Sewu highlands. Since these highlands are of the karst type, many caves can easily be found in Wonogiri Regency and at least 41 caves have been discovered so far starting with the famous Song Gilap cave, Song Putri cave at Pracimantoro, Ngantap cave, Putri Kencana cave at Giritontro and including many unnamed caves all over the regency.

Wonogiri Regency also has a dam called Gajah Mungkur Dam which has three main functions; as a power plant to produce Hydroelectricity; to provide water for rice fields around Bengawan Solo River through irrigation programs; and for tourism. The dam has created a reservoir covering 88 km^{2} which lies 6 km south of Wonogiri town.

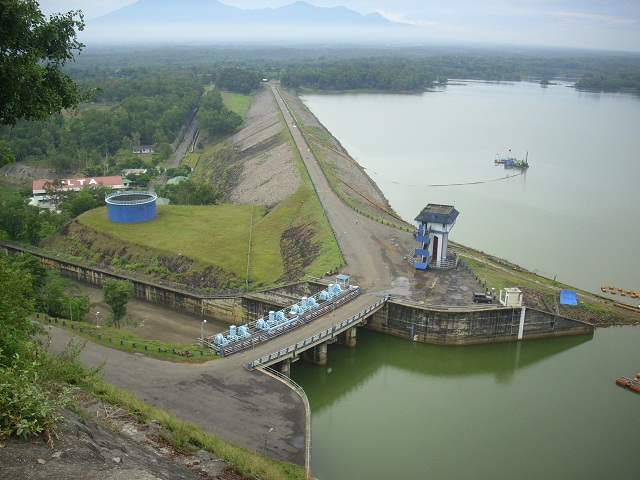
Gajah Mungkur Reservoir Dam

== Notable landmarks ==
Notable landmarks include:

1. Gajah Mungkur Dam (Waduk Gajah Mungkur)
2. Sembukan beach in Paranggupito District
3. Nampu beach in Paranggupito District
4. Kahyangan waterfall in Tirtomoyo District
5. Kethu forest in Wonogiri District
6. Putri Kencana cave in Pracimantoro District
7. Girimanik waterfall in Slogohimo District
8. Nggaguk Tirta Lestari swimming pool, cafe, restaurant in Jatisrono District
9. Seper forest at Jatipurno
10. Paragliding (Indonesian: Gantole) sports site nearby Gajah Mungkur dam
11. Off-Roading nearby Gajah Mungkur dam
12. Plinteng Semar Miracle Stone in Wonogiri District
13. Gunung Kembar Gandul a small mountain in Wonogiri District
14. Gunung Pegat Small Mountain at Ngadiroyo, Nguntoronadi District
15. Gunung Kencur Small Mountain at Ngadiroyo, Nguntoronadi District

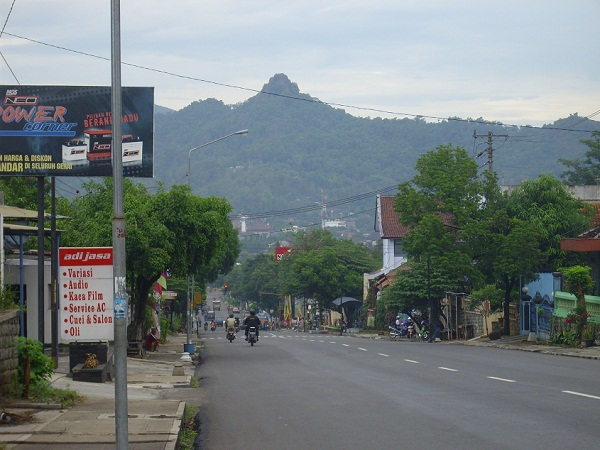
Downtown of Wonogiri (Gandul Hill as Background)

== Transportation ==
- Wonogiri railway station
- Giri Adipura bus terminal
