= Probo Yulastoro =

Indonesian politician (1966–2023)

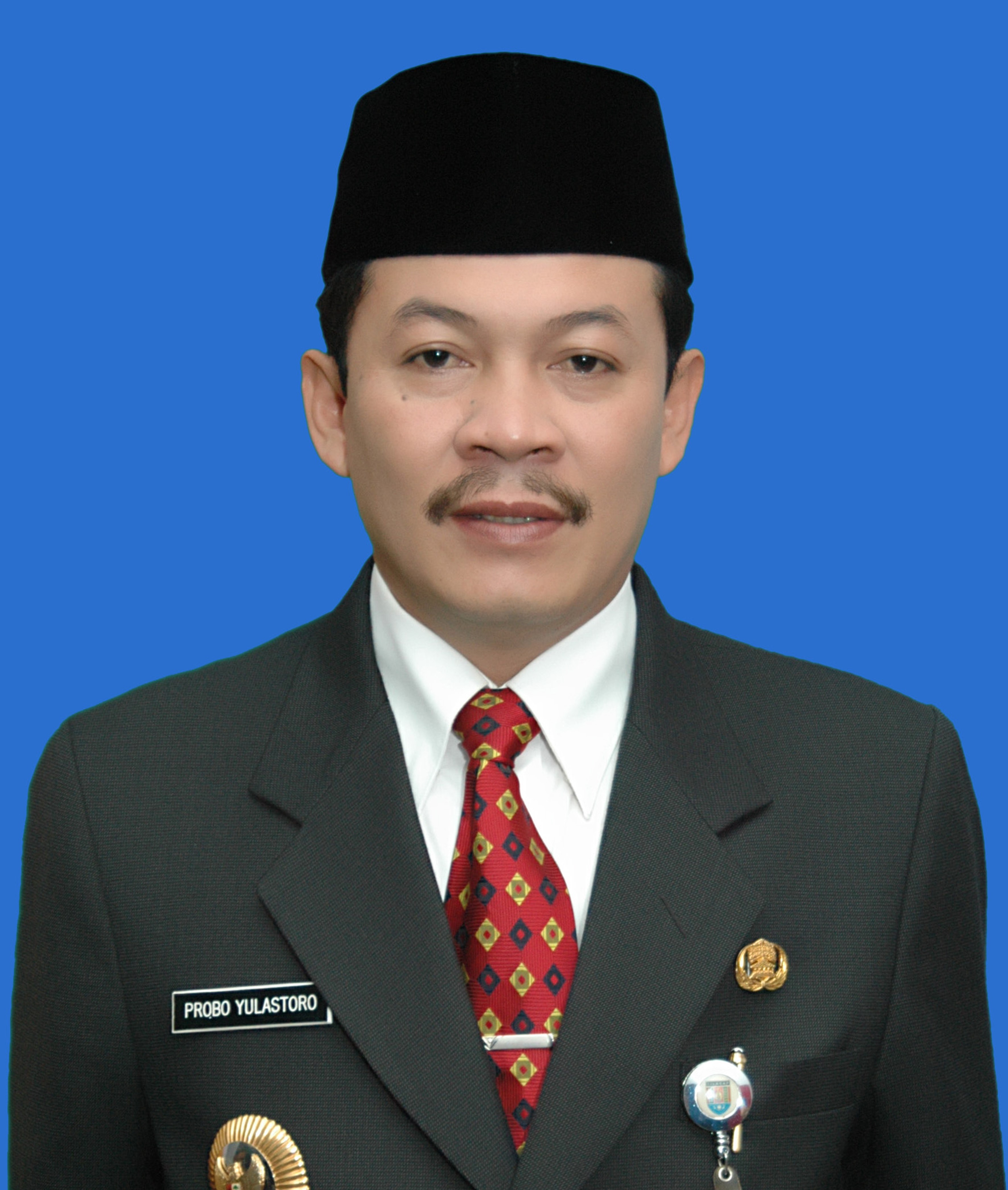

Regent of Cilacap
- In office 2002–2010
- Preceded by: Herry Tabri Karta
- Succeeded by: Tatto Suwarto Pamuji

Personal details
- Born: 20 May 1966 Cilacap, Central Java, Indonesia
- Died: 20 August 2023 (aged 57) Cilacap, Central Java, Indonesia
- Spouse: Uyeni Yulastoro
- Children: 4
- Education: Purwokerto Wijayakusuma University (S.Sos.); Jenderal Soedirman University

Probo Yulastoro (20 May 1966 – 20 August 2023) was an Indonesian businessman and politician who served as the Regent of Cilacap from 2000 until his arrest in 2010. Probo was involved in the private sector before being elected as a regent.

== Early life and education ==
Probo was born on 20 May 1966 in Cilacap, Central Java. He completed his education at the Karangjati State Elementary School in Maos, Cilacap, in 1979, Sampang State Junior High School in 1982, and Kroya State High School in Cilacap in 1985. He received a bachelor's degree in administration sciences from the Wijayakusuma University in Purwakarta in 1997 and a master's degree in management from the Jenderal Soedirman University in Purwokerto in 2002.

== Organization and business career ==
During his time at university, Probo was involved in Karang Taruna, a state-mandated youth organization, and became the chair of Karang Taruna in his hometown of Karangjati, Cilacap. He established the Serbuk Super jamu company, which produces a traditional jamu drink and was entrusted to lead the Aneka Jamu Cooperatives, a union of 526 jamu producers, in 2001. He had previously been elected as the chairman of the Cahaya Sejati jamu union in 1997 and the coordinating officer for jamu producers in the former Banyumas Residency in 1999.

In 1999, Probo was summoned by Indonesia's Food and Drug Authority for mixing chemical drugs with his jamu. The agency threatened him with legal action, and pharmacists from the health department and Gadjah Mada University were sent to supervise the jamu production.

== Regent of Cilacap ==
Probo joined the Indonesian Democratic Party of Struggle (PDIP) shortly after its establishment and became the head of the trade, industry, and cooperatives department in the party's Cilacap branch.

=== First term ===
Probo was nominated as the Regent of Cilacap in late 2002 by the PDIP. His running mate, Tohirin Bahri, was a politician from the Muslim-based United Development Party. His candidacy was also supported by jamu producers, social organizations, local banks, and contractors. In the indirect election held by the Cilacap regional council, Probo received 25 of the 45 votes cast, and he was installed as the regent of Cilacap in November 2002.

In 2003, a civil society group linked to Probo staged protests against the Regional Secretary of Cilacap, Saroso. Saroso resigned from his position next year, which allowed Probo to strengthen his grip over Cilacap's bureaucracy. On the same year, Probo, along with the speaker of the local council Frans Lukman, participated in an anti-American protest in Cilacap, which urged the government to sever diplomatic ties with the United States and boycott United States products.

In July 2003, Probo introduced a free education and medical program for public school students. Around the same period, civil servants and teachers reported to the Jakarta Post that they were forced to buy T-shirts bearing the face of Probo and Frans Lukman. Civil servants were reportedly invited to PDIP's party meetings, which discussed strategies for the party to win the upcoming 2004 Indonesian legislative election. Aside from these controversies, Probo also committed various forms of embezzlement which bypassed the local legislature.

=== Second term ===
Probo decided to run for a second term with support from PDIP, the National Awakening Party, the Prosperous Justice Party, and the Pioneers' Party. Probo's running mate in the election, Tatto Suwarto Pamuji, was a religious leader who was close to local kyai. Probo's sole opponent in the election, Siti Fatimah, initially tried to secure PDIP's endorsement, but was rejected. She was instead endorsed by Golkar. Probo won the election with 51.1% votes, defeating Siti Fatimah by around 20,000 votes. Siti Fatimah tried to sue the local electoral commission for rigging the election in favor of Probo. In response to the legal attempt by Siti, Probo supporters held rallies defending the validity of the election. The court ruled in favor of Probo and the case was dismissed.

In December 2007, the NGO Parliament Watch Cilacap (PWC) compiled a list of corruption cases by Probo during his first term and reported it to various institutions at the national level in Jakarta, including the Corruption Eradication Commission, the attorney general's office, and the national police. Probo initially attempted to obstruct the investigation by establishing a political alliance which included politicians and civil servants. Opposition groups, including Siti Fatimah, who had benefited from Probo's rule, threw their support behind Probo and denied the corruption allegations.

Probo's attempt to halt the investigation began to shatter after the then-President Susilo Bambang Yudhoyono launched a campaign on an anti-corruption platform in preparation for the 2009 Indonesian presidential election. The lack of presence of the Democratic Party—Susilo Bambang Yudhoyono's party—in Cilacap's local council meant that the party was largely unlikely to be implicated in the corruption case. The case was further pushed with former activists who joined the Democratic Party and became legislative candidates from the party. These activists had previously protested against corruption during Probo's first term.

The investigation of Probo's case began in March 2009, just a month prior to the general election. PDIP decided to withdraw its support from Probo and members of the Probo administration became witnesses in exchange for legal protection. The investigation was described as a "corruption prosecution in a record time". Probo's corruption case expanded into three separate cases and the amount of money embezzled by Probo, which totaled to Rp. 21.8 billion ($2.2 million), was announced by the Finance and Development Oversight Board. Probo, along with his financial chief and regional secretary, was arrested in mid-2009. Upon his arrest, he was removed from his position as regent, and his office was taken over by Tatto Suwarto Pamuji. He was sentenced to nine years in prison in February 2010. His prison term was reduced to four years by the Supreme Court in September that year.

== Personal life and death ==
Probo was married to Sri Uyeni and had four children. His brother, Sri Bintoro Aji, was elected as a councilor in the local Cilacap council.

Probo Yulastoro died at the Cilacap Regional Hospital on 20 August 2023, at the age of 57. Three days earlier, Probo was rushed to the hospital due to an undisclosed complication. He was buried on the same day in his home village.

== Bibliography ==
- Clark, S. (2013), Enforcing corruption laws: the political economy of subnational prosecutions in Indonesia, University of Oxford
