= Pancuran Tujuh =

Coordinates: 7°18′35.89″S 109°13′4.8″E

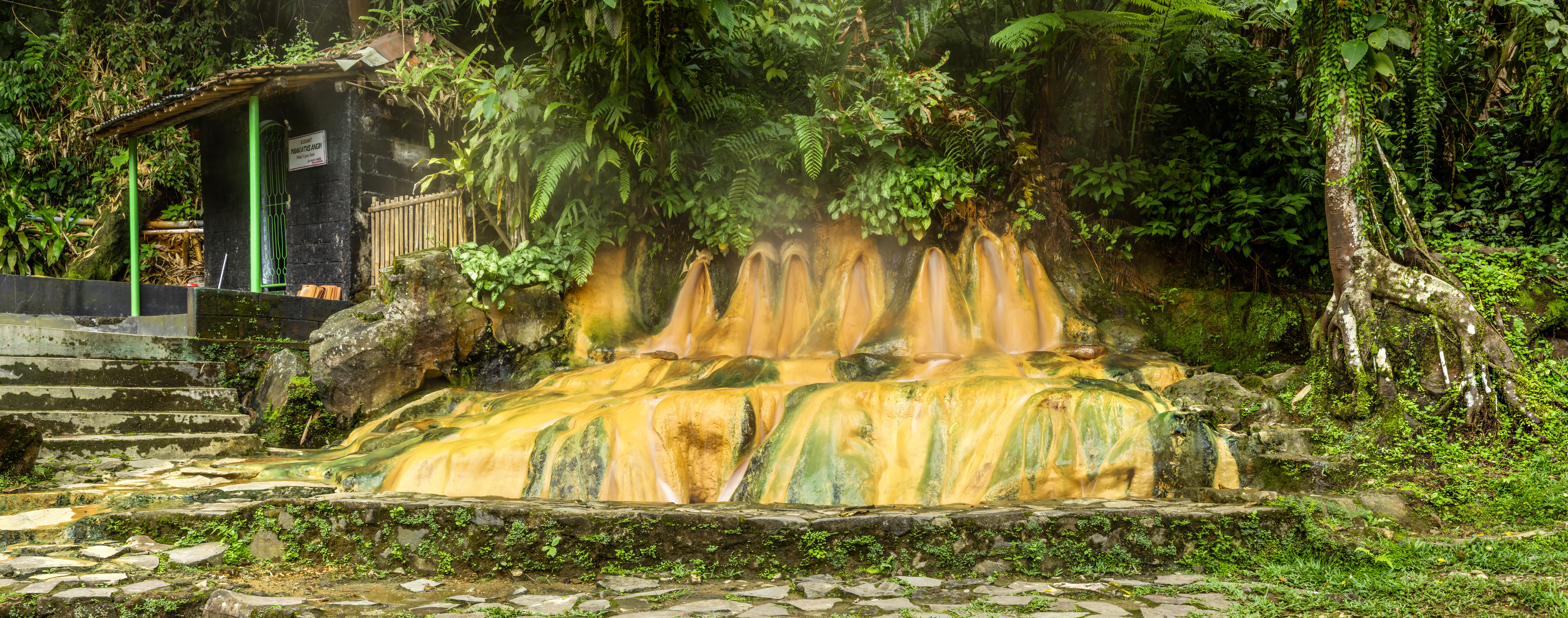
Pancuran Tujuh (center). The entrance to the petilasan to Mbah Atas Angin is beside it.

Pancuran Tujuh (Javanese: Pancuran Pitu, both meaning "Seven Springs") is a hot spring located on the slopes of Mount Slamet in Baturraden District, Banyumas, Central Java. Discovered, according to local legend, by a Muslim missionary known as Mbah Atas Angin, the hot spring and its sulfuric waters are considered to have healing properties.

== Location ==
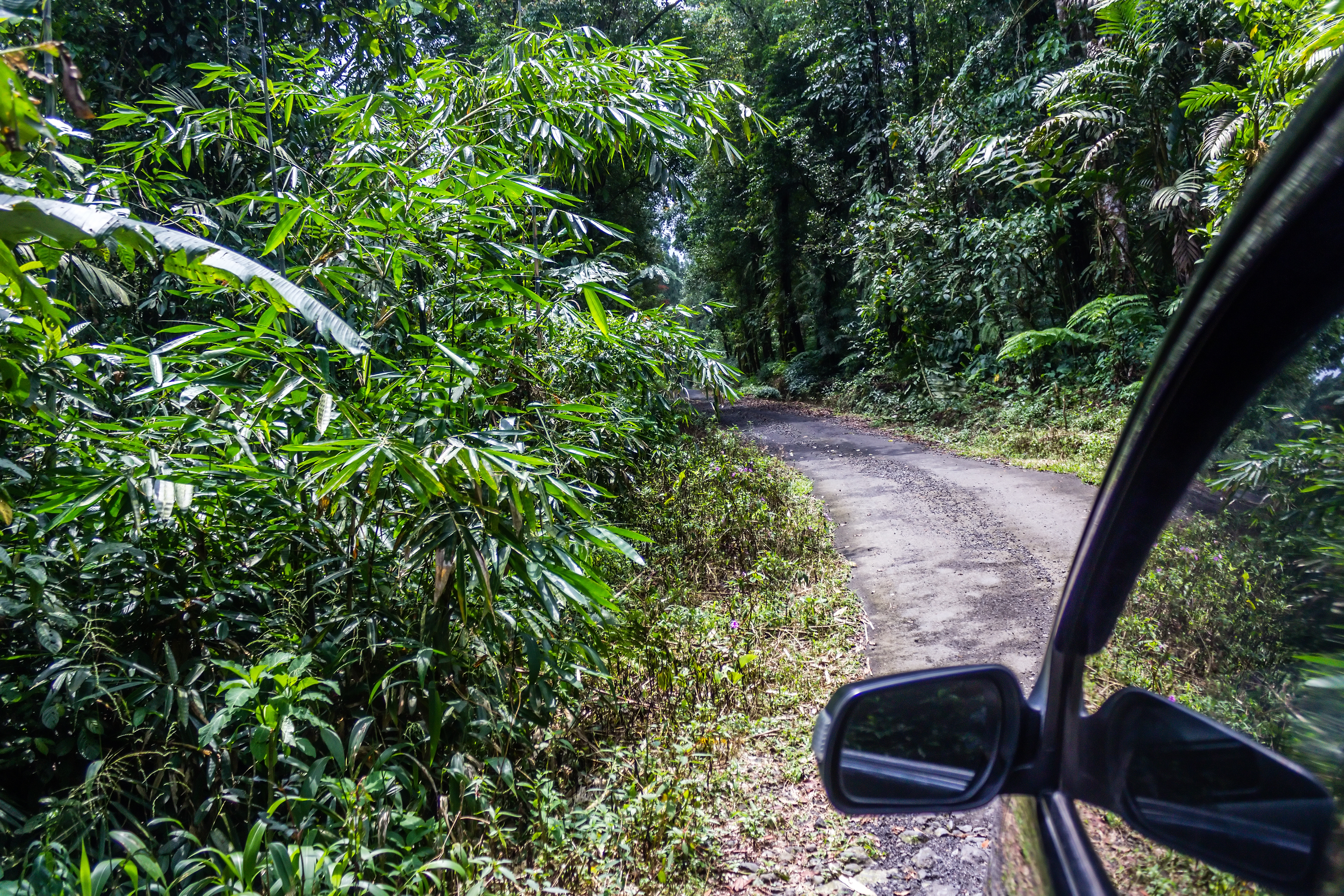
Road to Pancuran Tujuh, 2015

Pancuran Tujuh is located in Kemutung Lor Village, Baturraden District, Banyumas, Central Java, amidst a pine forest on the slopes of Mount Slamet. It is situated some 2.5 kilometres (1.6 mi) to the west of the Baturraden Tourist Resort, and about 15 kilometres (9.3 mi) north of the city of Purwokerto.

The hot spring is accessible by paved road, though, as of 2015, it is in poor condition, and as such it is more common for visitors to take motorcycles than cars. Pancuran Tujuh can also be accessed by a 5-kilometre (3.1 mi) walk through the Baturraden resort. From the parking area, visitors must descend about 200 steps (a distance of 300 metres (980 ft)) to reach the springs.

== History ==
According to local legend, a man named Syekh Maulana Maghribi (known locally as Mbah Atas Angin [Grandfather from the Winds] as he had come a great distance) discovered the springs. Sailing to Gresik on Java to spread Islam, he and a follower spotted a strange light. They followed it to Pemalang, then made their way overland. However, Maghribi fell ill with a strange skin condition, and received a vision that he had to climb the southern mountains to treat it. There he found seven springs, which he named Pancuran Pitu, and bathed in the waters, treating himself.

The Pancuran Tujuh area is, as of 2003, managed by the state-owned Perhutani company.

== Description ==
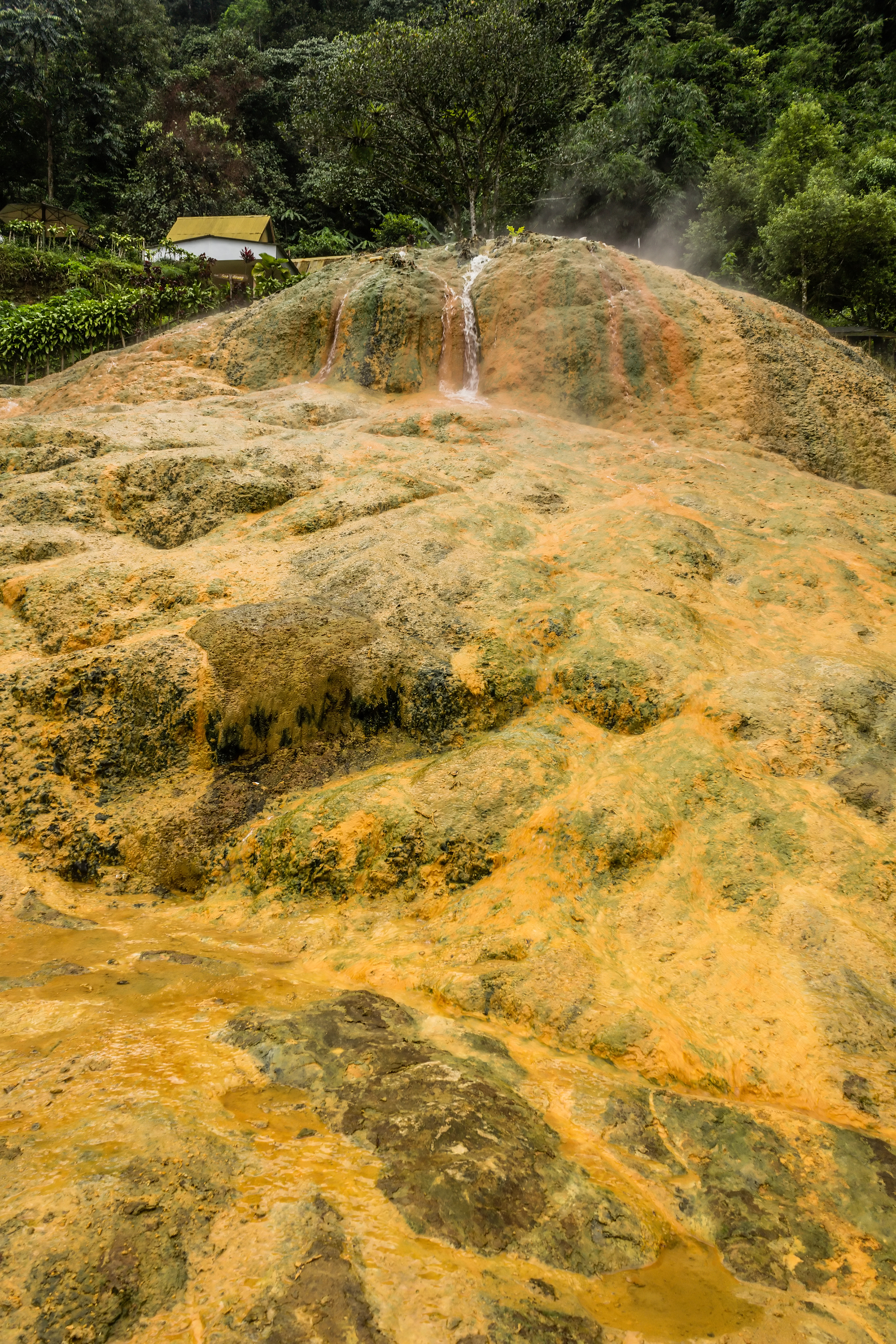
Mineral deposits from Pancuran Tujuh

Pancuran Tujuh, as suggested by the name, consists of seven natural springs which release water at a temperature of 70–90 °C (158–194 °F). The waters drop about 1 metre (3 ft 3 in) from the outlets. A 2003 study found the spring to have a consistent flow, averaging 1,324.5 cubic metres (46,770 cu ft) a day.

The waters contain sulfur and other minerals, with the sulfur content measuring 230.8 parts per million. As such, the waters are considered to have healing properties by local residents, and the springs are used to treat skin conditions and rheumatism. The sulfuric waters of Pancuran Tujuh pour down the slope, and over the centuries have left a mineral deposit.

Waters from Pancuran Tujuh also pool in nearby caves. These include Sarabadak, where Mbah Atas Angin and his followers are held to have lived, as well as Kembar, Selirang, and Sri Warna. Sarabadak serves as a petilasan (monument) to Mbah Atas Angin, with its entrance located next to the springs. The path to Pancuran Tujuh overlooks nearby Purwokerto, with the cities of Purbalingga and Cilacap visible on clear days.

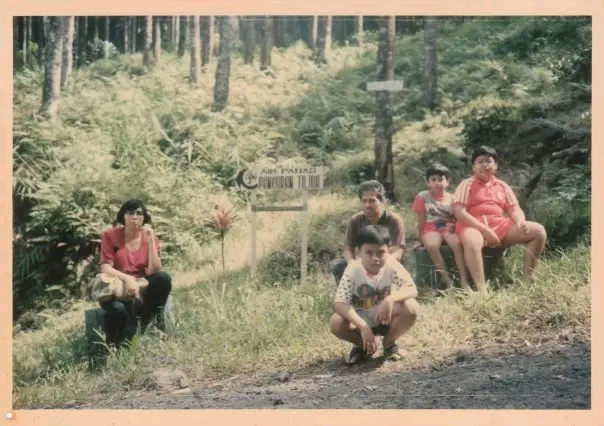
Pancuran Tujuh in the Orde Baru time

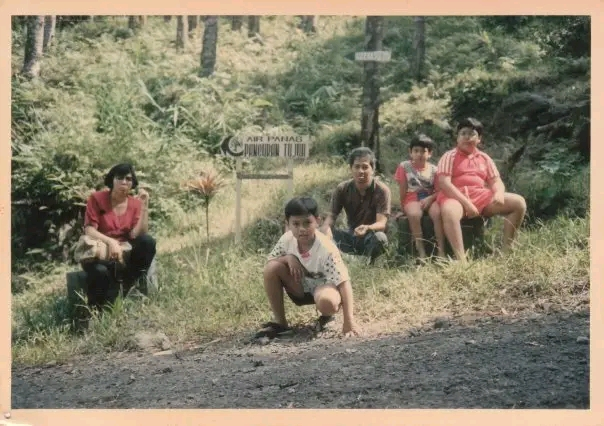
Pancuran Tujuh in the era of Presiden Suharto

== Works cited ==
- Ayyubi, Saladin (4 November 2013). "Menikmati Sensasi Pijat Belerang Pancuran Tujuh Gunung Slamet" [Enjoying the Sensation of Sulfur Massages at Pancuran Tujuh, Mount Slamet]. OkeZone (in Indonesian). Archived from the original on 2 April 2015.
- Banyumas Regency (brochure) (in Indonesian), Ministry of Youth, Sports, Culture, and Tourism, 2014
- Hajar, Ibnu (December 2003). "Potensi dan Pemanfaatan Air Panas Pancuran Tujuh di Kawasan Wana Wisata Batu Raden Jawa Tengah" [Potency and Utilization of Hot Water 'Pancuran Tujuh' in Batu Raden Forest Tourism Area, Central Java] (PDF). Rimba Kalimantan (in Indonesian). 11 (1). Mulawarman University: 10–16. ISSN 1412-2014. Archived from the original (PDF) on 2 April 2015.
- "Pancuran Pitu, Di Kaki Gunung Slamet" [Pancuran Pitu, On the Foot of Mount Slamet]. Voice of Indonesia (in Indonesian). 28 December 2013. Archived from the original on 2 April 2015.
- Septiana, Ietha Arni (2 January 2015). "Legenda Pancuran Pitu di Baturraden" [Legend of Pancuran Pitu in Baturraden]. Detik.com (in Indonesian). Archived from the original on 2 April 2015.
- Soeparno, Anton (26 February 2004). "Gua-gua di Pancuran Tujuh Harus 'Bersih'" [The Caves at Pancuran Tujuh Must Be 'Clean']. Suara Merdeka (in Indonesian). Archived from the original on 24 September 2015.
