= Jenderal Soedirman University =

Public university in Indonesia

Coordinates: 6.889852°S 107.609968°E

- Universitas Jenderal Soedirman ꦲꦸꦤꦶꦮ꦳ꦼꦂꦱꦶꦠꦱ꧀ꦗꦺꦤ꧀ꦢꦼꦫꦭ꧀ꦱꦸꦢꦶꦂꦩꦤ꧀
- Motto: Maju Terus, Pantang Mundur, Tak Kenal Menyerah
- Motto in English: Always Moving Ahead, No Retreat, Never Give Up
- Type: Public university
- Established: 1963
- Affiliations: ABEST21, SEAMEO BIOTROP
- Rector: Prof. Dr. Ir. Akhmad Sodiq, M.Sc.Agr. (2022-2027)
- Academic staff: 1,055; S1 - 181 - 17.16% S2 - 732 - 69.38% S3 - 142 - 13.46%
- Students: 23,898
- Undergraduates: 23,443
- Postgraduates: 409
- Doctoral students: 46
- Location: Purwokerto, Central Java, Indonesia
- Campus: Urban: Grendeng, Karangwangkal, Berkoh, Kalibakal Campus (Purwokerto) Rural: Blater Campus (Purbalingga) Total: 850,000 m^{2}/210 acre
- Colors: Yellow
- Nickname: Unsoed
- Mascot: Soedirman
- Website: www.unsoed.ac.id

Jenderal Soedirman University (Indonesian: Universitas Jenderal Soedirman, Javanese: ꦲꦸꦤꦶꦮ꦳ꦼꦂꦱꦶꦠꦱ꧀ꦗꦺꦤ꧀ꦢꦼꦫꦭ꧀ꦱꦸꦢꦶꦂꦩꦤ꧀, abbreviated as Unsoed) is a public university located in Purwokerto, Banyumas Regency, Central Java, Indonesia and was established on September 23, 1963. The university named after Jenderal Soedirman (English: General Soedirman), the first commander-in-chief of the Indonesian Army during the country's fight for independence to commemorate his service for the Indonesian nation. He was born in the Banyumas region.

Due to its location nearby to Mount Slamet and Purwokerto as a relatively small city, Unsoed is mostly preferred by students because of its cold and comfortable environment and provides an affordable living costs for university students in general.

== History ==
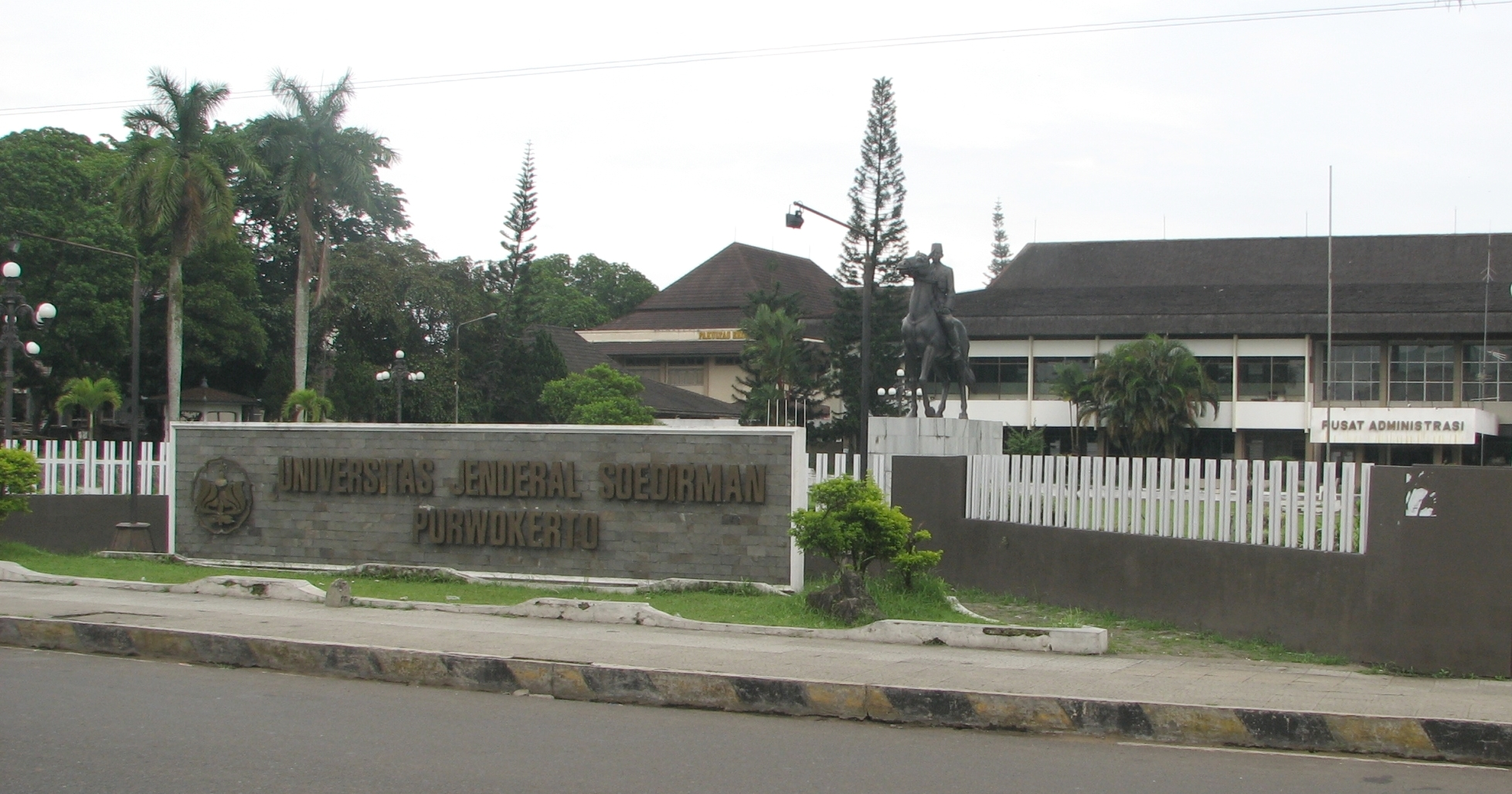
Statue of Jenderal Soedirman mounting on a horse. Behind: Central Administration Office, located in Grendeng Campus.

In the 1960s, the highest education facilities in Banyumas residency was senior high schools, includes general and vocational schools. Meanwhile, local Banyumas society became more interested in higher education; the lack of higher education institutions in the region meant that fresh high school graduates went outside the region if they wanted to get a degree. Hampered by the high cost of living outside the region, only students from wealthy families could afford it.

This sparked the idea to establish a university in the region. The first step was the creation of agriculture faculty establishment board on February 10, 1961, followed by the establishment of Jenderal Soedirman University foundation on November 20, 1961. The faculty of agriculture was the first faculty established on September 20, 1962, under cooperation with Diponegoro University.

The Faculty of Agriculture was the precursor to establish Jenderal Soedirman University with more faculty and administration systems. On November 27, 1963, a ceremony was held in a Banyumas residential house to formally established the Jenderal Soedirman University. The official launching was conducted by the Minister of PTIP, Dr. Tojib Hadiwidjaja. This establishment was possible with aid from other educational institutions, PTIP Department (now Dikti), provincial government of Central Java and leaders of the Indonesian armed forces.

When established, Unsoed only had three faculties: Faculty of Agriculture, Faculty of Economics and Business, and Faculty of Biology. On its development, Unsoed established another new faculties, mainly: Faculty of Animal Husbandry (1966), Faculty of Law (1982), Faculty of Social and Political Science (1993), Postgraduate Program (1994), Faculty of Medicine (2001), Faculty of Mathematics and Natural Science (2007), Faculty of Engineering (2009), Faculty of Health Sciences (2014), Faculty of Humanities (2014), and Faculty of Fishery and Marine Science (2014).

Universitas Jenderal Soedirman is the oldest and one of the only public university in the former Banyumas Residency. Thus affecting the student composition, from 25,782 of total active students in 2008, students from local Banyumas region accounted for almost 35% while the rest are from other regions in Indonesia as far as Sumatera and Sulawesi. About 5000 students enrolled at the university every year. Universitas Jenderal Soedirman is also considered as one of the most preferred university in national college entrance due to its competitiveness to enter select departments/faculties. In 2016, Unsoed ranked number 16 in Indonesia and accredited as grade-A university in 2018. In 2020, Unsoed ranked 14th as a favorite university in SBMPTN conducted by LTMPT. In 2021, Unsoed achieved rank number 17 as the best university in Indonesia according to Scimago Institutions Rankings (SIR) and successfully positioned in Top 20 of the best universities in Indonesia. Unsoed has a goal and ambitions to pursue local wisdom development and is also known as Kampus Berbasis Kearifan Lokal and committed to be a "World Class Civic University".

== Identity ==
=== Name ===
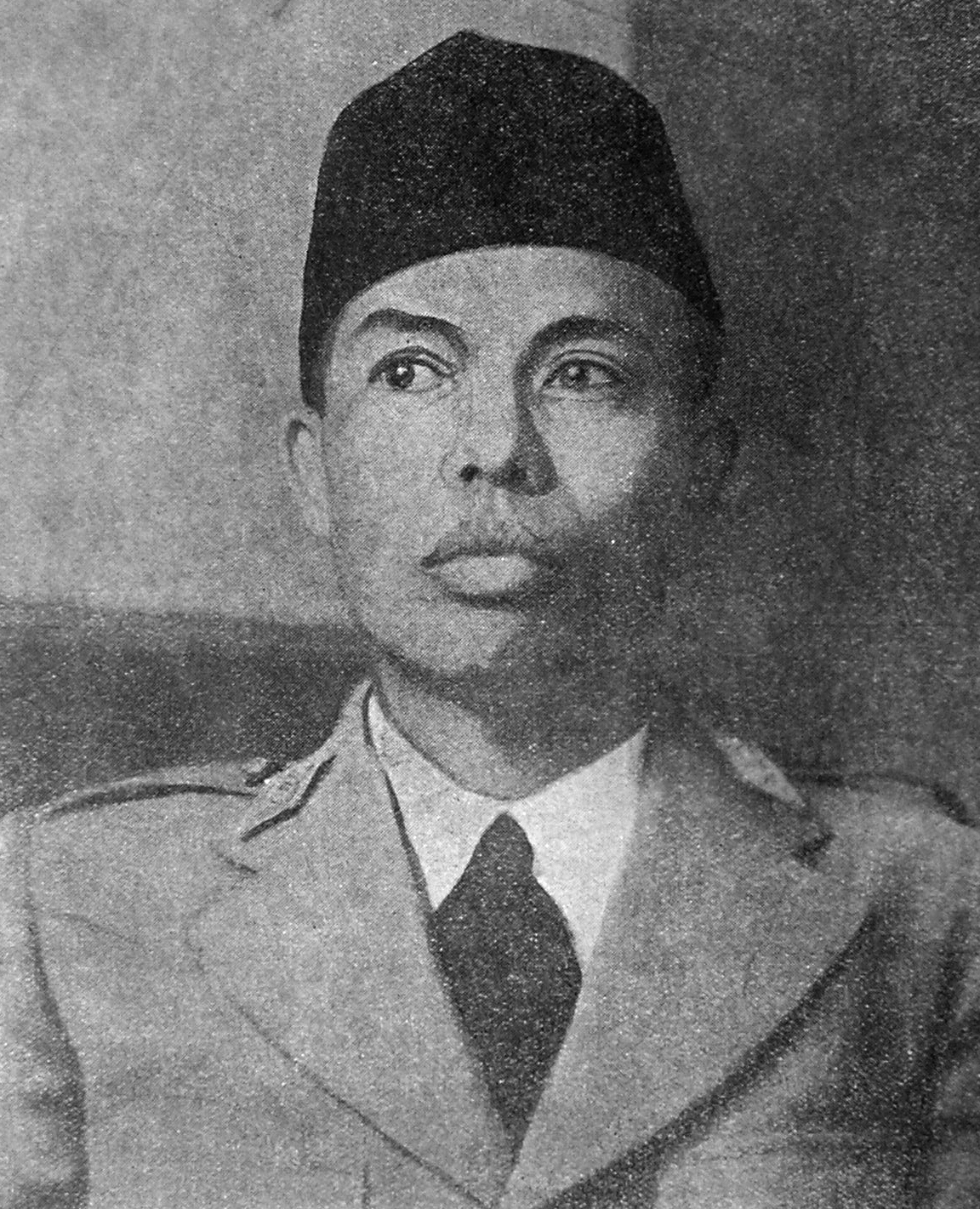
Portrait of General Soedirman.

The name "Jenderal Soedirman" in Jenderal Soedirman University is a concept of honorary to the Great Commander-In-Chief Soedirman as an Indonesian national hero who was born in former Banyumas Residency region (now Purbalingga Regency).

== Faculties and departments ==
Undergraduate programs (sarjana) and vocational programs (diploma) are held under 12 faculties.

Cluster of Science and Technology

- Faculty of Medicine
- Faculty of Health Sciences
- Faculty of Mathematics and Natural Sciences
- Faculty of Engineering
- Faculty of Fishery and Marine Sciences
- Faculty of Biology
- Faculty of Animal Husbandry
- Faculty of Agriculture

Cluster of Social and Humanities

- Faculty of Economics and Business
- Faculty of Law
- Faculty of Social and Political Science
- Faculty of Humanities

== Campuses ==
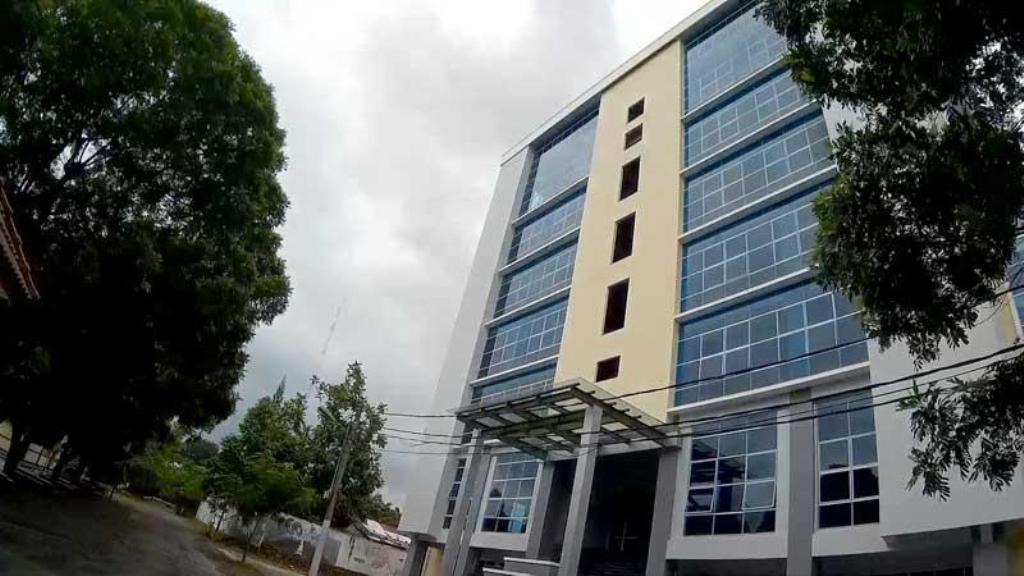
Integrated Laboratory Building, Faculty of Economics and Business, Grendeng Campus.

=== Grendeng ===
Grendeng campus serves as the central part of Unsoed, located in Jalan H.R. Boenyamin and Jalan Kampus. This campus is dedicated for three faculties in the cluster of social science: Faculty of Law, Faculty of Social and Political Science, and Faculty of Economics and Business. Grendeng campus is the home for important buildings in Unsoed, such as Rectory, Central Administration Office, University Central Library, Graha Widyatama Prof. Rubijanto Misman Auditorium, Nurul Ulum University Mosque, Institute of Learning Development and Quality Assurance, Institute of Technology and Informatics Development, Procurement Unit Office, and Student Admission Office.

Beside that, Grendeng campus also accommodates other activity by providing several amenities like Soemardjito Convention Center, Unsoed Press, and Lecturer's Residence.

Another project being built in Grendeng Campus is a recently planned campus hotel, Unsoed Inn, which is still in progress since 2020.

=== Karangwangkal ===
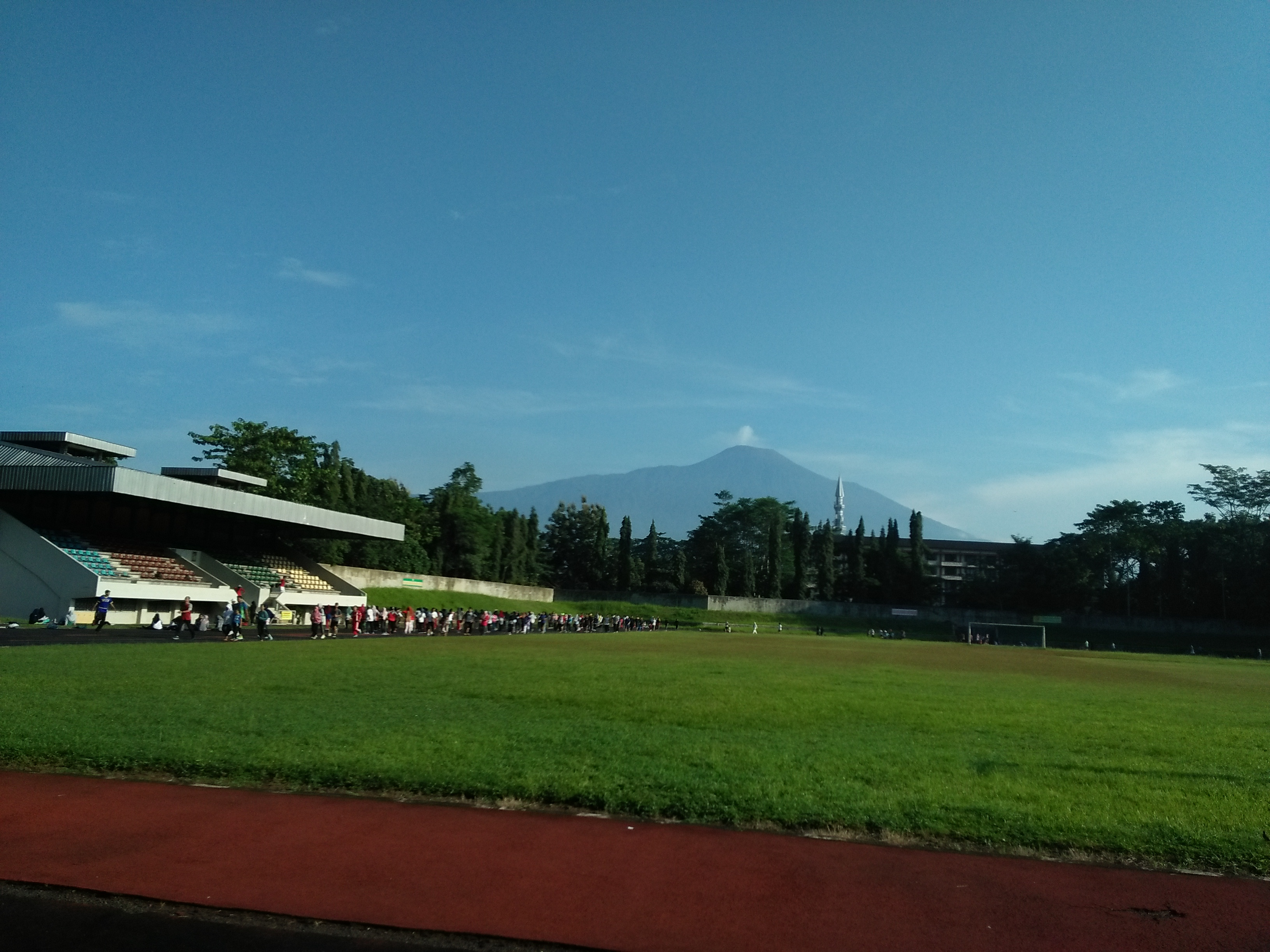
Soesilo Soedarman Stadium and Mount Slamet in the background.

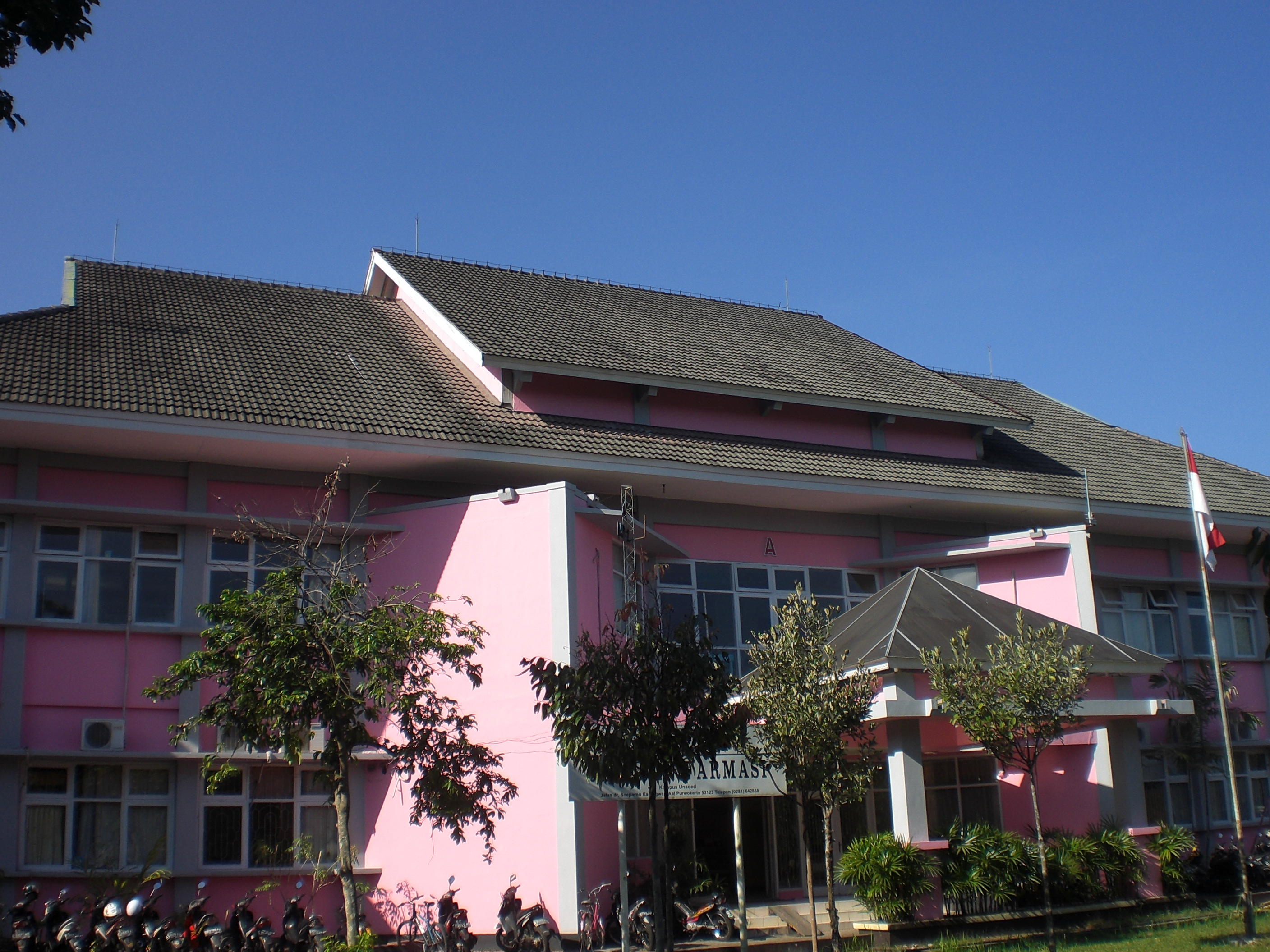
Department of Nursing, Faculty of Health Sciences, Karangwangkal campus.

Karangwangkal campus located in Jalan Dr. Soeparno, mostly serve as home for faculties dedicated in the cluster of science and technology: Faculty of Biology, Faculty of Health Sciences, Department of Dentistry, Faculty of Mathematics and Natural Sciences, Faculty of Fisheries and Marine Science, Faculty of Animal Husbandry, Faculty of Agriculture, Faculty of Humanities, and School of Postgraduate Programs.

Most of Unsoed's major facility is located in Karangwangkal campus, mainly: Soesilo Soedarman Sports Complex, Wisma Soedirman (dormitory), Unsoed Dental and Oral Hospital, Experimental Farm, Unsoed Student Activity Center, Institute of Research and Community Service, and Integrated Academic Building that serves as shared laboratory and classrooms.

=== Blater ===
Blater is the farthest campus in Unsoed, home for Faculty of Engineering, which located in the Purbalingga Regency, roughly 21 km away from Purwokerto. Blater campus' land is originally a gift from local government of Purbalingga that requests Unsoed to build a faculty dedicated to that city as an attempt to advance local engineering education and provide easier access and opportunity to higher education for Purbalingga local citizens. Faculty of Engineering began operation in 2007 (originally in 2000 as a program) under the name Department of Engineering, Faculty of Science and Engineering (split from Faculty of Mathematics and Natural Sciences) and operates independently in 2014 after becoming its own faculty.

=== Berkoh ===
Berkoh campus serves Faculty of Medicine, located in Jalan Dr. Gumbreg, this campus is closely related to Margono Soekarjo Regional Hospital complex. This campus contains three main buildings, Gedung A (classrooms for 1-3 semester student), Gedung B (classrooms for 5-7 semester student), Gedung C (dean's office, laboratory, OSCE lab, SOCA lab, Hall, and educational service office).

=== Kalibakal ===
Kaliabakal campus is the home for Department of Dentistry, Faculty of Medicine, Klinik Pratama Soedirman, and laboratories.

== Research and innovation ==
- Evaporative drying for animal sperm storage, an innovation by Dr. Mulyoto Pangestu, lecturer at Faculty of Animal Husbandry (now lecturing at Monash University, Australia) to accommodate an affordable way to preserve farm animal sperm other than expensive nitrogen-based preservation.
- Padi Gogo Aromatik Unsoed-1, a type of superior rice breed developed by joint researchers, one of them is Prof. Dr. Ir. Soewarto, M.S. (ex-rector), that yields high-quality grains and able to withstand dry agricultural areas.
- Orange quality automated detector, a development conducted by Susanto Budi Sulistyo, Dr. Siswantoro, Ir. Agus Margiwiyatno, Ir. Masrukhi, Dr. Asna Mustofa, Arief Sudarmaji, Rifah Ediati, Riana Listanti, Hety Handayani Hidayat, using an affordable near-infrared AS7263 based technology to determine quality of oranges.

== Achievement ==
- Ranked 17th in Indonesia at SCImago Institutions Rankings in 2021.
- 2nd position at Anugerah Humas Dikti kategori Badan Layanan Umum in 2020.
- Ranked 16th at Pemeringkatan Dikti, Ministry of Research and Higher Education in 2016.

== Notable alumni ==
- Hernani Filomena Coelho da Silva, Minister of Petroleum of East Timor
- Albertina Ho, career woman judge at Supreme Court of the Republic of Indonesia
- Rustiningsih, Vice Governor of Central Java in 2008–2013
- Mahyudin, Deputy Speaker of MPR in 2014–2019
- Ahmad Tohari, Indonesian author and humanist, famously known for his trilogy work Ronggeng Dukuh Paruk and filmed in Sang Penari
- Agung Widiyantoro, regent of Brebes (2011–2012), member of parliament DPR RI (2014–2019)
