= Baturraden =

District in Central Java Province, Indonesia

Coordinates: 7°18′42.79″S 109°13′41.24″E

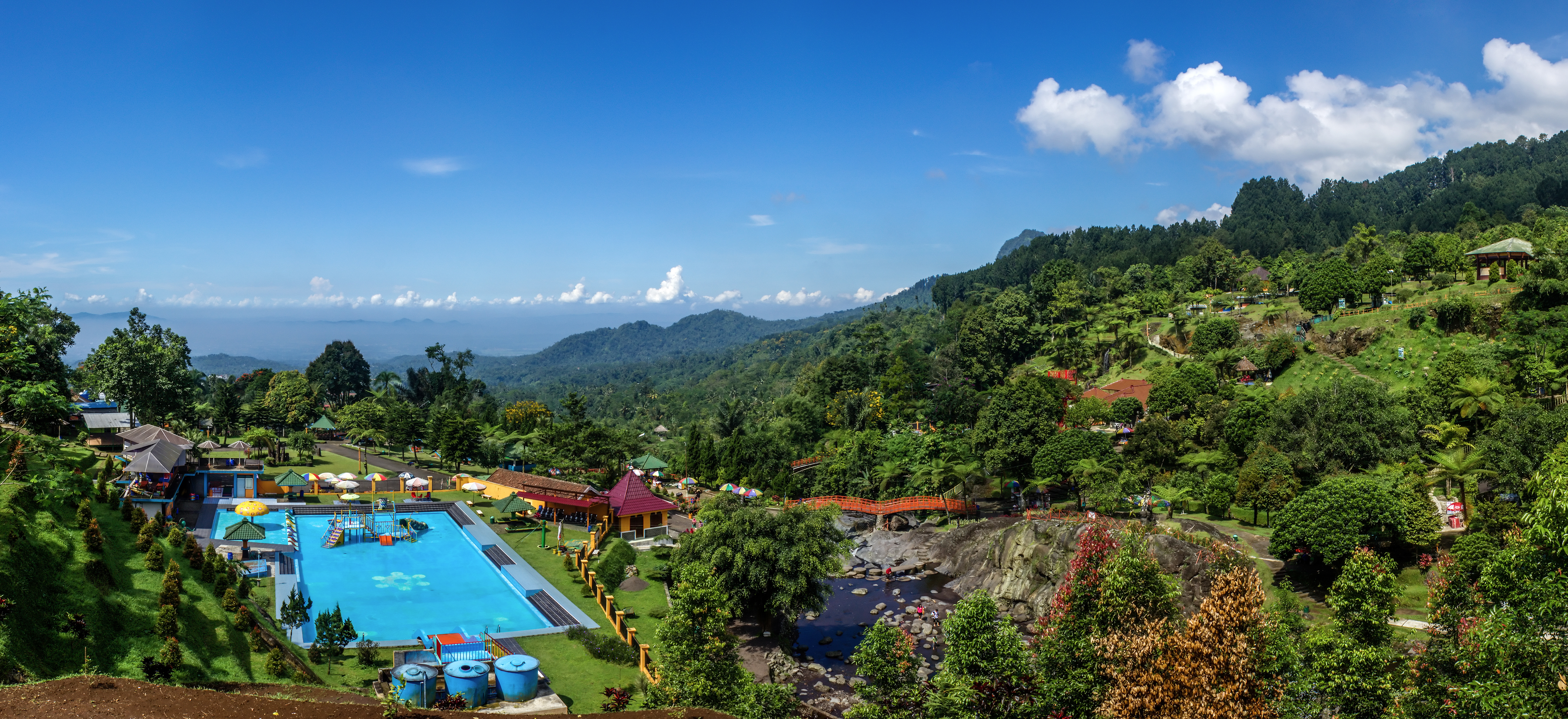
View of the Baturraden tourist area

Baturraden (also spelled Baturaden) is an administratrive district (kecamatan) in the Banyumas Regency on the slope of Mount Slamet, in Central Java Province of Indonesia. It features panoramic views, waterfalls, a mini-train, paddleboats, a water slide, and a pool. Its name is derived from a legend about star-crossed lovers, a manservant (Batur) and a noblewoman (Raden).

== Location ==
Baturraden is located on the slopes of Mount Slamet in Banyumas Regency, Central Java, at about 640 metres (2,100 ft) above sea level. The area is some 6 kilometres (3.7 mi) from the peak of the mountain; this has led to the number of visitors decreasing when the volcano is active. Administratively it is part of Rempoah Village, in the Baturraden District.

Baturraden is 14 kilometres (8.7 mi) north of the town of Purwokerto, a trip that generally takes 30 minutes by car. Minibuses, which let passengers off at the Baturraden district terminal, are also available from the city.

== Etymology ==
The name Baturraden is derived from the Javanese words Batur ("manservant") and Raden ("nobleman/noblewoman"). According to local legend, the young daughter of a local king fell in love with a young man who worked in the stables. As their feelings were mutual, the two furtively had a relationship before ultimately eloping, without their parents' blessings. Shortly after their first child was born, the noblewoman's father marched on their home with his army and demanded that she return home. When she refused, the king had the stableman stabbed with a kris. The noblewoman, in despair, took the kris from her husband's body and killed herself. The king, before leaving, had their child killed as well, and all were buried in the area.

== History ==
A simple suspension bridge in Baturraden collapsed in 2006 during the Eid al-Fitr holidays, killing nine and injuring dozens more. The accident was attributed to too much weight being on the bridge. A replacement bridge, made of concrete, was installed that year.

Between 1994 and 2009, Baturraden averaged 10,000 tourists annually. Tekad Santoso of the Association of the Baturraden Tourism Community attributed this low number to a lack of development and marketing, thus meaning that the full potential of natural tourism was not reached. Efforts were made to increase the number of visitors, and the area saw a 300 percent increase in tourists over the Christmas holidays of 2009. By 2014, an average of 3,000 visitors came every weekend. Many of the tourists who go to Baturraden are from the nearby cities of Purwokerto, Tegal, Pekalongan, Semarang, and Yogyakarta.

== Facilities ==
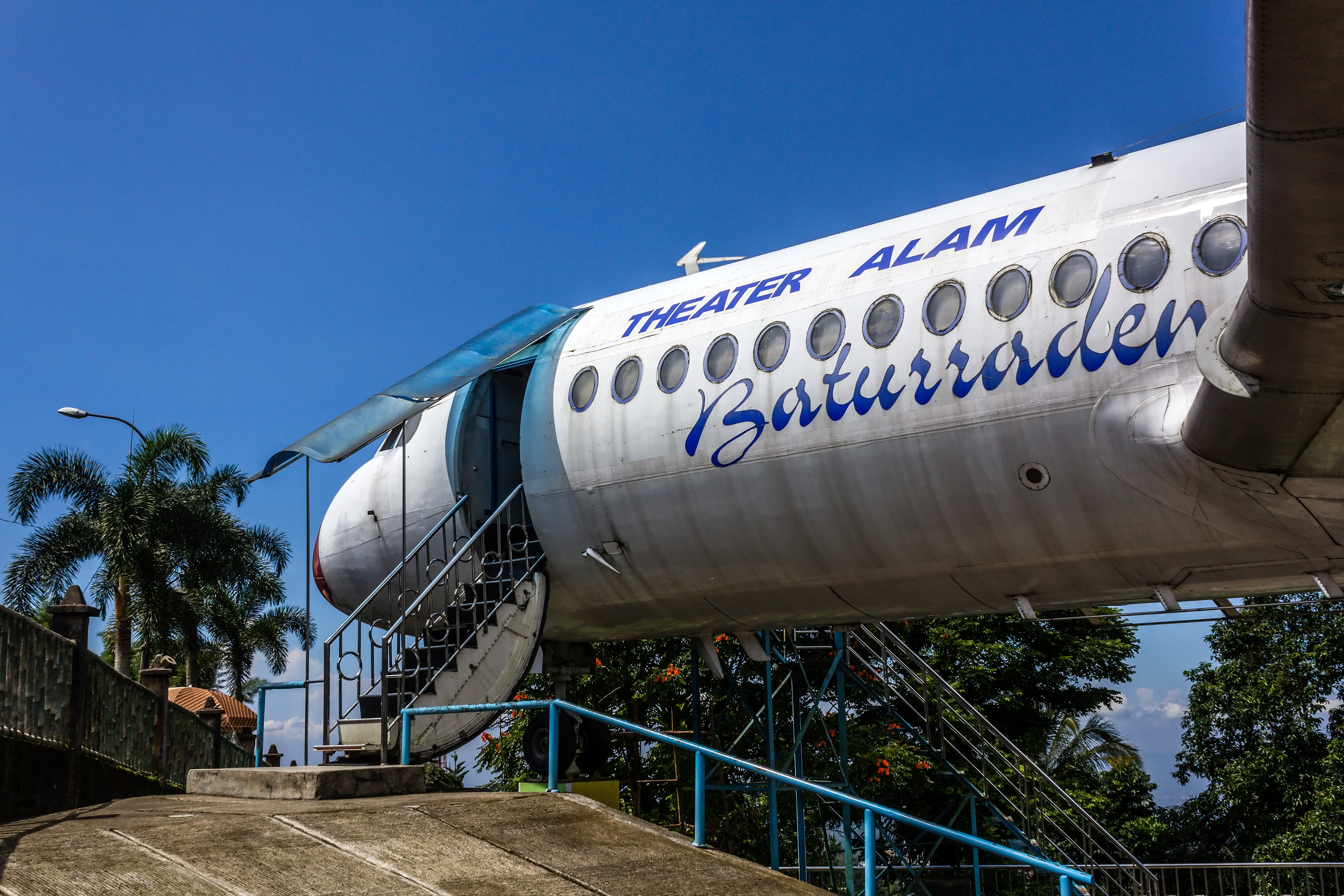
The "Theater Alam" in Baturraden

Baturraden is predominantly marketed for ecotourism. It offers views of Mount Slamet and the city of Purwokerto below. On-site is the Gumawang Waterfall, which measures 25 metres (82 ft) in height; it is common for local young people to jump from the top into the pool below, asking for money in exchange for the display. Near Baturraden is the hot spring of Pancuran Tujuh (2.5 kilometres (1.6 mi) to the west) and the pool of Telaga Sunyi (3 kilometres (1.9 mi) to the east); the former is accessible by foot from within the resort. Another hot spring, Pancuran Tiga, is located close to the resort and likewise accessible from within.

Baturraden has a variety of man-made attractions as well, including a mini-train, paddle boats, a water slide, and a pool. On-site there is a refurbished Fokker F28 Fellowship, purchased from Merpati Nusantara Airlines, which is used as a movie theater. Dubbed the "Theater Alam" (Nature Theater), it shows a variety of films about tourism. A statue of two nagas is found on the grounds, reflecting a local belief that two such creatures guard one of the natural pools. On certain days, cultural performances are held in Baturraden. These include the Grebeg Suro procession and the Kuda Lumping dance.

The area around Baturradden has numerous hotels, a total of 96 in 2013.

== Works cited ==
- Abdulrahman, Robin (2 May 2014). "Gunung Slamet Siaga, Pengunjung Baturaden Menurun" [Mount Slamet Awakens, the Number of Visitors to Baturaden Decreases] (in Indonesian). Radio Republik Indonesia. Archived from the original on 2 April 2015.
- Asdhiana, I Made (12 October 2014). "Gubernur Jateng: Baturraden Aman Dikunjungi Wisatawan" [Governor of Central Java: Baturraden is Safe for Tourists]. Kompas (in Indonesian). Archived from the original on 26 March 2015.
- Banyumas Regency (brochure) (in Indonesian), Ministry of Youth, Sports, Culture, and Tourism, 2014
- Baturraden Adventure in Paradise (brochure) (in Indonesian), Ministry of Youth, Sports, Culture, and Tourism, 2014
- "Baturraden Dipadati Pengunjung" [Baturraden Filled with Visitors]. Kompas (in Indonesian). 3 January 2010. Archived from the original on 2 April 2015.
- Maryono, Agus (19 June 2004). "Youths risks their lives at waterfall". The Jakarta Post. Archived from the original on 2 April 2015.
- Maryono, Agus (13 June 2009). "Tourism fails to develop at Baturraden resort: PMPB". The Jakarta Post. Archived from the original on 23 July 2009.
- "Menyatu Dengan Alam di Wisata Baturaden" [Becoming One with Nature in Baturaden]. Suara Merdeka (in Indonesian). 25 September 2014. Archived from the original on 26 March 2015.
- Sutar MB (22 August 2011). "Numpak Pesawat Fokker 28 ing Loka Wisata Baturaden" [Riding a Fokker 28 at the Baturaden Tourist Resort]. Panjebar Semangat (in Javanese). Archived from the original on 26 March 2015.
- Yulistara, Arina (7 November 2013). "Romeo-Juliet Ala Banyumas & Asal Muasal Nama Baturraden" [Romeo–Juliet a la Banyumas, and the Origin of the Name Baturraden]. Detik.com (in Indonesian). Archived from the original on 26 March 2015.
- Yulistara, Arina (8 November 2013). "Inilah Jembatan Penuh Tragedi di Baturraden" [This is the Tragic Bridge in Baturraden]. Detik.com (in Indonesian). Archived from the original on 12 November 2013.
