= Banyumasan =

Banyumasan may refer to:

- Banyumas Javanese, a specific dialect of Javanese spoken by Banyumas Javans
- Banyumas Javans, a Javanese ethnic group native to Banyumas
- Banyumas Regency, regency in Java, Indonesia
