= Purwokerto =

City and capital of Banyumas Regency, Indonesia

Purwokerto ꦥꦸꦂꦮꦏꦼꦂꦠ
- Regency capital
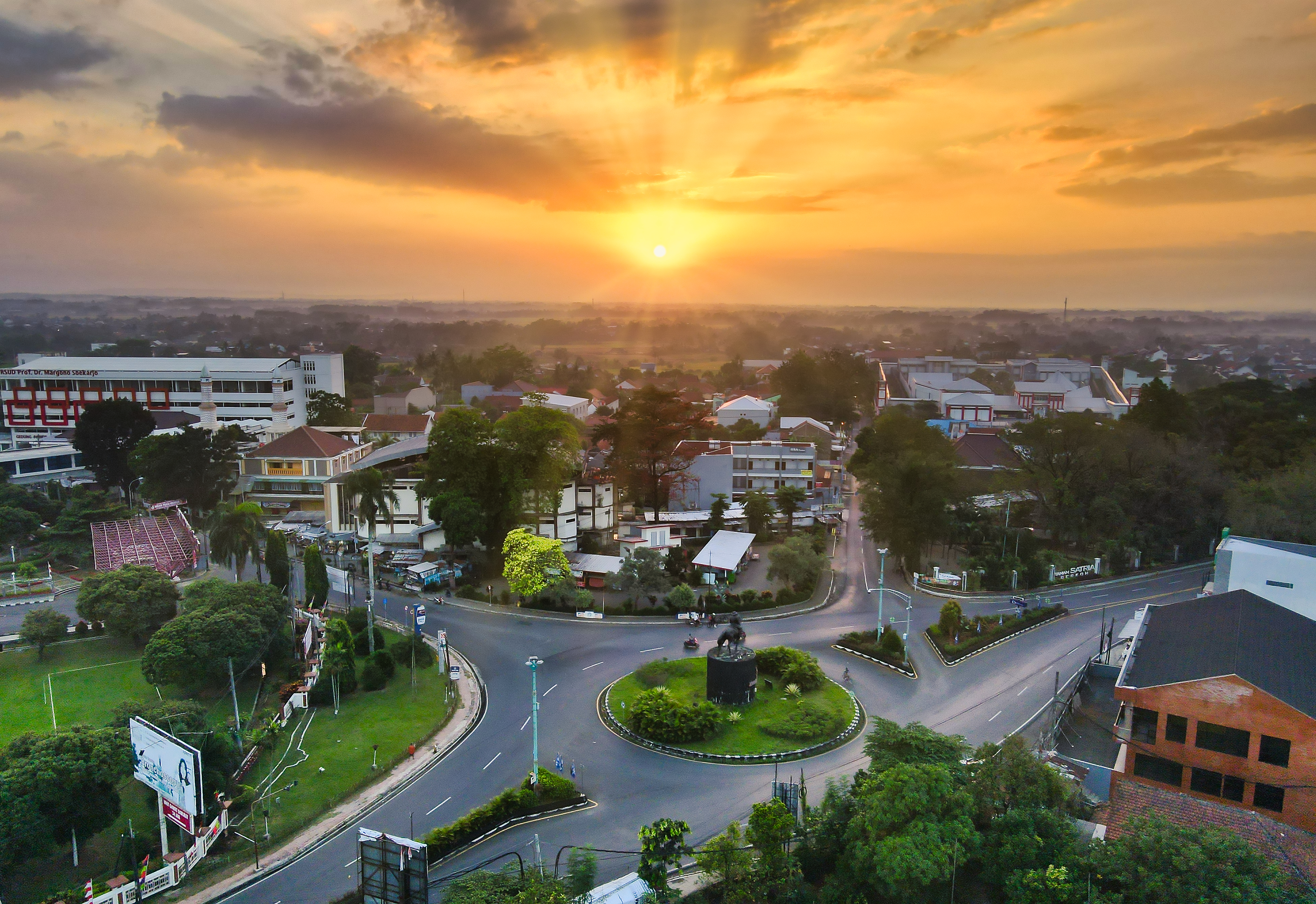
- General Gatot Subroto Monument in Purwokerto

- Location within Java Location within Indonesia
- Coordinates: 7°25′40″S 109°14′30″E
- Country: Indonesia
- Province: Central Java
- Regency: Banyumas Regency

Government

Area
  - Total: 38.58 km^{2} (14.90 sq mi)
- Elevation: 183.87 m (603.2 ft)
- Highest elevation: 286 m (938 ft)
- Lowest elevation: 71 m (233 ft)

Population (mid 2025 estimate)
  - Total: 237,940
  - Density: 6,167/km^{2} (15,970/sq mi)
- Time zone: UTC+7 (WIB)
- Area code: 0281
- Website: www.banyumaskab.go.id

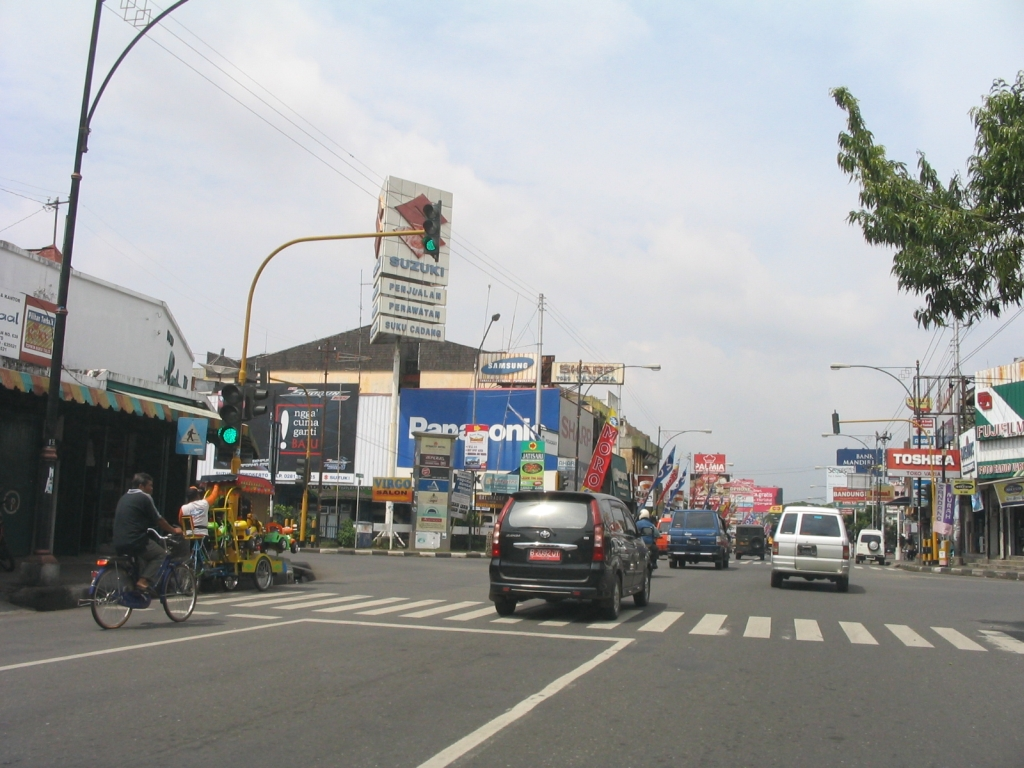
Purwokerto main street

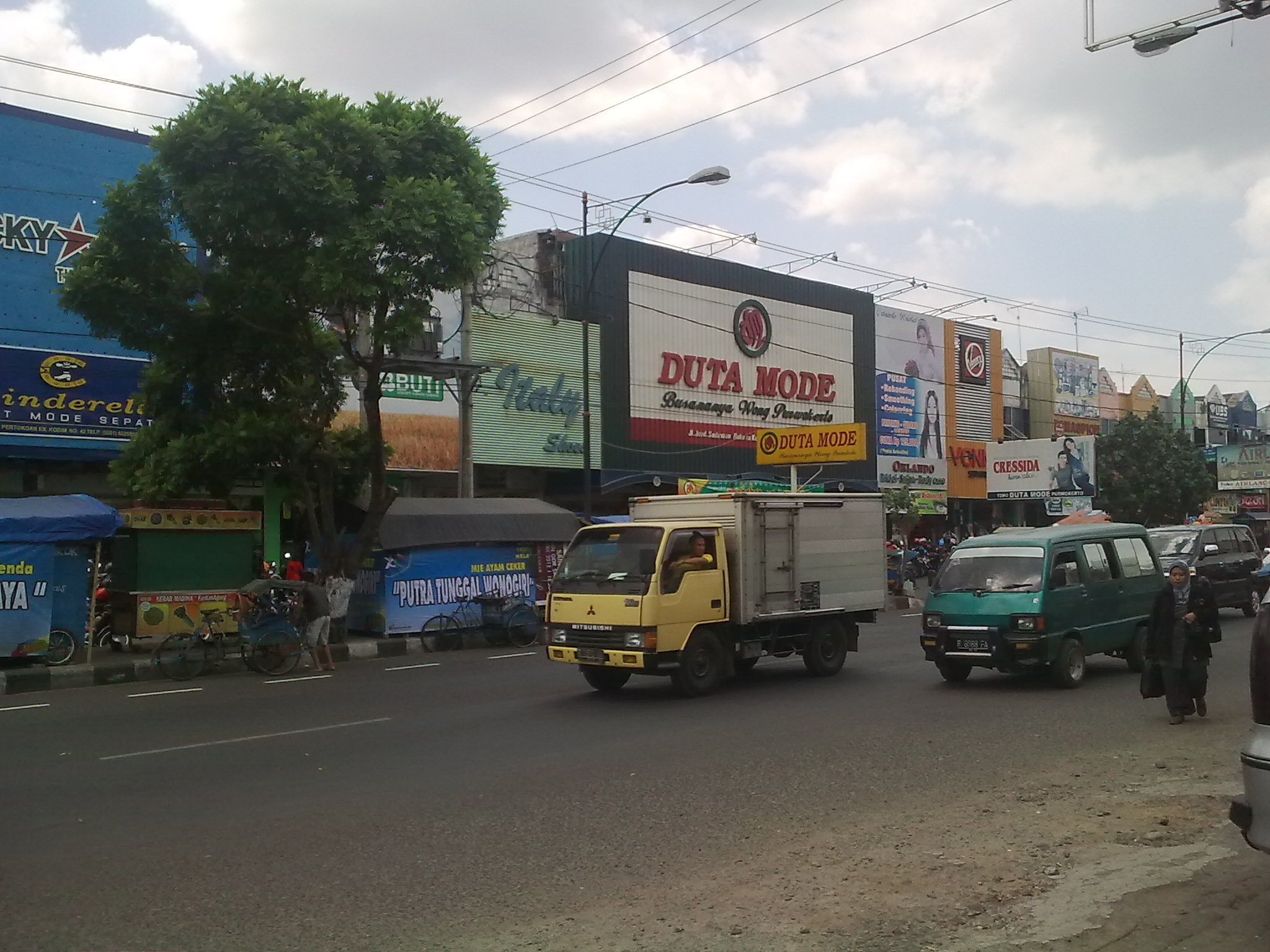
A row of shops in Purwokerto

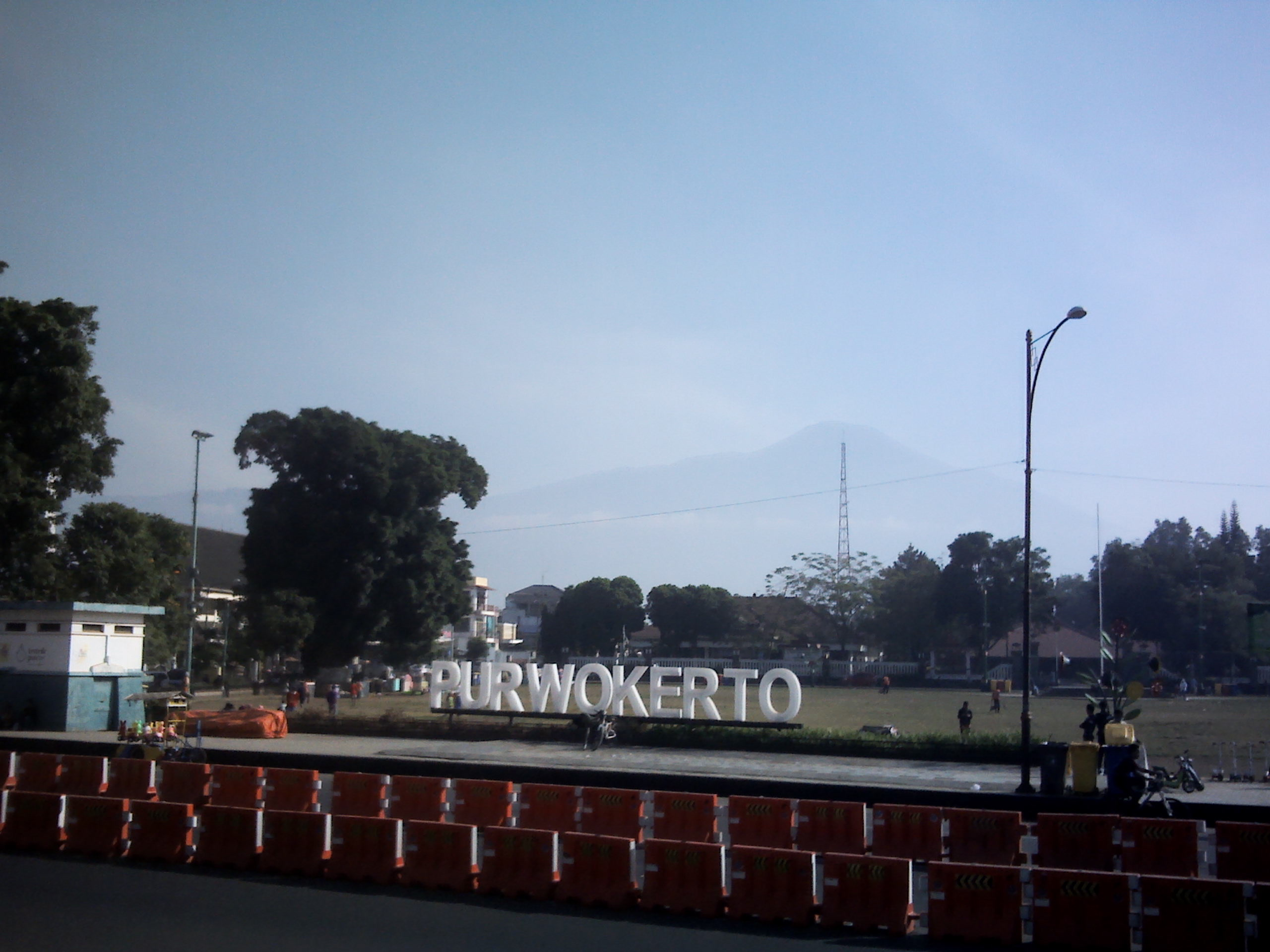
Alun alun Purwokerto

Purwokerto (Javanese: ꦥꦸꦂꦮꦏꦼꦂꦠ, romanized: Purwåkertå) is a large but non-autonomous town on the island of Java, Indonesia. It is the coordinating centre of local government (Bakorwil 3) and the largest city in southwestern Central Java (known as the Barlingmascakeb region). Currently, Purwokerto is the capital of Banyumas Regency, Central Java province. The population of the four districts which comprise the town at the 2010 census was 233,951 and 229,271 at the 2020 census; the official estimate as of mid 2025 was 237,940. The built-up area of Purwokerto extends beyond these four administrative districts into parts of surrounding districts - notably Sukaraja and Kembaran Districts to the east, Sumbang, Baturraden and Kedungbanteng Districts to the north, and Karanglewas and Cilonggok Districts to the west; and it has a metropolitan area population of 416,964 at the 1990 Census.

== Geography ==
Purwokerto is located in the middle of Java Island within the province of Central Java, near the base of Mount Slamet, the second-tallest mountain in Java. The average elevation is 183.87 metres, maximum 286 m, and minimum 71 metres above sea level. The city is bisected by the Kali Kranji (Kranji River). It lies near two major east–west roads, Sudirman Street and Gatot Subroto Street. Its geographic location is 7°26′S 109°14′E.

=== Climate ===
Purwokerto has a tropical rainforest climate (Af) with moderate rainfall in July and August and heavy to very heavy rainfall in the remaining months.

Climate data for Purwokerto Tengah (elevation 184 m or 604 ft), Purwokerto, Central Java, Indonesia
Month	Jan	Feb	Mar	Apr	May	Jun	Jul	Aug	Sep	Oct	Nov	Dec	Year
Record high °C (°F)	31 (88)	32 (90)	32 (90)	33 (91)	31 (88)	30 (86)	30 (86)	31 (88)	32 (90)	33 (91)	33 (91)	31 (88)	33 (91)
Mean daily maximum °C (°F)	29.3 (84.7)	29.8 (85.6)	30.4 (86.7)	30.2 (86.4)	29.7 (85.5)	29.1 (84.4)	28.7 (83.7)	29.1 (84.4)	29.8 (85.6)	30.4 (86.7)	30.3 (86.5)	29.3 (84.7)	29.7 (85.4)
Daily mean °C (°F)	24.3 (75.7)	24.9 (76.8)	25.1 (77.2)	25.1 (77.2)	24.3 (75.7)	23.8 (74.8)	23.5 (74.3)	24.3 (75.7)	25.1 (77.2)	25.2 (77.4)	25.0 (77.0)	24.4 (75.9)	24.6 (76.2)
Mean daily minimum °C (°F)	20.5 (68.9)	21.1 (70.0)	21.3 (70.3)	21.5 (70.7)	20.5 (68.9)	20.1 (68.2)	19.6 (67.3)	19.9 (67.8)	20.4 (68.7)	21.0 (69.8)	21.3 (70.3)	20.5 (68.9)	20.6 (69.1)
Record low °C (°F)	19 (66)	20 (68)	20 (68)	19 (66)	17 (63)	16 (61)	16 (61)	16 (61)	17 (63)	18 (64)	20 (68)	19 (66)	16 (61)
Average rainfall mm (inches)	405 (15.9)	388 (15.3)	386 (15.2)	330 (13.0)	235 (9.3)	163 (6.4)	158 (6.2)	173 (6.8)	250 (9.8)	363 (14.3)	396 (15.6)	411 (16.2)	3,658 (144)
Source: Climate-Data.org

== History ==
The history of Purwokerto as the capital of the Banyumas Regency is intertwined with the history of Banyumas itself. Banyumas was established in 1582 by Raden Joko Kahiman. He later became the first regent, Duke Mrapat.

=== The Sultanate of Pajang ===
Following the unintentional killing of Adipati Wirasaba VI in District Lowano (now Purworejo), Sultan Hadiwijaya summoned Joko Kahiman, the dead man's son in law. The Sultan made Kahiman "Adipati Wirasaba VII" (Regent of Wirasaba) and divided the Wirasaba regency into four parts. The Banjar region was given to Kyai Ngabei Wirayuda. The Meden territory was given to Kyai Ngabei Wirakusuma. The Wirasaba territory given to Kyai Ngabei Wargawijaya and the Kejawar territory was controlled by the Sultan himself. There, he cleared the Mangli forest and named the area "Banyumas". At that time, the capital of the Kejawar territory was in Banyumas. After the flood of 1861, the capital was moved to Purwokerto, which was located about 18 km further north.

== Administrative of Purwokerto ==
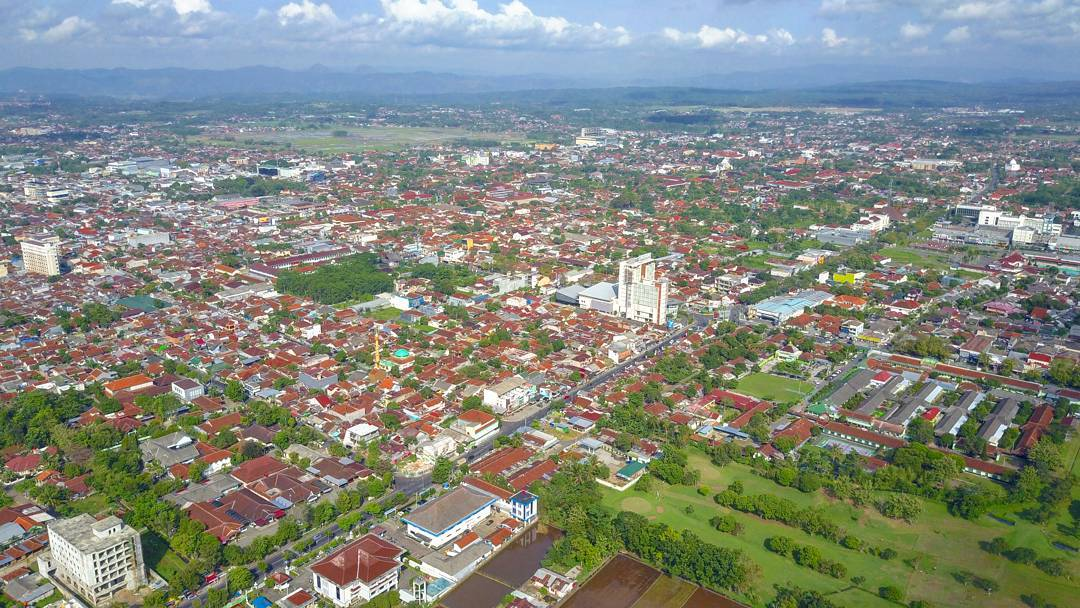
Purwokerto Aerial

Purwokerto used to be administratively equal to an "Administrative City" and it also used to have a Mayor (Walikotatif), as it has a special status as the capital of Banyumas Regency. Purwokerto is now divided into four administrative districts (kecamatan), each headed by a "Camat". These administrative municipalities of Purwokerto (and districts of Banyumas Regency) follow:

- South Purwokerto (Purwokerto Selatan) covers an area of 15.58 km^{2} and is the most populous district with a population of 75,606 people in mid 2025. Bulupitu's bus station and Taman Andang Pangrenan are here.
- East Purwokerto (Purwokerto Timur) covers an area of 8.39 km^{2}, with a population of 56,434 people in 2025. Main street; Jl.Jendral Sudirman, includes the city's landscape Pendopo Kabupaten and aloon aloon.
- West Purwokerto (Purwokerto Barat) covers an area of 7.99 km^{2}, with a population of 54,590 people in 2025. The main railway station (Stasiun Besar Daop V Purwokerto) is here.
- North Purwokerto (Purwokerto Utara) covers an area of 9.69 km^{2}, with a population of 51,310 people in 2025. Bordered with main destination place "Baturraden district", many residences and Jendral Sudirman University (Unsoed) are here, including most of the culinary places in the town.

If Purwokerto again became an autonomous city, now that it has 237,940 people, it would cover 38.58 km^{2} with 11 municipalities (kecamatan).

== Economy ==
Moro was a shopping centre in Purwokerto that operated from 1997 until 2023. It was declared bankrupt on 16 November 2023 and closed completely on 24 November 2023.

== Transport ==
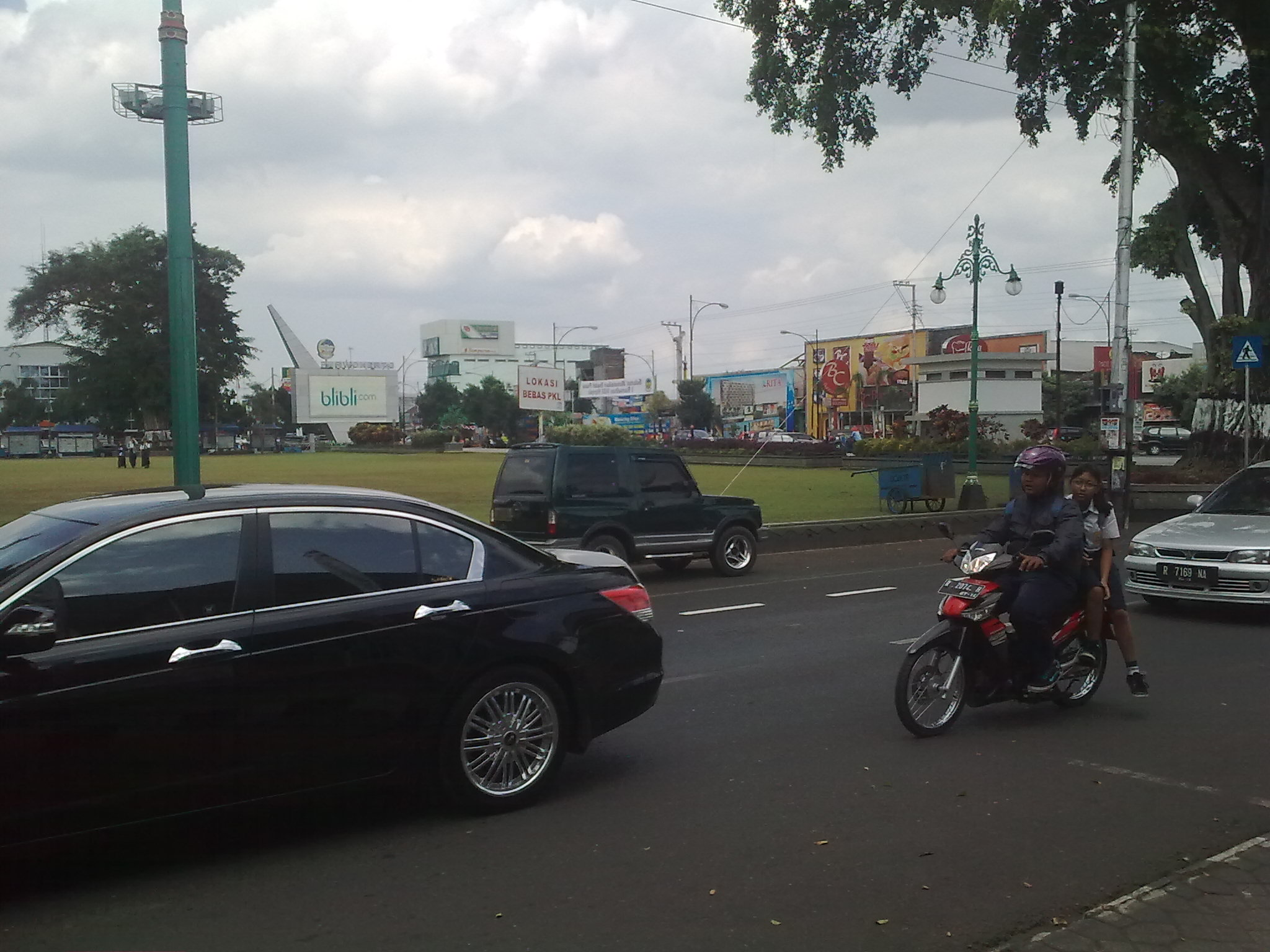
A street in Purwokerto

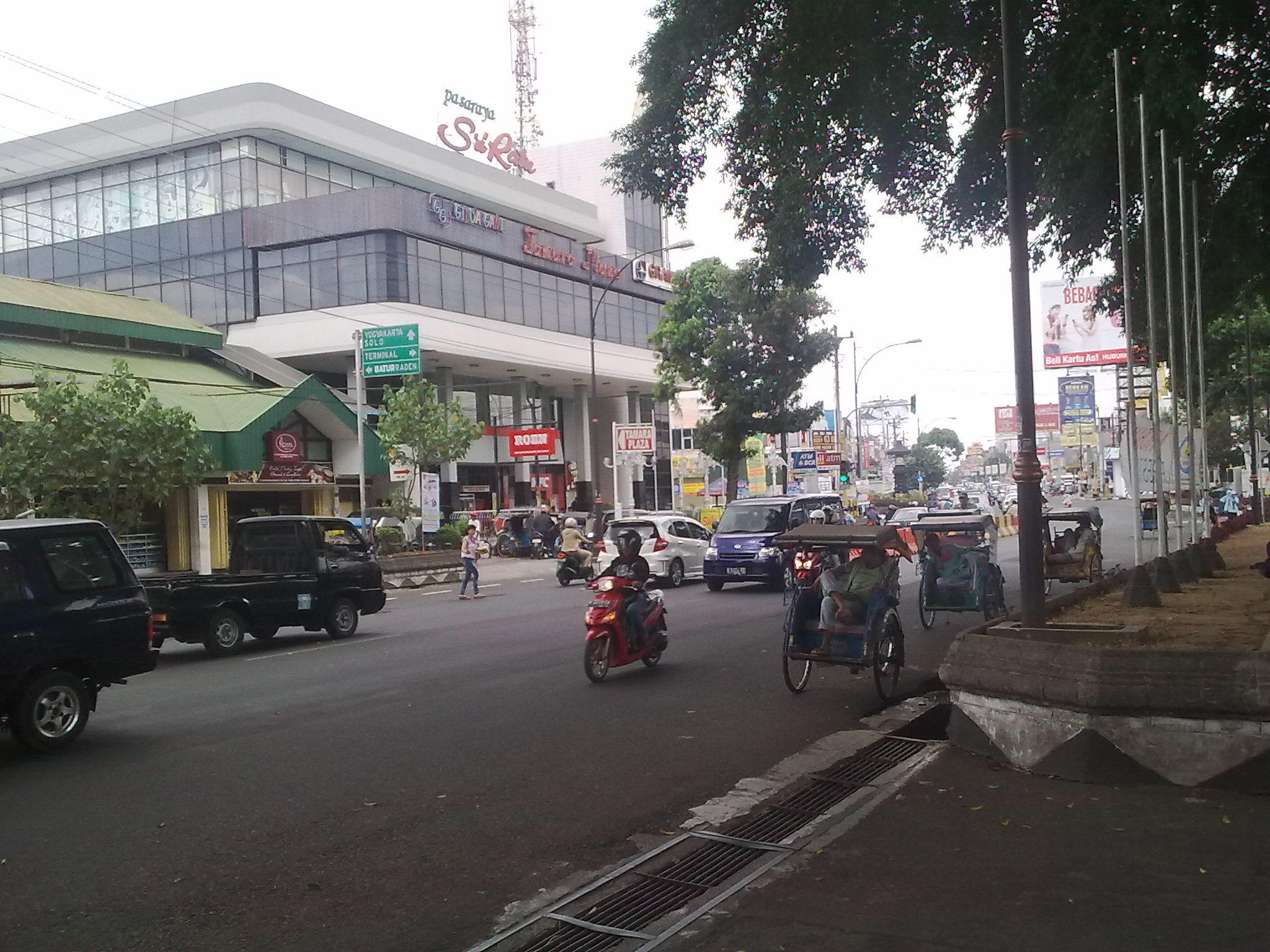
Jenderal Sudirman street in Purwokerto

=== Air ===
Purwokerto's nearest airport is the Tunggul Wulung Airport in Cilacap township, approximately 40 km south of Purwokerto. Tunggul Wulung has direct flights (three times per week) from Halim Perdana Kusuma airport in Jakarta. The travel time from Jakarta to Cilacap is 45 minutes. Lately in 2016 Wirasaba (PWL) is planned for commercial flight service. The distance to the town is about 15 km only. Many news sources state that this airport will be developed for commercial flight, while even Garuda Indonesia and Susi Air will be serving this route to Jakarta. Additionally, there is a new bridge that has been built by two regencies between Banyumas and Purbalingga, called Linggamas which supports it.

=== Railway ===
Purwokerto is a hub city connecting Cirebon to Jogjakarta. The train is one of the main modes of transport to Purwokerto. All classes of the ticket, from economy to first class, are available for trips on trains from Jakarta, Bandung, Yogyakarta, and Surabaya. The total journey from Jakarta is 6 hrs (first class) and 10 hrs (economy class). Soon in 2016, is being built double track between Purwokerto and Kroya for about 25 km the distance. It will be easier also faster the trip between two station above. Double track from Jakarta to Purwokerto now is fully serviced and it takes 5 hours only for single trip. There are 2 new destinations serviced by new train:

- Kamandaka services the potential passengers from Purwokerto, Bumiayu, Tegal to Semarang Tawang. There are 3 times trip for a single day.
- Joglokerto services the passengers from Purwokerto to Jogjakarta and ended in Solo
- Since February 2016, especially Purwojaya Train is available serving in all executive class (K-1)

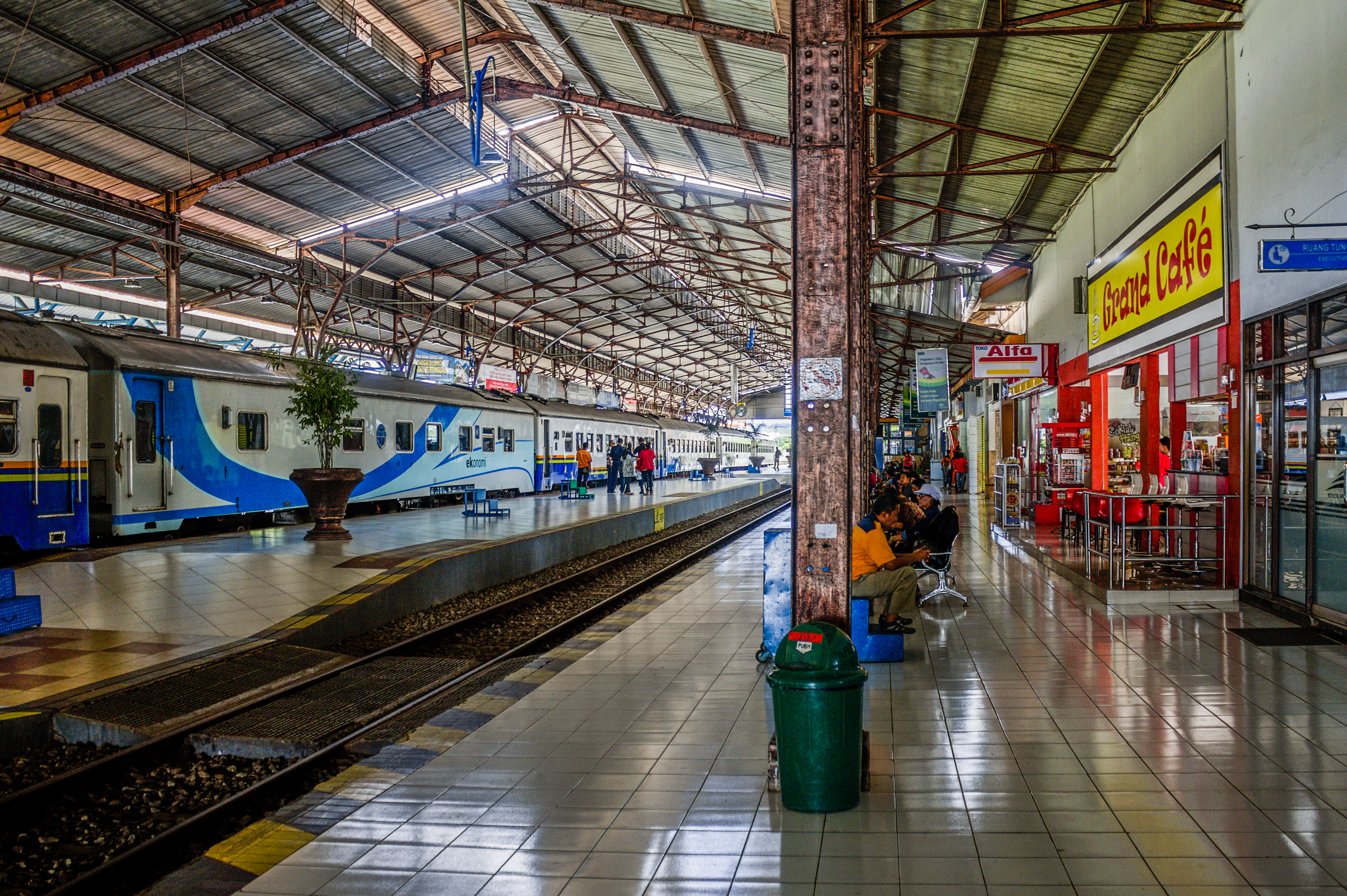
Interior view of Purwokerto station

=== Bus ===
Intercity buses connect Purwokerto to other cities on the island. The Purwokerto bus station is the third largest terminal in Central Java province after Terboyo (Semarang) and Tirtonadi (Surakarta). The Bulupitu's bus station services the passengers across the mainland to Bali/Lombok in the eastern also Banda Aceh (Sumatera) in the western. In 2016 will planned BRT system (Bus Rapid Transportation) serving between Purbalingga to Purwokerto. For more facilities now is built "Traffic Park" or Taman Lalu Lintas Bulupitu whereas becomes an education park for the public. This could be one of a little amount of additional bus station facilities in Indonesia. There is the first in Indonesia "Sleeper bus" serving Purbalingga/Purwokerto to Jakarta, which is a new facility where the beds are available inside and look just like a hotel's facility.

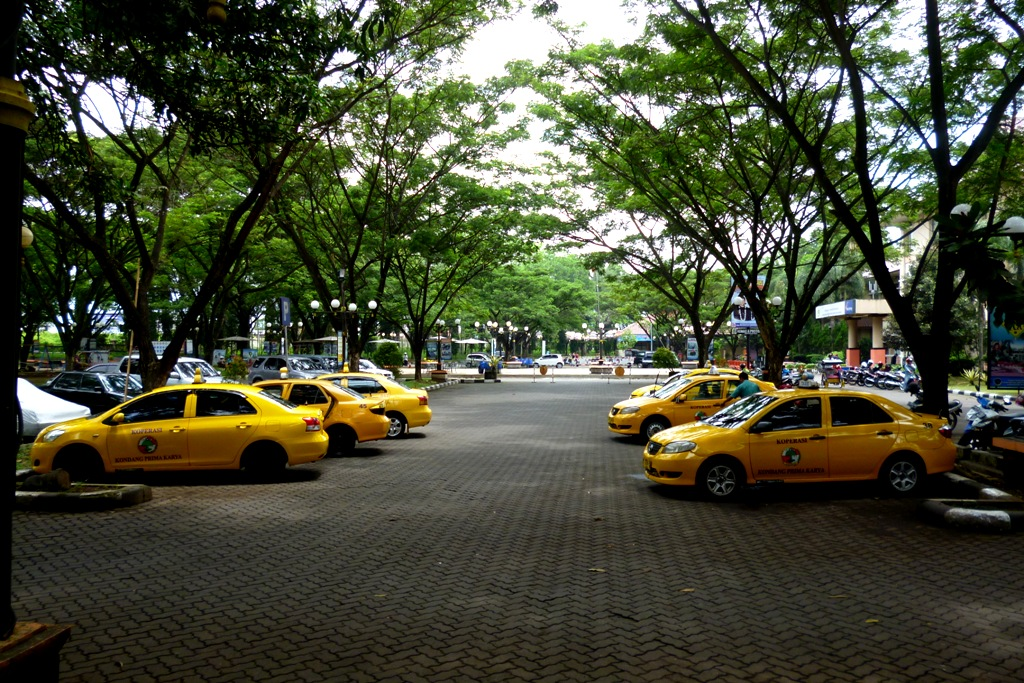
Terminal Bus Bulupitu - Purwokerto

== Places of interest ==
=== Alun-alun ===
Purwokerto's central public square, Indonesian: Alun-alun, has six banyan trees: a tree at each corner, and two in the center. The townsfolk often spend their leisure time in the shady square and it is a common place for children to play. Vendors in the square sell children's toys and local foods. On one side is the regional government building, Kabupaten. On the west side of the square is the Masjid Baitus Salam Mosque of Purwokerto. To the east is the old cemetery on Ragasemangsang Road.

=== Bank BRI Museum ===
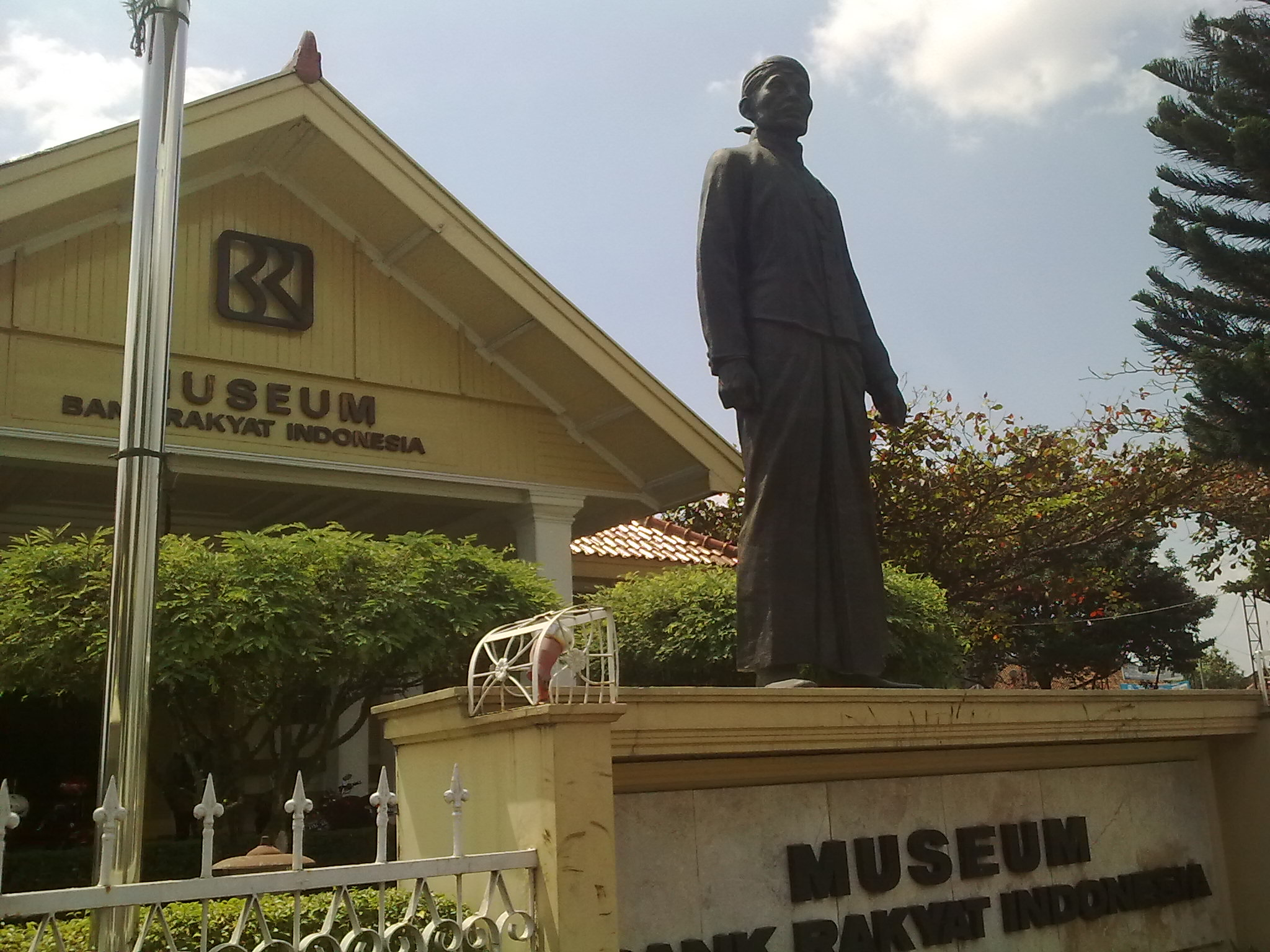
Bank BRI Museum

Located in the city center, Bank BRI Museum was built and dedicated to the Bank BRI's founder, R.A. Wiriatmadja. Formerly named as De Purwakertosche Hulp-en Spaar Bank der Inlandsche Bestuur Ambtenaren in 1895, now Bank BRI is one of the largest bank in the nation, as well as the oldest in the nation. Displays a lot of collections of coin and money from the VOC era until the present time.

=== Baturraden ===
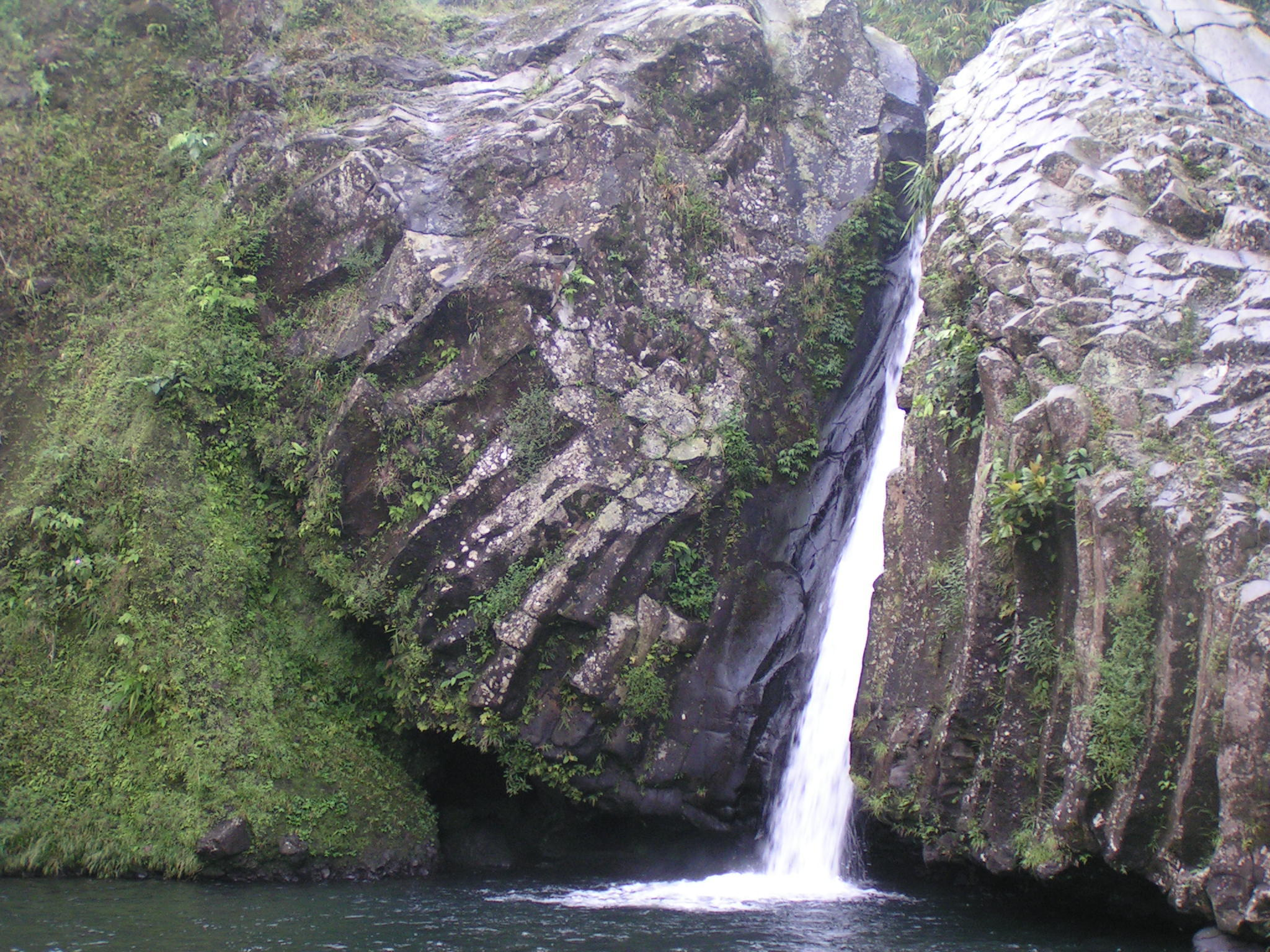
Waterfall at Baturraden

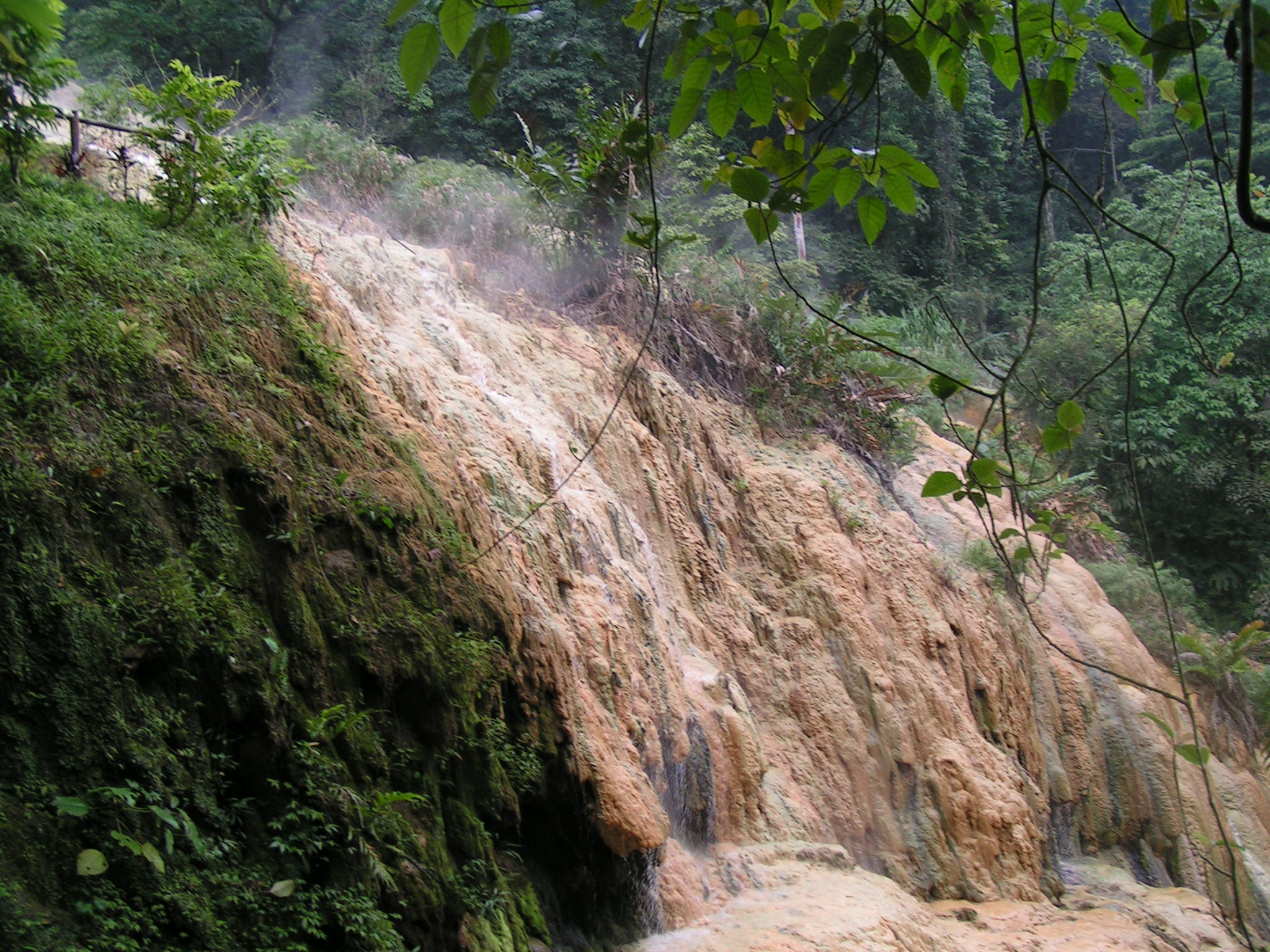
Hot Spring Mineral Deposits in Baturraden

Baturraden, located 15 km north of Purwokerto is an area of the typical highland country at the foot of the Gunung Slamet volcano. It is a popular site for local tourism, with a children's playground, hot springs, trekking and camping. There are two natural hot springs at Baturraden, namely Pancuran Telu and Pancuran Pitu. The campground is called Wana Wisata. Some hotels, villas and budget hotels are available in Baturraden.

=== Parks & public facilities ===
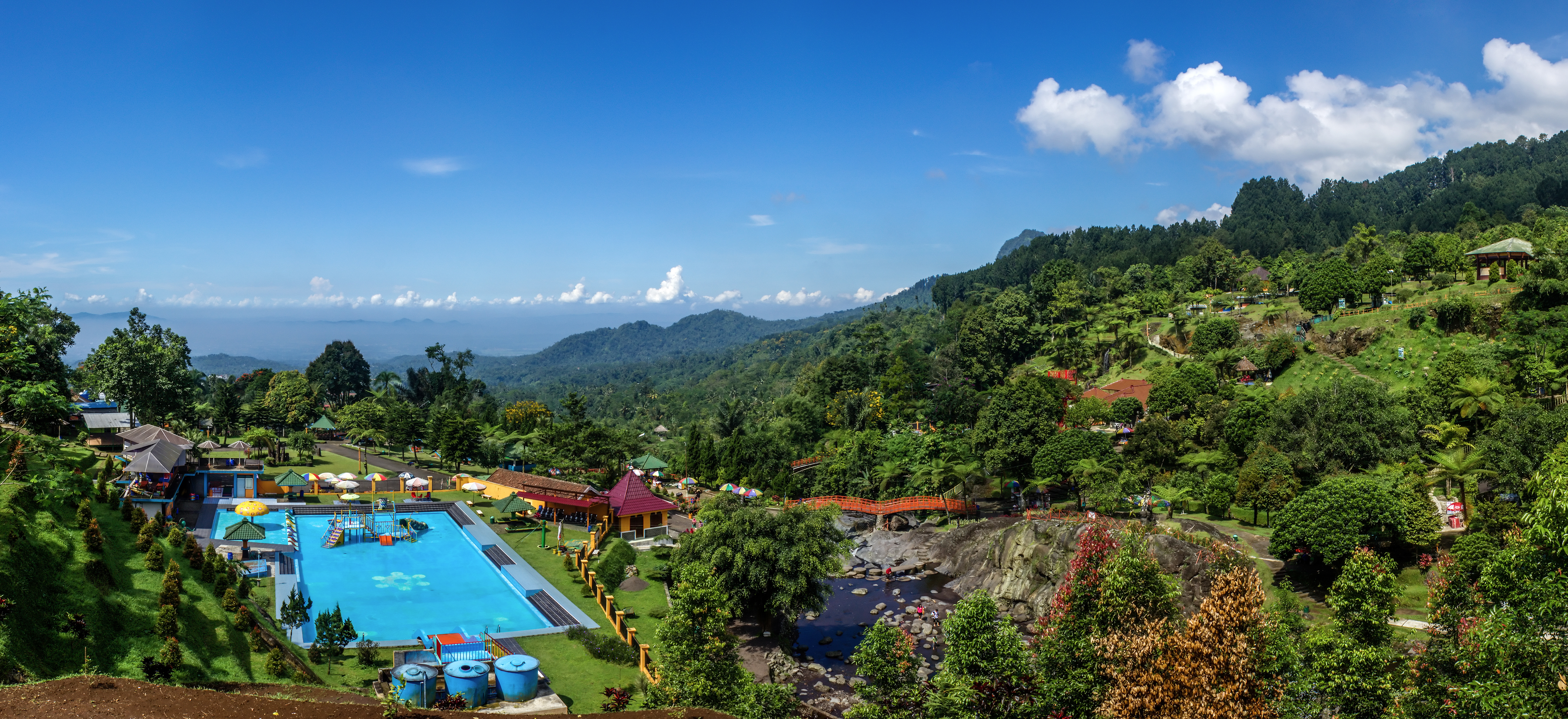
Panoramic overview of Baturraden

- Taman Andang Pangrenan, replacing ex-old bus station, now is become a green park in the town
- Taman Bale Kemambang, another green park located in Jl.Karangkobar

== Cuisine ==
The Purwokerto local food includes mendoan (fermented soy bean covered in wheat flour dough and deep fried), ranjem, nopia and mino (small nopia), tempeh keripik and many different kinds of chips. Gethuk goreng, made of cassava and Javanese sugar is also available. It is sold by various shops under various names. Also, in the morning, one may find a serabi seller on almost every corner of town. One Purwokerto delicacy is soto. It is also made in the nearby town of Sokaraja. Purwokerto soto is made from the chicken while that from Sokaraja contains beef. Both are different from other sotos in Indonesia, because they are mixed with a spicy nut sambal.

== Medical facilities ==
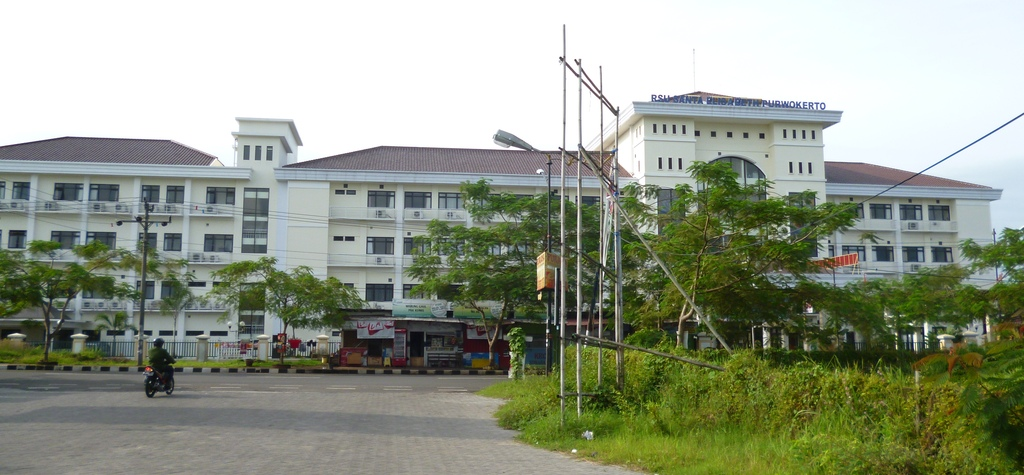
St. Elizabeth Hospital - Dr. Angka St

Purwokerto is a center for medical care for the southern part of the Central Java Province. There are both public and private hospitals for both general and specialist care. They include:

- RSUD Margono Soekarjo County Hospital (teaching hospital for Jenderal Soedirman University School of Medicine), includes also RS Geriatri Hospital as the specialty hospital (for gerontology) under the same management of RSUD Margono Soekarjo County Hospital
- RS Wijaya Kusuma (a.k.a. DKT) Hospital
- RS Santa Elisabeth hospital
- RS Islam Hospital
- RS Hidayah Hospital
- RS Bunda Hospital
- RS Ananda Hospital
- RS Orthopedic Hospital (orthopaedics).
- Jenderal Soedirman University Dental Hospital
- RS Hermina Hospital (U/C)

The main state-run hospital is RSUD Margono Soekarjo County Hospital which is located on the eastern edge of Purwokerto. Its name is commonly shortened to "RS Margono Soekarjo". It was named after the first surgeon in Indonesia. The surgeon was born in Purwokerto and his grave is found in Pesarean Kebutuh, Sokaraja Kulon.

Since 2010, Purwokerto has also been known as the place offering plastic surgery services. The plastic surgery services are provided by RSUD Margono Soekarjo County Hospital and RS Geriatri hospital.

== Education ==
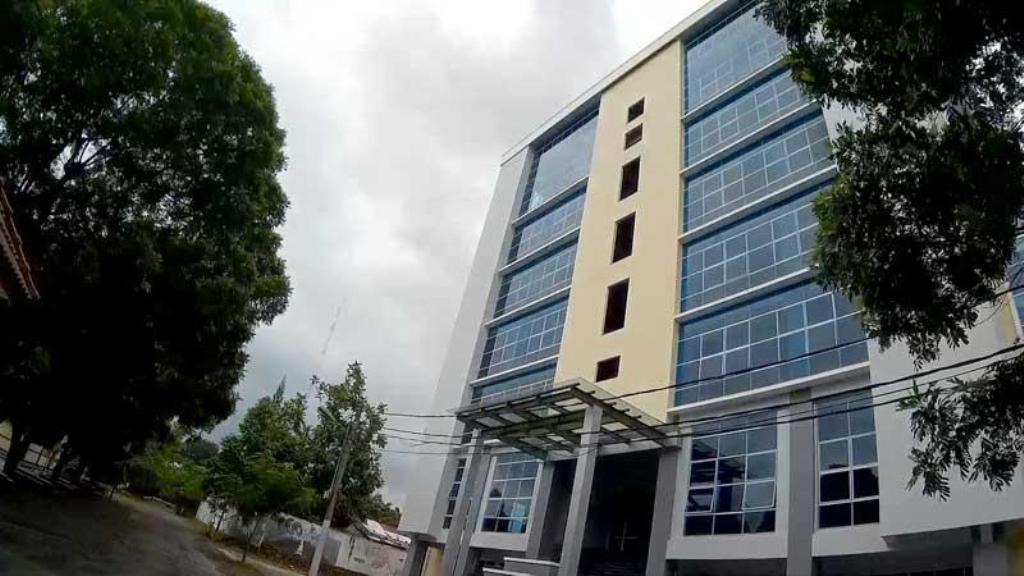
Unsoed - Purwokerto

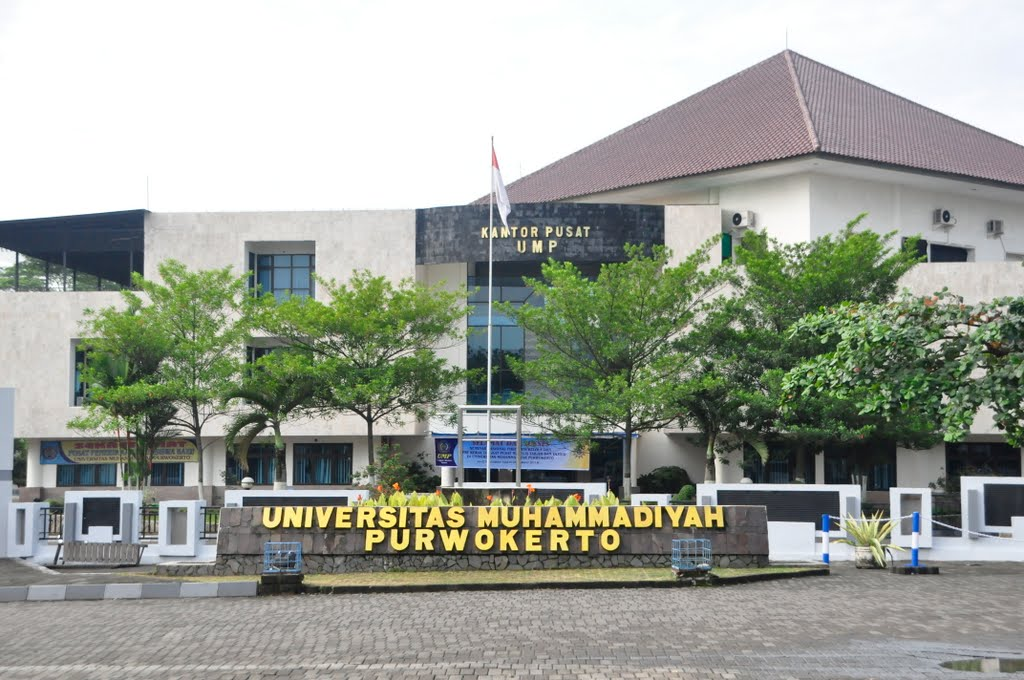
Universitas Muhamadiyah Purwokerto - UMP

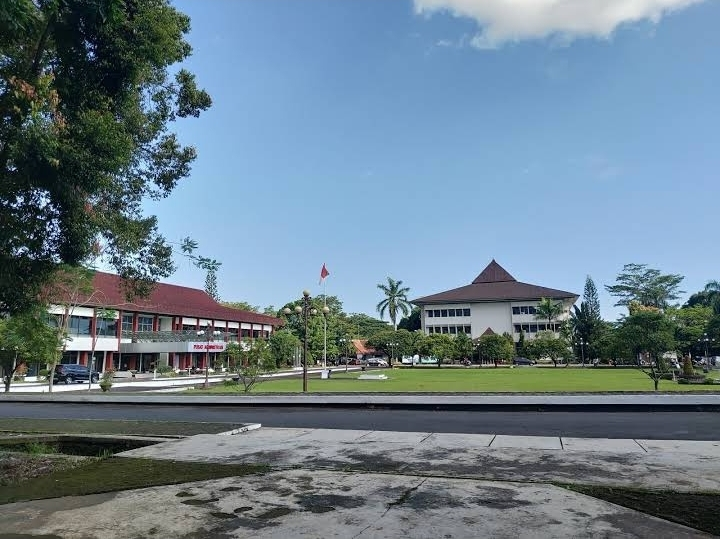
Jenderal Soedirman University, the oldest University in Purwokerto

Jenderal Soedirman University is the main university in Purwokerto. It is located on the town's northern outskirts and south of the town for Faculty of Medicine. There are many universities and academies in Purwokerto which serve the southern part of central Java. They include:

- Jenderal Soedirman University (UNSOED)
- Muhammadiyah Purwokerto University
- Amikom University of Purwokerto
- Wijaya kusuma University
- Telkom Institute of Technology Purwokerto
- Universitas Islam Negeri Saifuddin Zuhri Purwokerto (UINSAIZU)
- Sekolah Tinggi Ilmu Komputer (STIKOM) Yos Sudarso Purwokerto
- Sekolah Tinggi Ilmu Ekonomi Purwokerto
- Sekolah Tinggi Ilmu Ekonomi Satria
- Sekolah Tinggi Manajemen Informatika & Komputer Widya Utama
- Sekolah Tinggi Teknik Wiworotomo
- Akademi Kebidanan YLPP
- Akademi Kesehatan Lingkungan
- Informatics and Computer Management Academy
- Akademi Pariwisata “Eka Sakti”
- Nursing Muhammadiyah Academy
- Pratama Politechnic

== Notable people ==
- Tontowi Ahmad, badminton player
- Christian Hadinata, badminton player
- Fung Permadi, badminton player
- General Gatot Soebroto, an Army General and a National Hero during the Independence of Indonesia
- Saifuddin Zuhri, Minister of Religion in the era of Sukarno

== See also ==
- General Sudirman Airport
