= Banyumas Regency =

Regency in Central Java, Indonesia

Banyumas Regency Kabupaten Banyumas
- Regency

Other transcription(s)
  - Javanese: ꦧꦚꦸꦩꦱ꧀
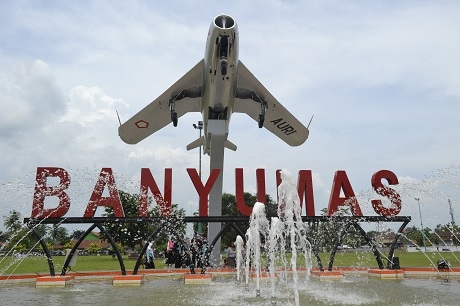
- Alun-alun Banyumas, featuring MiG-17 monument of the Indonesian Air Force

- Coat of arms
- Motto: Rarasing Rasa Wiwaraning Pradja 'Founded in 1966' (Note: Javanese solar chronogram (surya sengkala)) (lit. ''Harmonious soul of the people, gate of the city's hope.'')
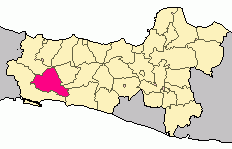
- Location within Central Java

- Location in Java and Indonesia Banyumas Regency (Indonesia)
- Coordinates: 7.425°S 109.230°E
- Country: Indonesia
- Province: Central Java
- Capital: Purwokerto

Government
  - Regent: Sadewo Tri Lastiono
  - Vice Regent: Dwi Asih Lintarti

Area
  - Total: 1,391.15 km^{2} (537.13 sq mi)
- Elevation: 75 m (246 ft)
- Highest elevation: 3,428 m (11,247 ft)
- Lowest elevation: 9 m (30 ft)

Population (mid 2025 estimate)
  - Total: 1,865,270
  - Density: 1,340.81/km^{2} (3,472.69/sq mi)
- Time zone: UTC+7 (IWST)
- Area code: (+62) 281
- Website: banyumaskab.go.id

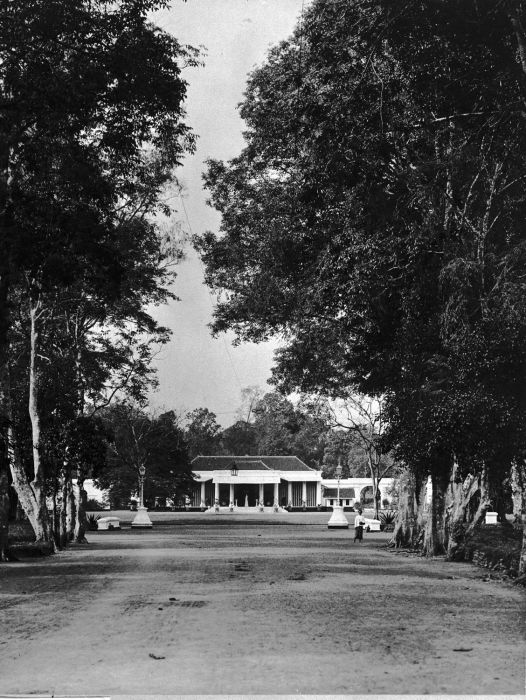
The house of the resident of Banyumas c. 1905

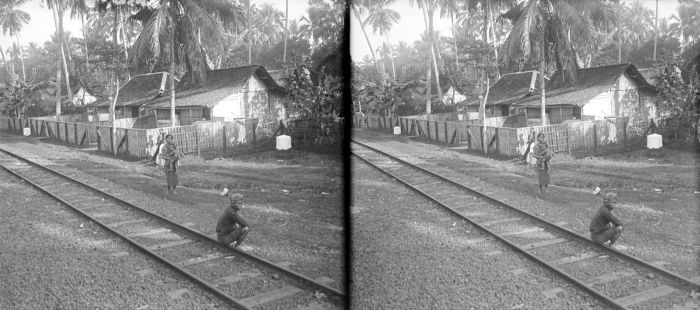
Train at Banjoemas (Banyumas)

Banyumas (Javanese: ꦧꦚꦸꦩꦱ꧀, formerly spelled Banjoemas) Regency is an inland regency (Indonesian: kabupaten) in the southwestern part of Central Java province in Indonesia. Its capital is the town of Purwokerto, but that town no longer has a central administration and is split over four of the districts within the Regency, with a combined area of 41.65 km^{2} and a population of 237,940 as of mid 2025. The Regency covers an area of 1,391.15 km^{2}, and had a population of 1,554,527 at the 2010 Census and 1,776,918 at the 2020 Census; the official estimate of the population as of mid 2025 was 1,865,270 (comprising 937,725 males and 927,545 females).

The term Banyumasan is also used as an adjective referring to the culture, language, and peoples of the wider Banyumas area, equivalent to the pre-independence Banyumas Residency. The language of Banyumasan is of Austronesian origin and is usually considered to be a dialect of Javanese.

== Administrative districts ==
Banyumas Regency comprises twenty-seven districts (kecamatan), tabulated below with their areas and their populations at the 2010 Census and the 2020 Census, together with the official estimates as of mid 2025. The table also gives the location of the district administrative centres, the number of administrative villages in each district (totaling 301 rural desa and 30 urban kelurahan), and its postcodes.

Administrative district map of Banyumas Regency

Kode Wilayah	Name of District (kecamatan)	Area in km^{2}	Pop'n 2010 Census	Pop'n 2020 Census	Pop'n mid 2025 estimate	Admin centre	No. of villages	Post code
33.02.01	Lumbir	109.36	43,330	49,870	51,967	Lumbir	10	53177
33.02.02	Wangon	60.90	73,048	83,695	87,024	Wangon	12	53176
33.02.03	Jatilawang	48.73	57,052	66,431	69,615	Tunjung	11	53174
33.02.04	Rawalo	51.48	45,268	52,847	55,450	Rawalo	9	53173
33.02.05	Kebasen	52.63	55,746	67,140	71,517	Gambarsari	12	53172
33.02.06	Kemranjen	62.90	62,385	72,383	75,722	Kecila	15	53194
33.02.07	Sumpiuh	61.96	49,790	57,717	60,353	Kebokura	14 ^{(a)}	53195
33.02.08	Tambak	52.80	41,913	50,158	53,263	Kamulyan	12	53196
33.02.09	Somagede	43.70	31,827	37,540	39,585	Somagede	9	53193
33.02.10	Kalibagor	40.26	45,956	56,800	61,265	Kalibagor	12	53191
33.02.11	Banyumas	41.75	45,617	52,878	55,292	Sudagaran	12	53192
33.02.12	Patikraja	45.95	50,357	60,637	64,584	Notog	13	53171
33.02.13	Purwojati	41.33	30,804	36,981	39,331	Purwojati	10	53175
33.02.14	Ajibarang	69.84	89,899	102,326	106,058	Ajibarang Kulon	15	53163
33.02.15	Gumelar	92.40	45,154	53,349	56,302	Gumelar	10	53165
33.02.16	Pekuncen	81.10	64,424	75,576	79,484	Banjaranyar	16	53164
33.02.17	Cilongok	136.10	108,852	124,684	129,626	Pernasidi	20	53162
33.02.18	Karanglewas	33.43	57,195	67,269	70,836	Karangkemiri	13	53161
33.02.23	Kedungbanteng	56.34	51,118	61,771	65,904	Kedungbanteng	14	53152
33.02.22	Baturraden	45.77	47,152	53,514	55,388	Rempoah	12	53151 ^{(b)}
33.02.21	Sumbang	57.06	74,638	93,160	100,962	Sumbang	19	53183
33.02.20	Kembaran	26.64	72,148	81,737	84,526	Kembaran	16	53182
33.02.19	Sokaraja	30.28	76,903	89,184	93,276	Sokaraja Kulon	18	53181
33.02.24	Purwokerto Selatan (South Purwokerto)	15.58	70,519	72,304	75,606	Karangklesem	7 ^{(c)}	53141: 53147
33.02.25	Purwokerto Barat (West Purwokerto)	7.99	49,083	52,802	54,590	Rejasari	7 ^{(d)}	53131: 53137
33.02.26	Purwokerto Timur (East Purwokerto)	8.39	57,112	54,585	56,434	Purwokerto Wetan	6 ^{(e)}	53111: 53116
33.02.27	Purwokerto Utara (North Purwokerto)	9.69	57,237	49,580	51,310	Bancarkembar	7 ^{(f)}	53121: 53127
	Totals	1,391.15	1,554,527	1,776,918	1,865,270	Purwokerto	331	

Notes: (a) including 3 kelurahan - Kebokura, Kradenan and Sumpiuh. (b) except the desa of Purwosari, which has a postcode of 53126.
(c) comprising 7 kelurahan - Berkoh, Karangklesem, Karangpucung, Purwokerto Kidul, Purwokerto Kulon, Tanjung and Teluk.
(d) comprising 7 kelurahan - Bantarsoka, Karanglewas Lor, Kedungwuluh, Kober, Pasir Kidul, Pasirmuncang and Rejasari.
(e) comprising 6 kelurahan - Arcawinangun, Kranji, Mersi, Purwokerto Lor, Purwokerto Wetan and Sokanegara.
(f) comprising 7 kelurahan - Bancarkembar, Bobosan, Grendeng, Karangwangkal, Pabuaran, Purwanegara and Sumampir.

== Tourism ==
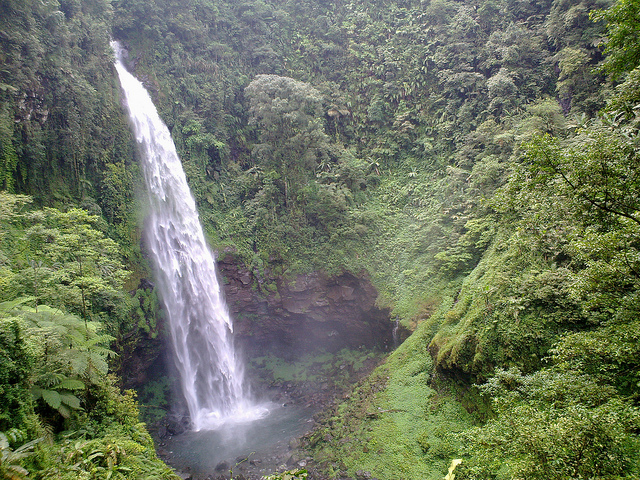
Curug Cipendok

Curug Cipendok is a waterfall 93 metres high, about 15 kilometres west of Purwokerto, 500 metres from the road through a walking trail. It is still natural and is easily accessible on a good road, although there is no public transportation yet. The area surrounding the location belongs to Perhutani, a Forest State Company. North of the capital of Purwokerto, Baturraden Resort features views from the slopes of Mount Slamet. And 8 km to Baturaden, there a Curug Ceheng, this is a waterfall 73 meters, there is an object to holiday.

Among the religious tourism sites in Banyumas is Saka Tunggal Mosque, established in 1871.
