= Mount Slamet =

Active stratovolcano in Central Java, Indonesia

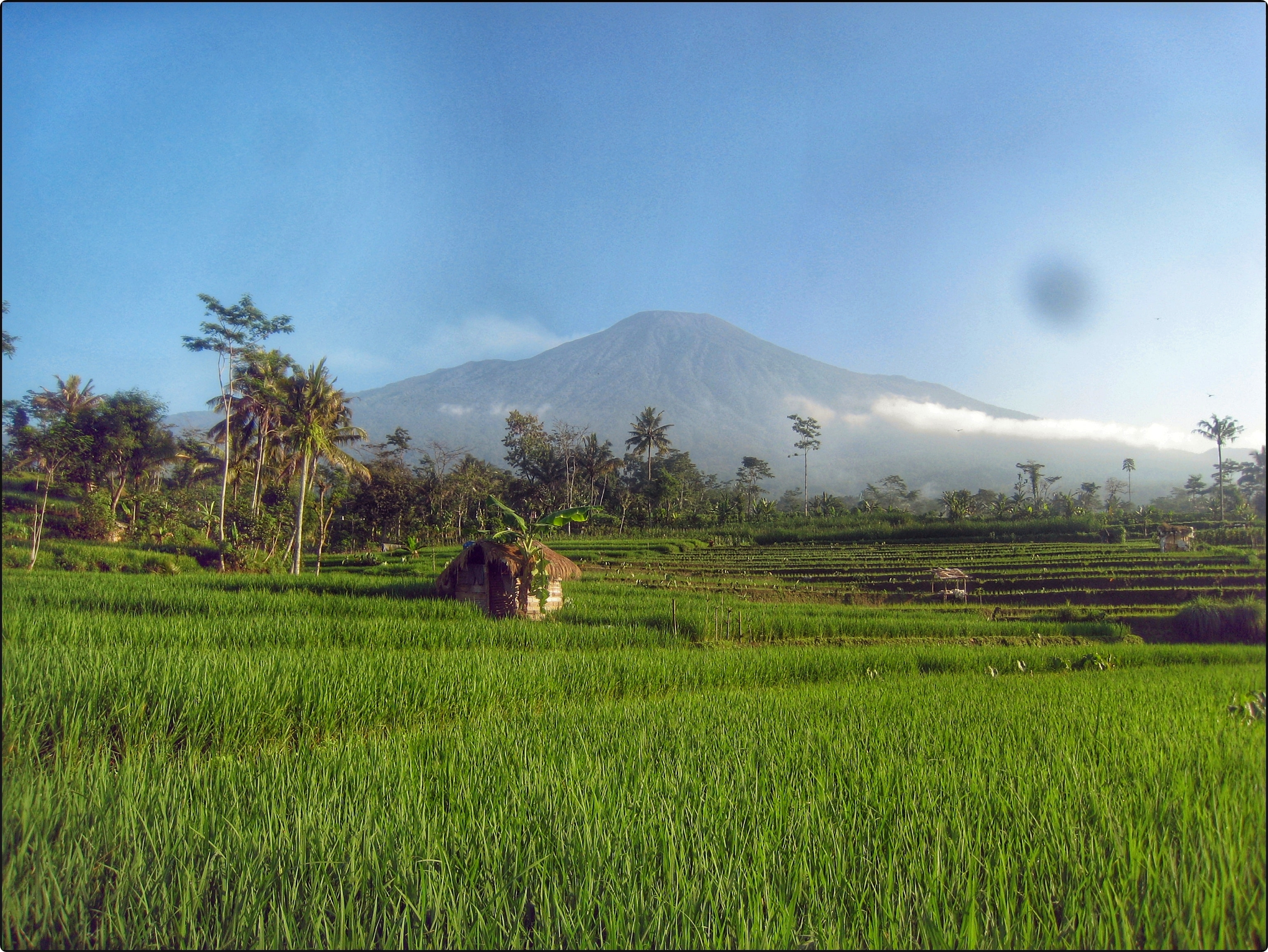
- Mount Slamet seen from Limpakuwus paddy field

Highest point
- Elevation: 3,432 m (11,260 ft)
- Prominence: 3,328 m (10,919 ft); Ranked 65th
- Listing: Ultra; Ribu
- Coordinates: 7°14′21″S 109°13′12″E

Geography
- Location within Java
- Location: Central Java, Indonesia
- Parent range: Sunda Arc

Geology
- Mountain type: Stratovolcano
- Volcanic arc: Sunda Arc
- Last eruption: March to September 2014

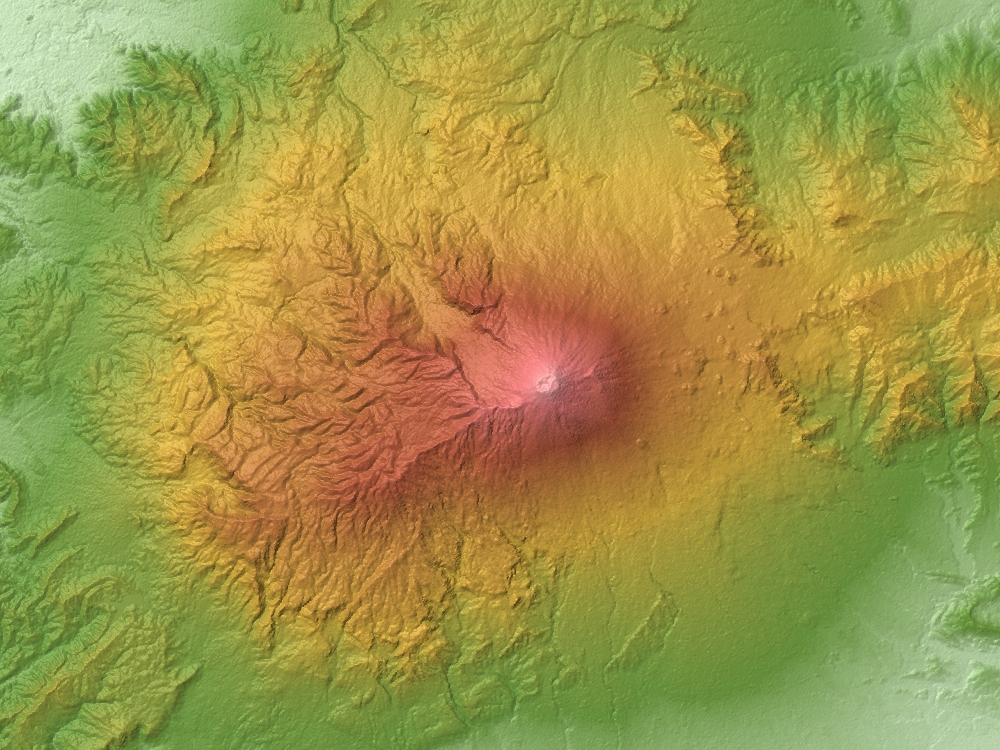
Relief Map

Mount Slamet eruption, August 26, 2014

Mount Slamet (Indonesian: Gunung Slamet, "Salvation Mountain" or "Mountain of Health") is an active stratovolcano that summits in the Pemalang Regency of Central Java, Indonesia. It has a cluster of around three dozen cinder cones on the lower southeast and northeast flanks and a single cinder cone on the western flank. The volcano is composed of two overlapping edifices. Four craters are found at the summit. Mount Slamet is a location with the coldest average temperature on the island of Java and one of the areas with the highest annual rainfall in Indonesia, namely 8,134.00 millimeters (mm) per year.

Historical eruptions have been recorded since the eighteenth century, with its most recent events being in 2009 and 2014. Its summit is Central Java's highest point, highest in Java after Semeru.

Several deaths have been recorded on the volcano in the 21st century, including that of a hiker who fell into the crater in August 2026 and another hiker who fell to his death earlier that same year.

== Eruptions ==
Mount Slamet has had a total of 42 confirmed eruptions as of 18 September 2014. The earliest recorded eruption was 11 August to 12 August 1772.

=== September 2014 ===
Mount Slamet erupted again Wednesday, September 18, 2014 after four years of remaining quiet. The volcano, dormant since 2009, began erupting again in late August 2014 prompting authorities to raise alert levels in the area. While the eruption was not considered to be a large one, a nearby forest was razed and authorities blocked off a 2.5-mile radius in case of increased activity. Residents otherwise remained calm.

== See also ==
- List of volcanoes in Indonesia
- Volcanological Survey of Indonesia
- List of ultras of the Malay Archipelago
