= List of populated places in Central Java =

This is a list of populated places in the Indonesian province of Central Java. The administrative capital of Central Java is Semarang. It is bordered by West Java in the west, the Indian Ocean and the Special Region of Yogyakarta in the south, East Java in the east, and the Java Sea in the north. It has a total area of 32,548 km², with a population of 34,552,500 million in mid 2019, making it the third-most populous province in both the island of Java and the country of Indonesia, after West Java and East Java. The province also includes the island of Nusakambangan in the south (close to the border of West Java), and the Karimun Jawa Islands in the Java Sea.

This list is organized by regency, with the seat of each regency bolded. Where a populated place is within an independent municipality, it is placed beneath it.

== Independent municipalities ==
- Pekalongan
- Salatiga
- Semarang
  - Sampangan
- Surakarta
  - Pasar Kliwon
- Tegal

== Banjarnegara Regency ==
Populated places in Banjarnegara Regency:

- **Banjarnegara**
- Banjengan
- Blimbing
- Bokol
- Candiwulan
- Glempang
- Jalatunda
- Kaliwungu
- Kebakalan
- Kebanaran
- Kertayasa
- Mandiraja
- Mandirajakulon
- Mandirajawetan
- Panggisari
- Purwasaba
- Salamerta
- Sijeruk
- Simbang
- Somawangi

== Banyumas Regency ==
Populated places in Banyumas Regency:

- **Purwokerto**

== Batang Regency ==
Populated places in Batang Regency:

- **Batang**
- Yosorejo

== Blora Regency ==
Populated places in Blora Regency:

- Ledok

== Boyolali Regency ==
Populated places in Boyolali Regency:

- Selo

== Brebes Regency ==
Populated places in Brebes Regency:

- Benda
- Jatibarang Lor
- Pasir Panjang

== Cilacap Regency ==
Populated places in Cilacap Regency:

- Datar

== Demak Regency ==
Populated places in Demak Regency:

- **Demak**

== Grobogan Regency ==
Populated places in Grobogan Regency:

- **Purwodadi**

== Jepara Regency ==
Populated places in Jepara Regency:

- Jepara
- Persian

== Karanganyar Regency ==
Populated places in Karanganyar Regency:

- **Karanganyar**

== Kebumen Regency ==
Populated places in Kebumen Regency:

- Gombong
- **Kebumen**

== Klaten Regency ==
Populated places in Klaten Regency:

- Bungasan
- Pokak
- Tonggalan

== Kudus Regency ==
Populated places in Kudus Regency:

- **Kudus, Indonesia**

== Magelang Regency ==
Populated places in Magelang Regency:

- Derpowangsan
- Magelang
- **Mungkid**
- Muntilan

== Pati Regency ==
Populated places in Pati Regency:

- Pati

== Pekalongan Regency ==
Populated places in Pekalongan Regency:

- Wonopringgo

== Pemalang Regency ==
Populated places in Pemalang Regency:

- Cangak

== Purbalingga Regency ==
Populated places in Purbalingga Regency:

- Bakulan

== Purworejo Regency ==
Populated places in Purworejo Regency:

- Kiyangkongrejo
- **Purworejo**

== Semarang Regency ==
Populated places in Semarang Regency:

- Ambarawa
- Tuntang
- **Ungaran**

== Tegal Regency ==
Populated places in Tegal Regency:

- Dukuhjati Wetan
- **Slawi**

== Wonosobo Regency ==
Populated places in Wonosobo Regency:

- Wadaslintang
- **Wonosobo**
