= Simbang =

Simbang may refer to:

- Nyctimystes obsoletus, known as the Simbang big-eyed tree frog, a species of frog in the subfamily Pelodryadinae
- Simbang Gabi, a devotional, nine-day series of Masses attended by Filipino Catholics in anticipation of Christmas
- Simbang, in Korean shamanism, a Jeju Island shaman

== Places ==
- Simbang, Maros, a district in South Sulawesi Province, Indonesia
- Simbang, Mandiraja, a village in Indonesia.
- Simbang, Morobe, a village in Papua New Guinea

== See also ==
- HMS Simbang, Sembawang Air Base#HMS Simbang (1945-1947)
