= Batur sheep =

Domesticated ruminant bred for meat and wool

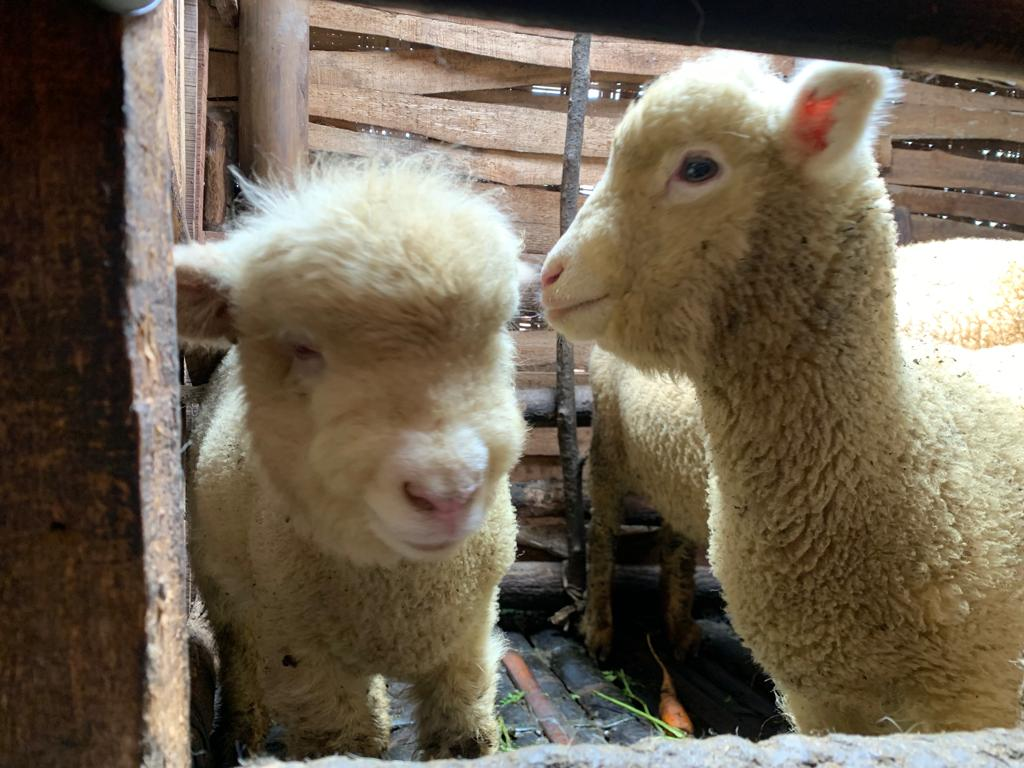

Batur Sheep is one of the genetic resources of local Indonesian livestock that has developed in Banjarnegara Regency since 1974. Based on the Decree of the Minister of Agriculture of the Republic of Indonesia dated June 17, 2011, Batur sheep has been designated as a local Indonesian livestock family with Banjarnegara Regency as the breeding area. Batur sheep is the result of a cross between merino and thin-tailed sheep with twice the weight of local sheep, namely 60–80 kg and a maximum weight of 140 kg. Batur sheep are meat and wool producing sheep. Batur sheep has a wool production capacity of 3 kg/head/shearing and can be sheared twice a year. Batur sheep have fine curly wool in a white spiral shape which covers its body except for the four parts of the legs and face, tall and long body with a long neck and medium tail. Batur sheep is one of the superior and dominant livestock breeds in the highlands. Batur sheep are livestock that are easy to develop because the maintenance system is not too complicated, has a fairly short reproductive cycle, and is quite disease resistant
