= Somawangi =

Coordinates: 7.4767°S 109.5165°E

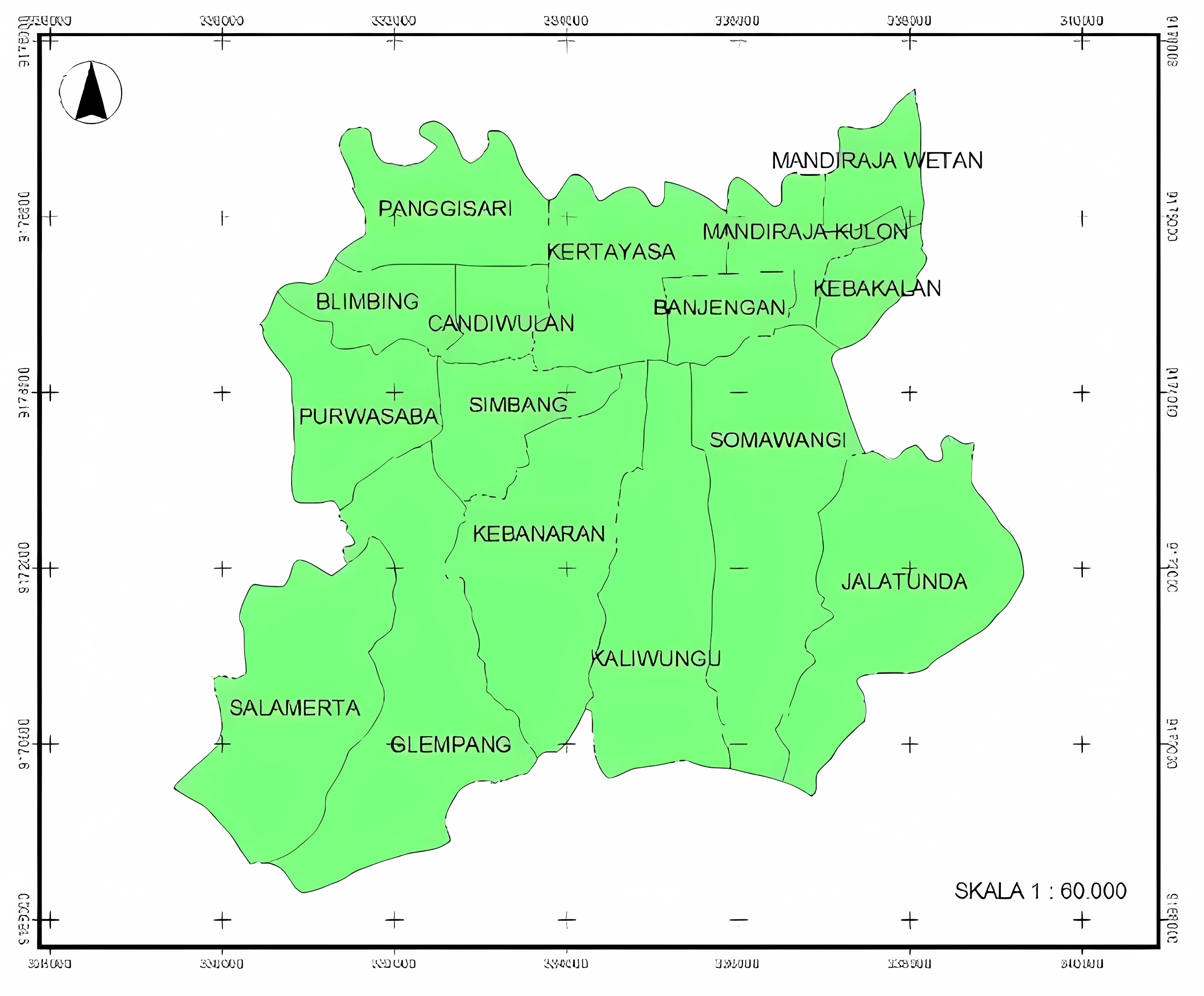
Map of villages in Mandiraja

Somawangi (Indonesian pronunciation: [somaˈwaŋi]) is a village in the town of Mandiraja, Banjarnegara Regency, Central Java Province, Indonesia. This village had an area of 690 ha (1,700 acres) and a population of 7,355 inhabitants in 2010.
