= Kaliwungu, Banjarnegara =

Village in Banjarnegara Regency, Central Java, Indonesia

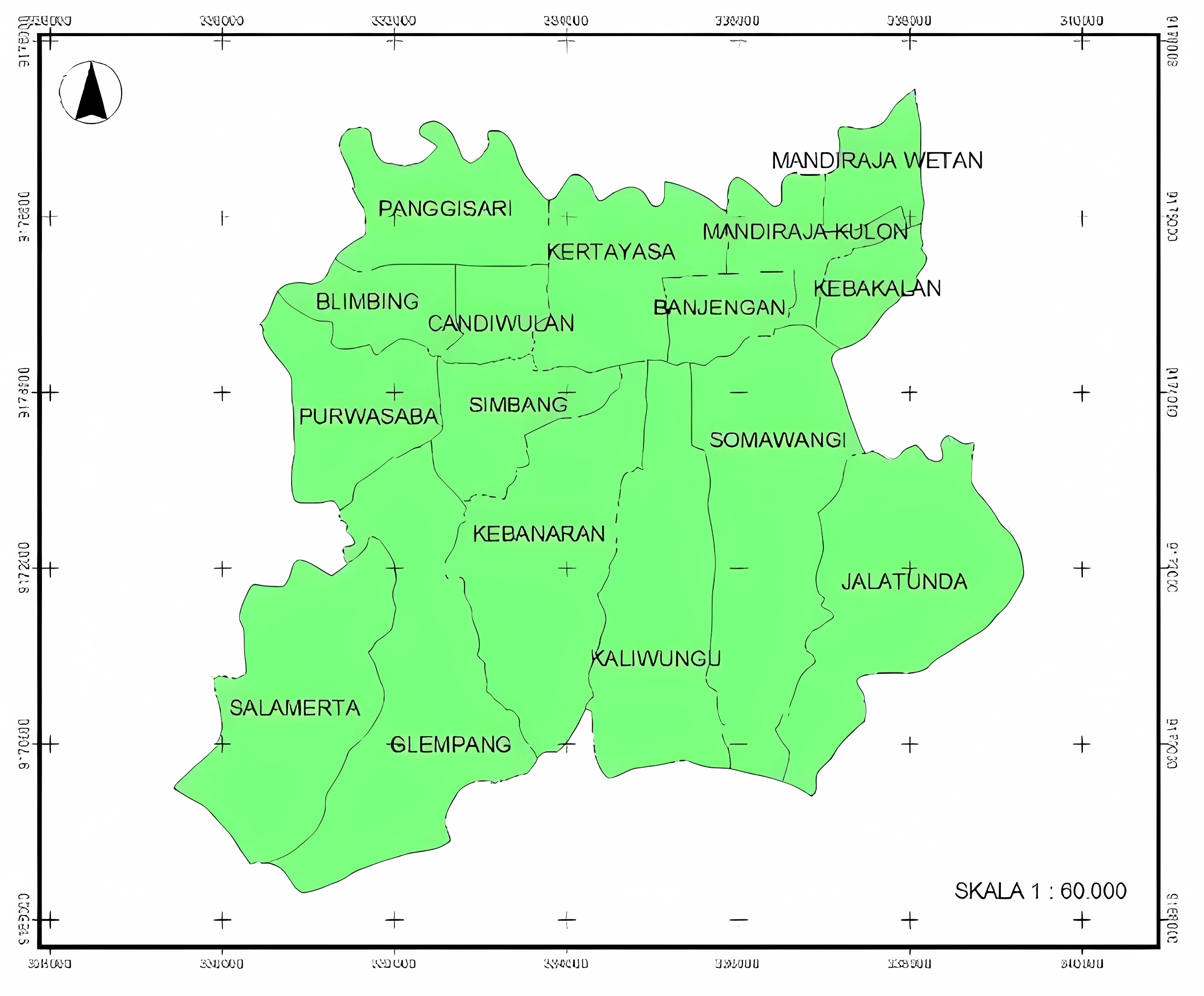
Map of villages in Mandiraja

Kaliwungu (Indonesian pronunciation: [kaliˈwuŋu]) is a village in the town of Mandiraja, Banjarnegara Regency, Central Java, Indonesia. It has an area of 529.73 hectares and a population of 3,479 inhabitants in 2010.
