= Kebakalan =

Village in Central Java, Indonesia

- Interactive map of Kebakalan
- Country: Indonesia
- Province: Central Java
- Regency: Banjarnegara
- District: Mandiraja

Area
  - Total: 1.013 km^{2} (0.391 sq mi)

Population
  - Total: 1,391
  - Density: 1,373/km^{2} (3,556/sq mi)
- Postal code: 53473

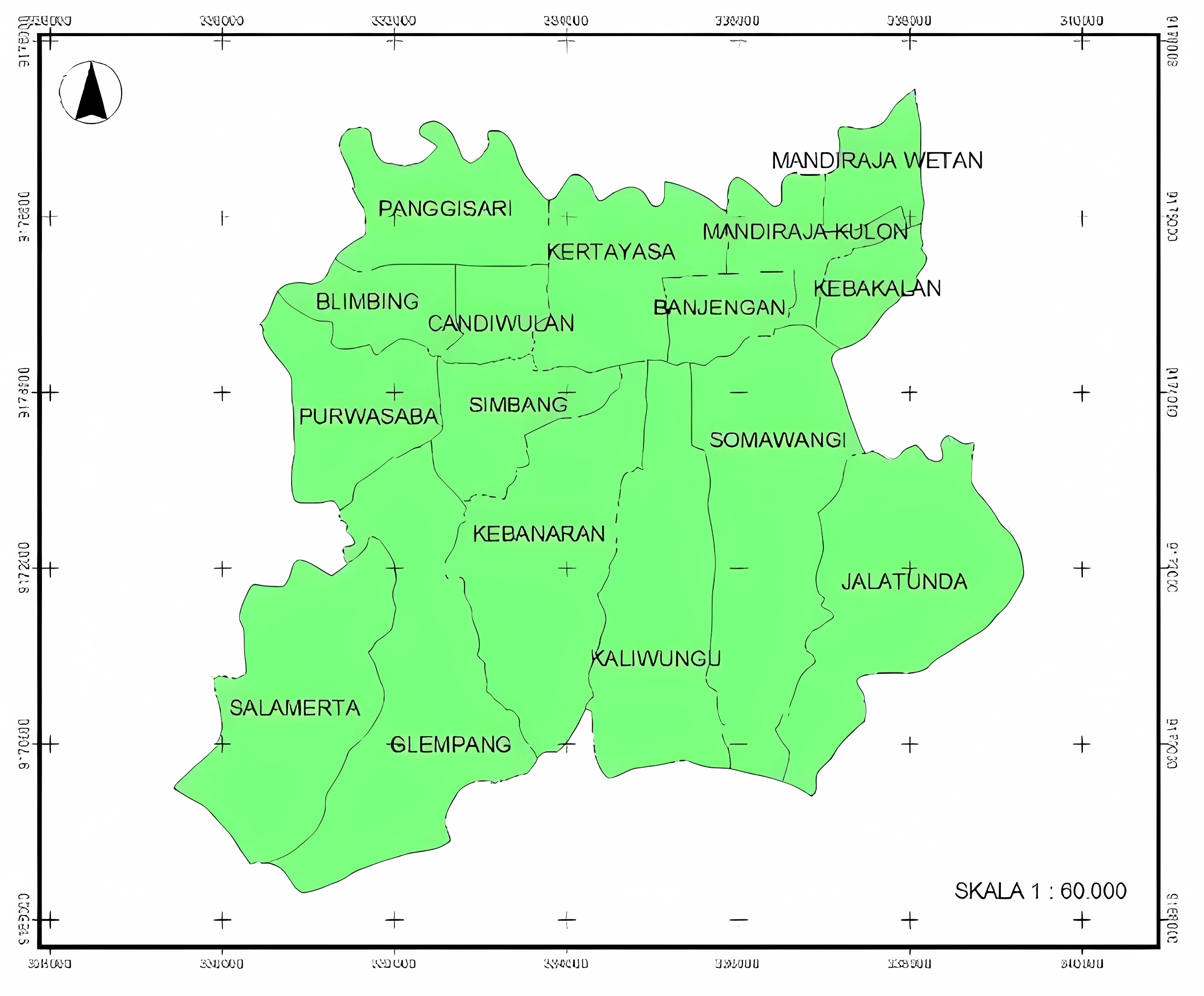
Map of villages in Mandiraja

Kebakalan (Indonesian pronunciation: [kəbaˈkalan]) is a village in the town of Mandiraja, Banjarnegara Regency, Central Java, Indonesia. The village has an area of 1.031 km^{2}. In 2010 census, had a population of 1,391.
