= Mandirajakulon =

Coordinates: 7.4529°S 109.5213°E

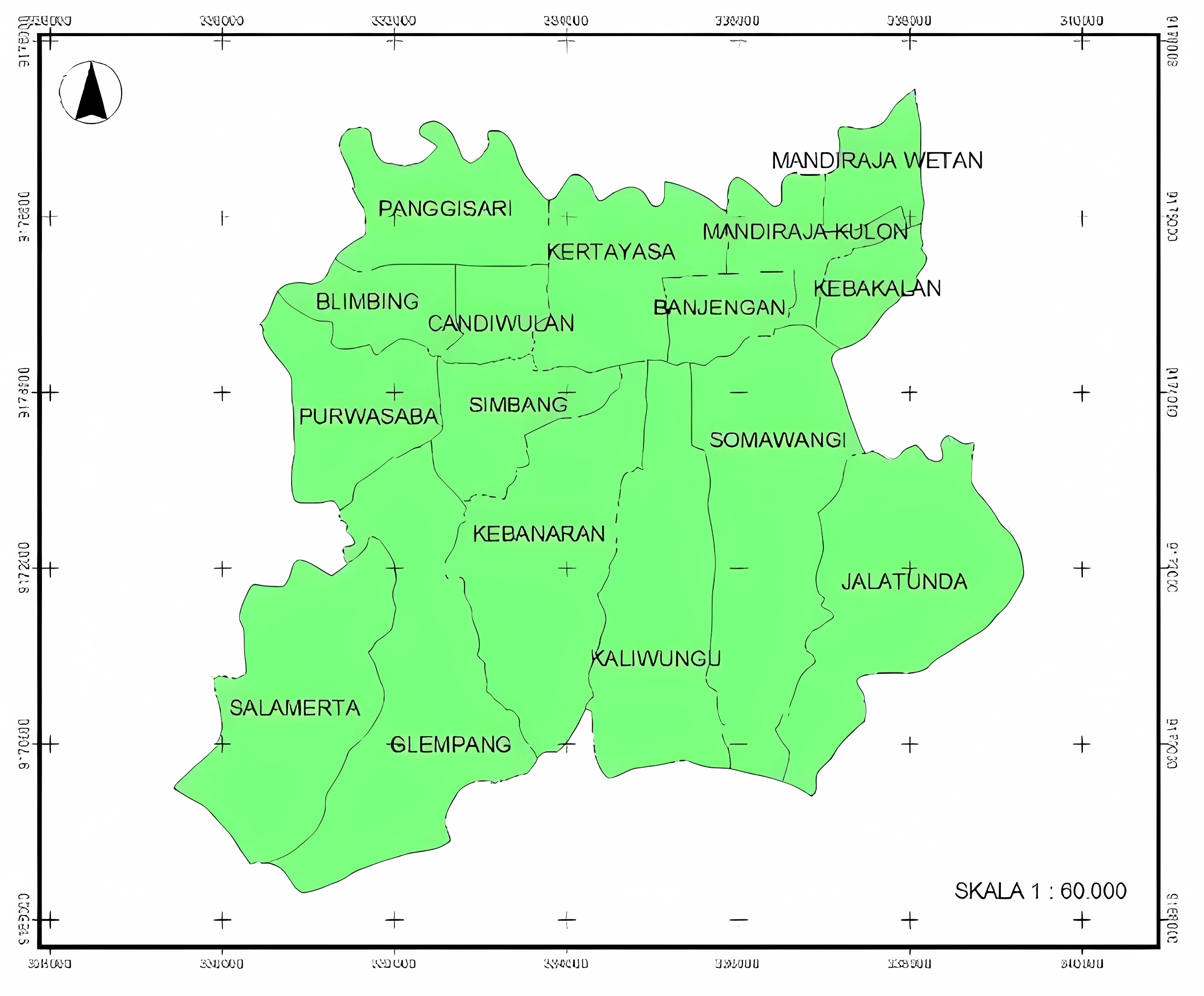
Map of villages in Mandiraja

Mandirajakulon is a village in the town Mandiraja, Banjarnegara Regency, Central Java Province, Indonesia. This village has an area of 5.652 hectares and a population of 17,797 inhabitants in 2010.
