= Mandiraja Terminal =

Mandiraja Terminal is a bus terminal in Banjarnegara Regency, Indonesia. This terminal serves short-distance, intermediate (intercity within the province), and long-distance (intercity between provinces) bus services.
