= Blimbing, Mandiraja =

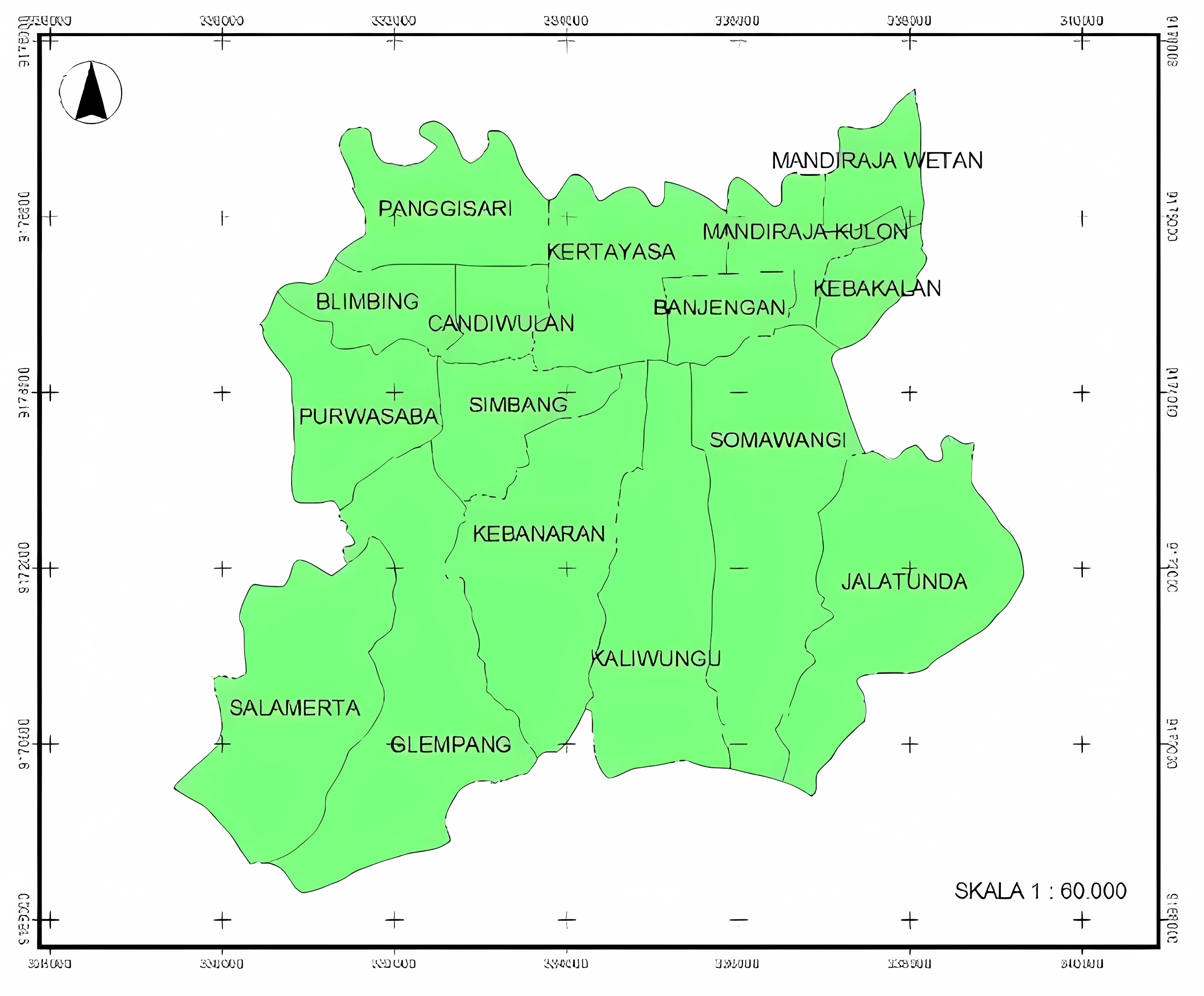
Map of villages in Mandiraja

Blimbing (Indonesian pronunciation: [ˈblimbɪŋ]) is a village in the town of Mandiraja, Banjarnegara Regency, Central Java Province, Indonesia. This village has an area of 97,56 hectares and a population of 2.005 inhabitants in 2010.
