= Mandirajawetan =

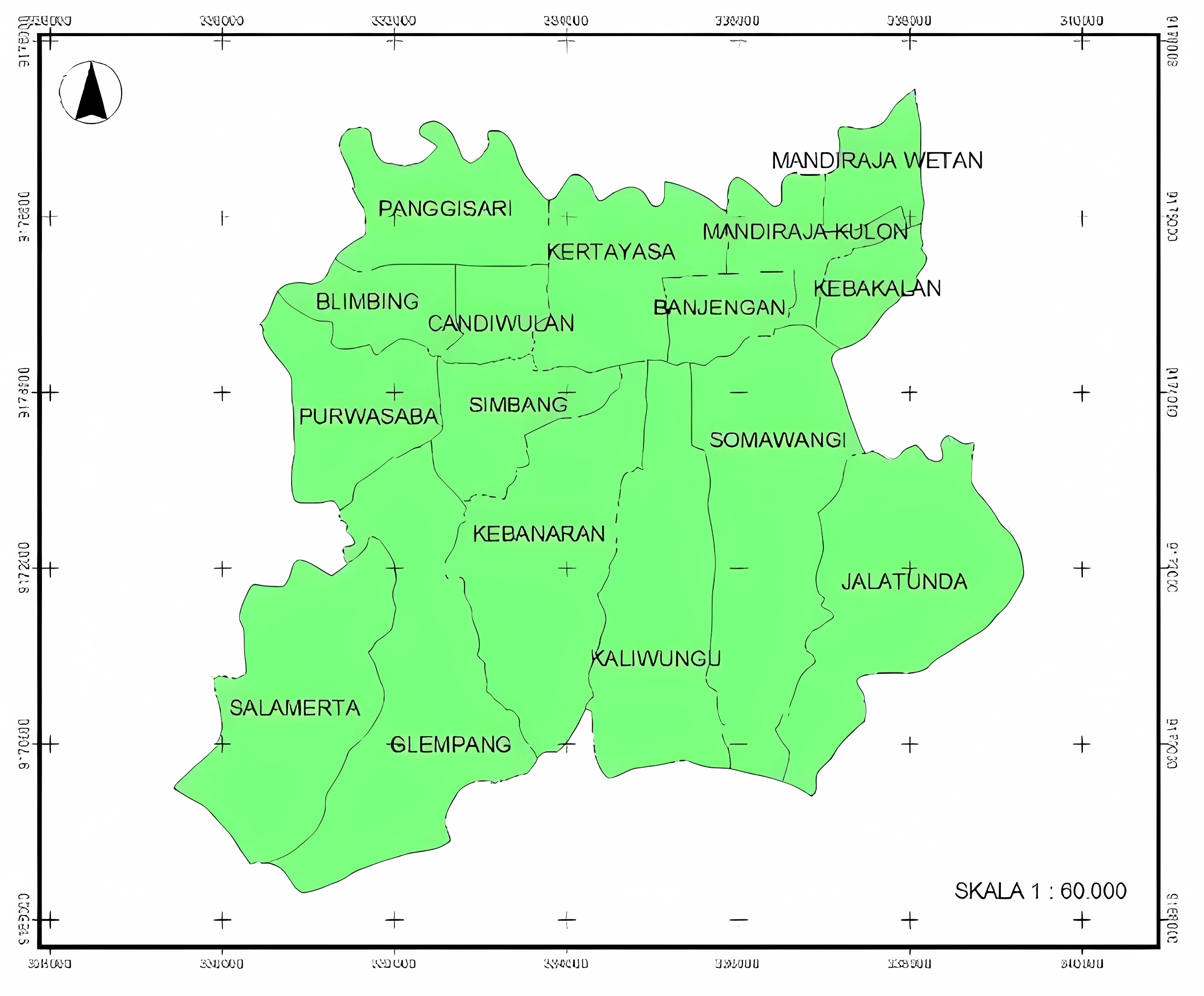
Map of villages in Mandiraja

Mandirajawetan is a village in the town of Mandiraja, Banjarnegara Regency, Central Java Province, Indonesia. This village has an area of 150.85 hectares and a population of 4,474 inhabitants in 2010.
