= Kebanaran =

Village in Banjarnegara Regency, Central Java, Indonesia

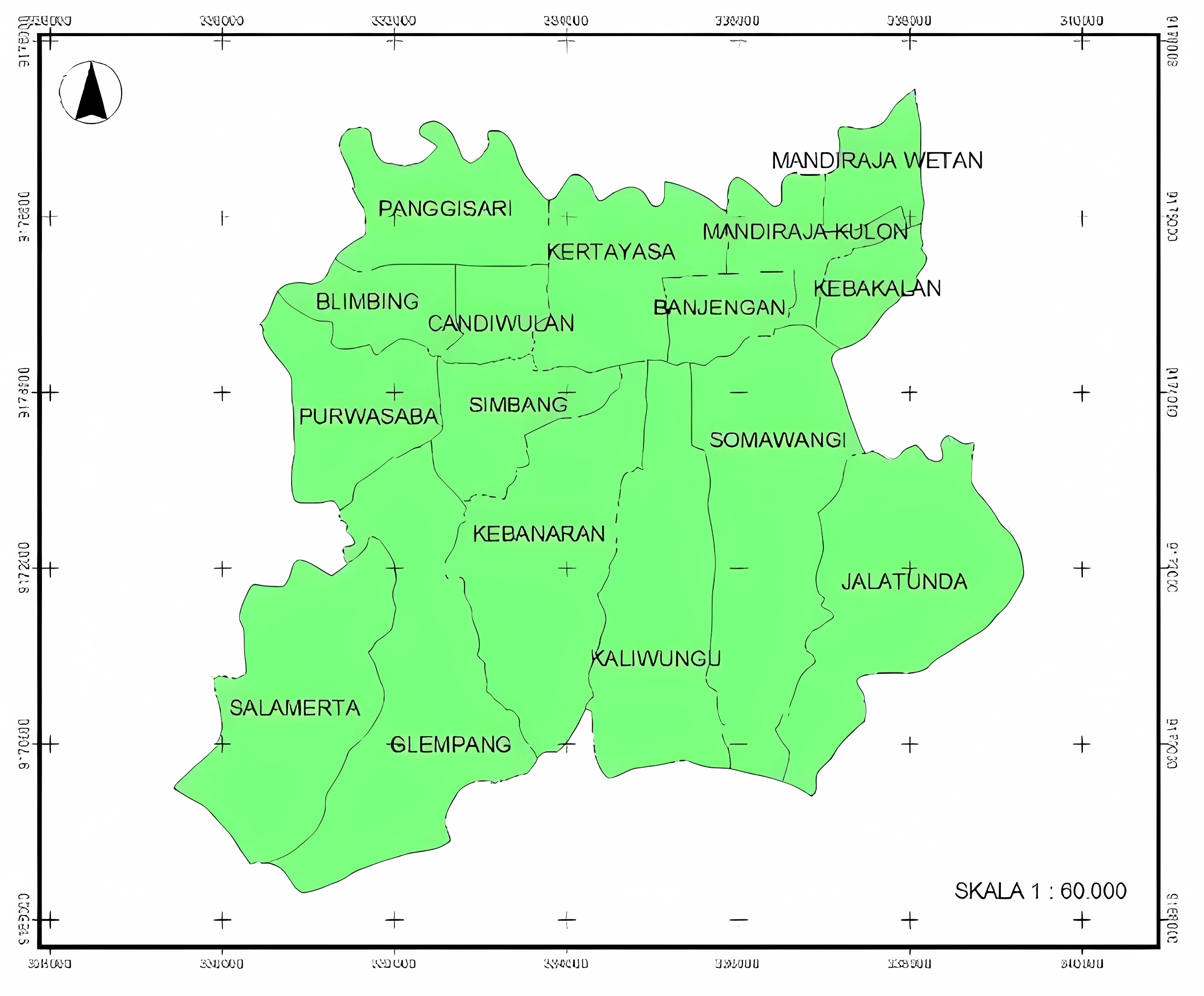
Map of villages in Mandiraja

Kebanaran (Indonesian pronunciation: [kəbaˈnaran]) is a village in the town of Mandiraja, Banjarnegara Regency, Central Java Province, Indonesia. This village has an area of 521,69 hectares and a population of 4.549 inhabitants in 2010.
