= 2025 Central Java landslides =

2025 landslides in Java, Indonesia

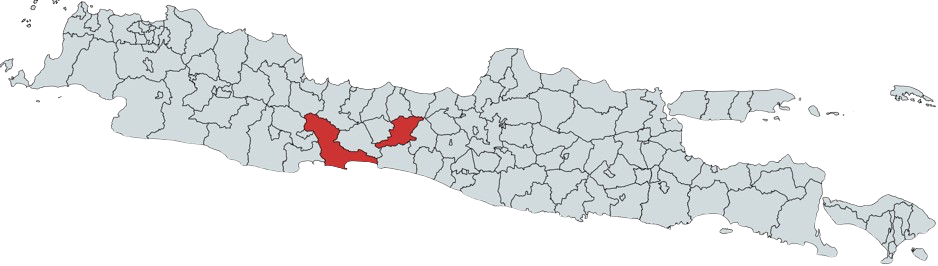
- Banjarnegara and Cilacap regencies in Java, Indonesia
- Date: November 13–15, 2025
- Cause: Heavy rainfall
- Deaths: 31+
- Missing: 20+
- Property damage: 296 houses destroyed or relocated

On November 13–15, multiple landslides hit villages in Central Java, Indonesia, killing at least 31 people total. The two hardest hit communities were the villages of Cibeunying and Pandanarum.

== Landslides ==
=== Cibeunying landslide ===
On November 13, heavy rainfall caused a landslide to hit the Cilacap regency, killing at least 21 people, and 2 people still missing.

=== Banjarnegara landslide ===
On November 15, heavy rainfall caused a landslide to hit Pandanarum in the Banjarnegara regency, killing at least 10 people, and at least 18 people still missing. Victims were buried in mud 3m to 8m (10ft to 25ft) deep. 823 residents were affected and relocated to three evacuation centers: Pandanarum Sub-district Office, Pringamba Village Sports Center, and Baji Village Sports Center.

== Response ==
More than 700 personnel from the military, police, search-and-rescue units, and volunteer groups have been deployed. 17 pieces of heavy excavation equipment were also deployed to clear soil that buried numerous houses in the areas.
