= Panggisari =

Village in Indonesia

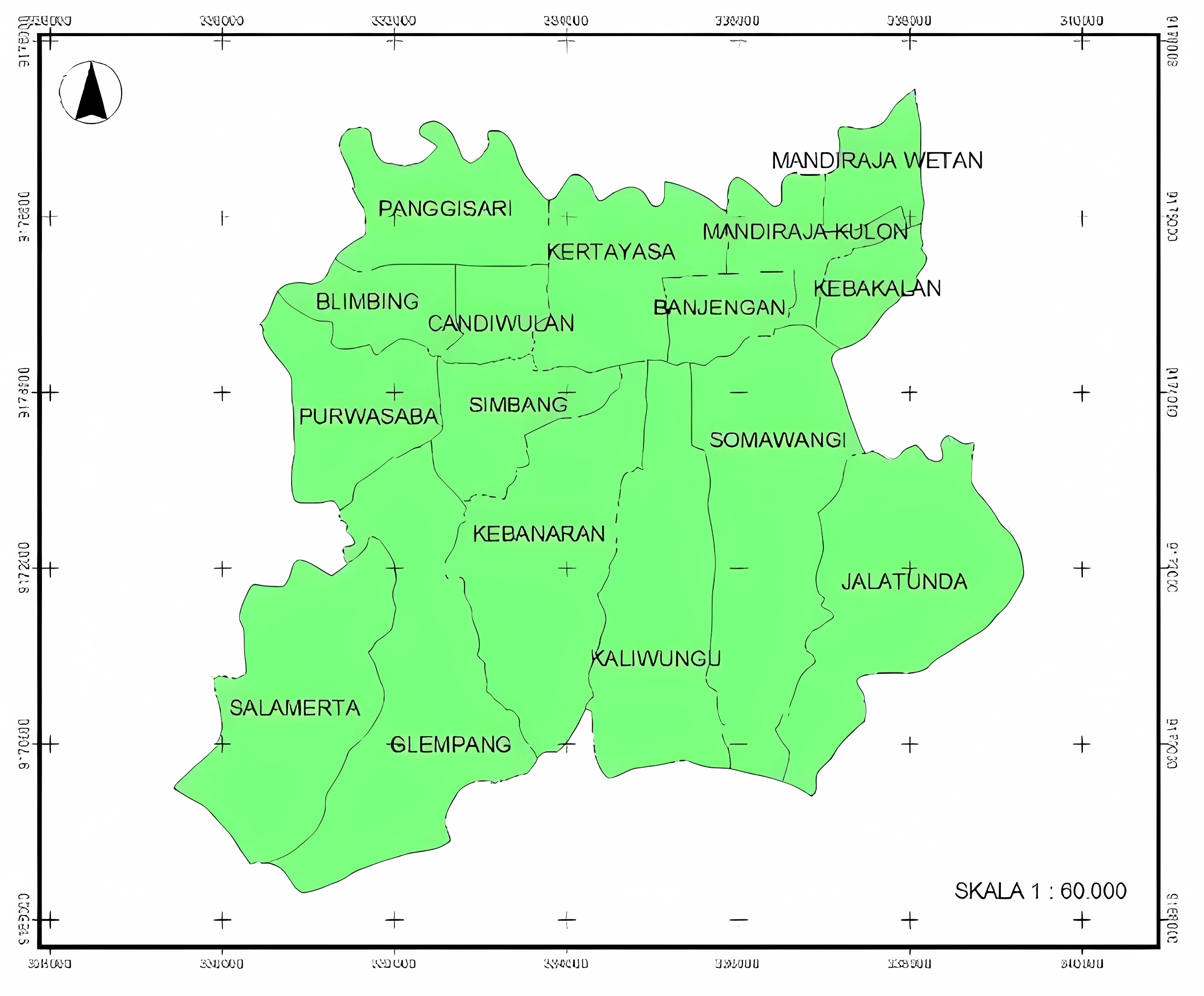
Map of villages in Mandiraja

Panggisari (Indonesian pronunciation: [paŋɡiˈsari]) is a village in Mandiraja Town, Banjarnegara Regency, Central Java Province, Indonesia. It had an area of 259.74 hectares and a population of 4,251 inhabitants in 2010.
