= Banjengan =

Village in Mandiraja, Central Java, Indonesia

Coordinates: 7.4616°S 109.5116°E

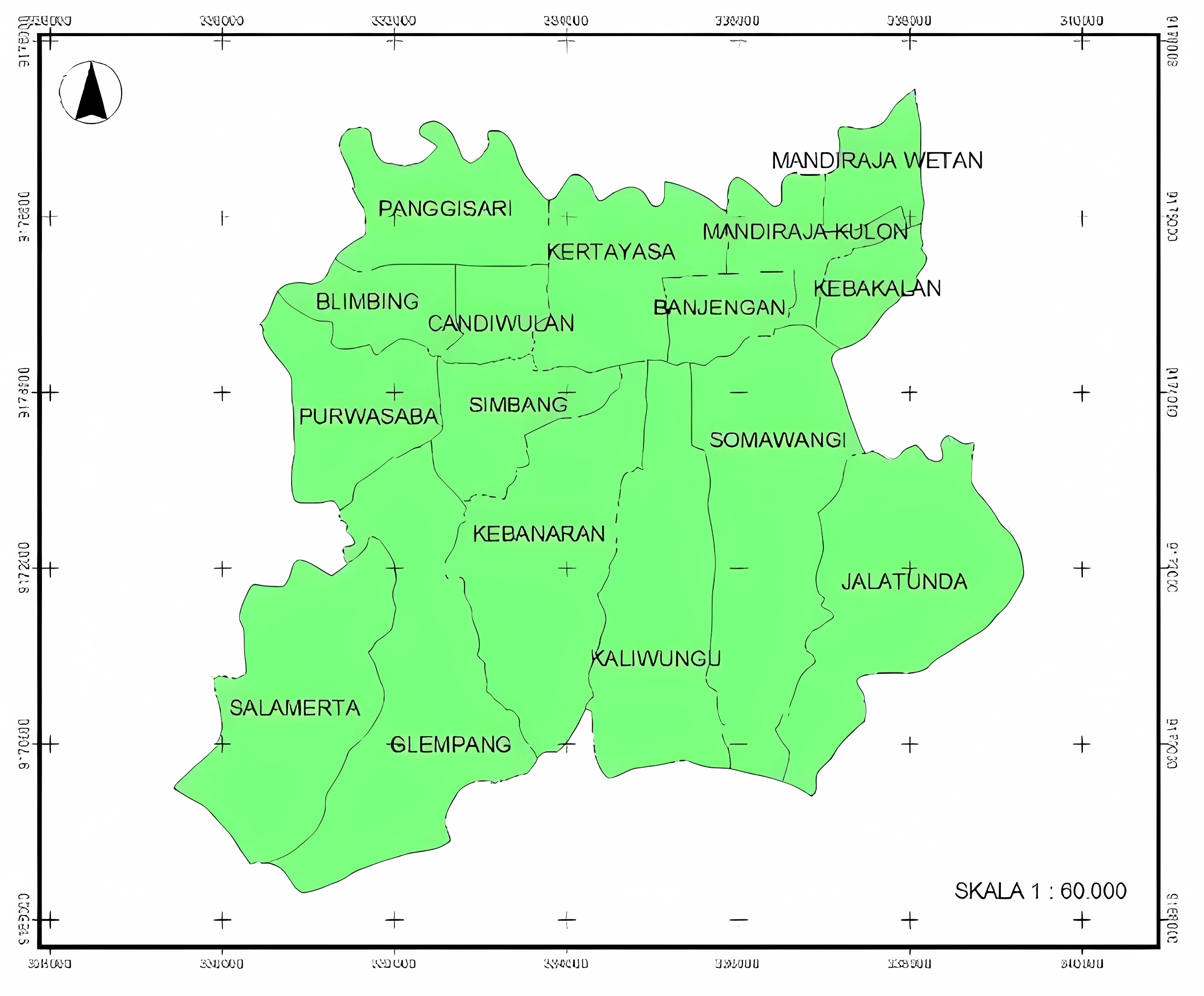
Map of villages in Mandiraja

Banjengan (Indonesian pronunciation: [baɲd͡ʒəŋan]) is a village in the town of Mandiraja, Banjarnegara Regency, Central Java Province, Indonesia. This villages has an area of 124.68 hectares and a population of 2,120 inhabitants in 2010.
