= Kertayasa, Mandiraja, Banjarnegara =

Village in Banjarnegara Regency, Central Java, Indonesia

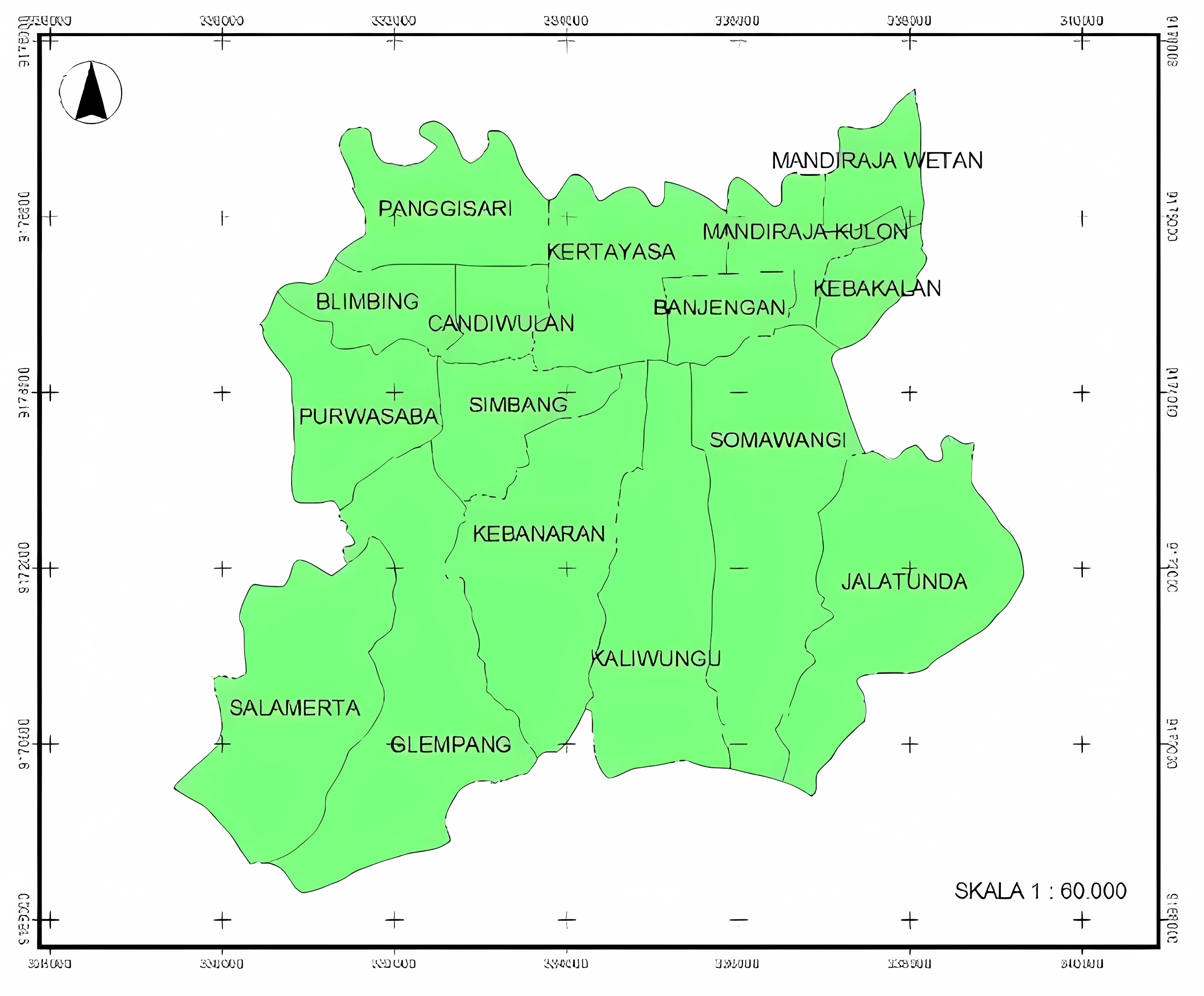
Map of villages in Mandiraja

Kertayasa is a village in the town of Mandiraja, Banjarnegara Regency, Central Java, Indonesia. It had an area of 343.43 hectares and a population of 5,519 inhabitants in 2010.
