= Candiwulan =

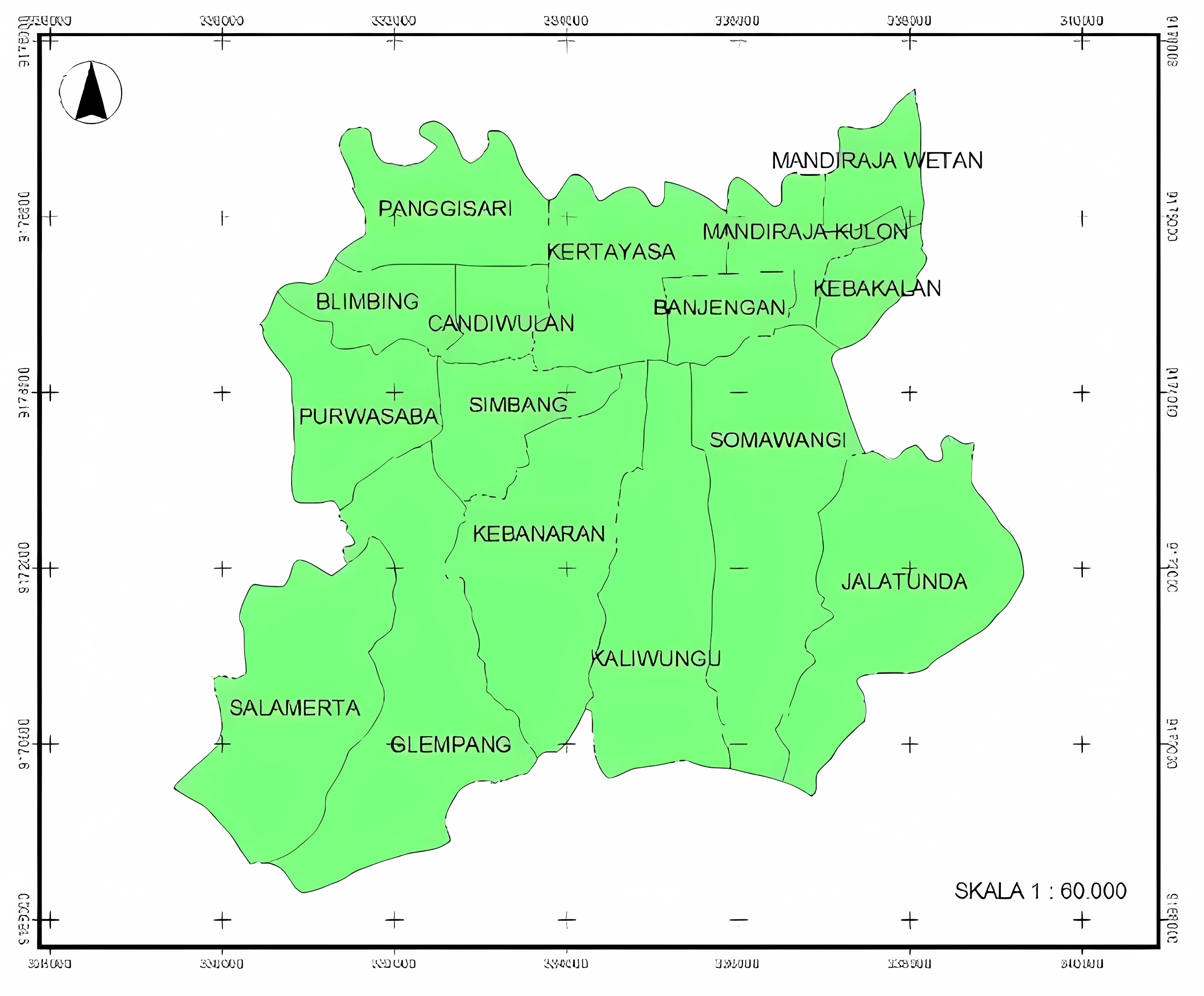
Map of villages in Mandiraja

Candiwulan (Indonesian pronunciation: [t͡ʃandiˈwulan]) is a village in the town of Mandiraja, Banjarnegara Regency, Central Java Province, Indonesia. This village has an area of 111.59 hectares and a population of 2,099 inhabitants in 2010.
