= Purwasaba =

Coordinates: 7°20′S 109°36′E

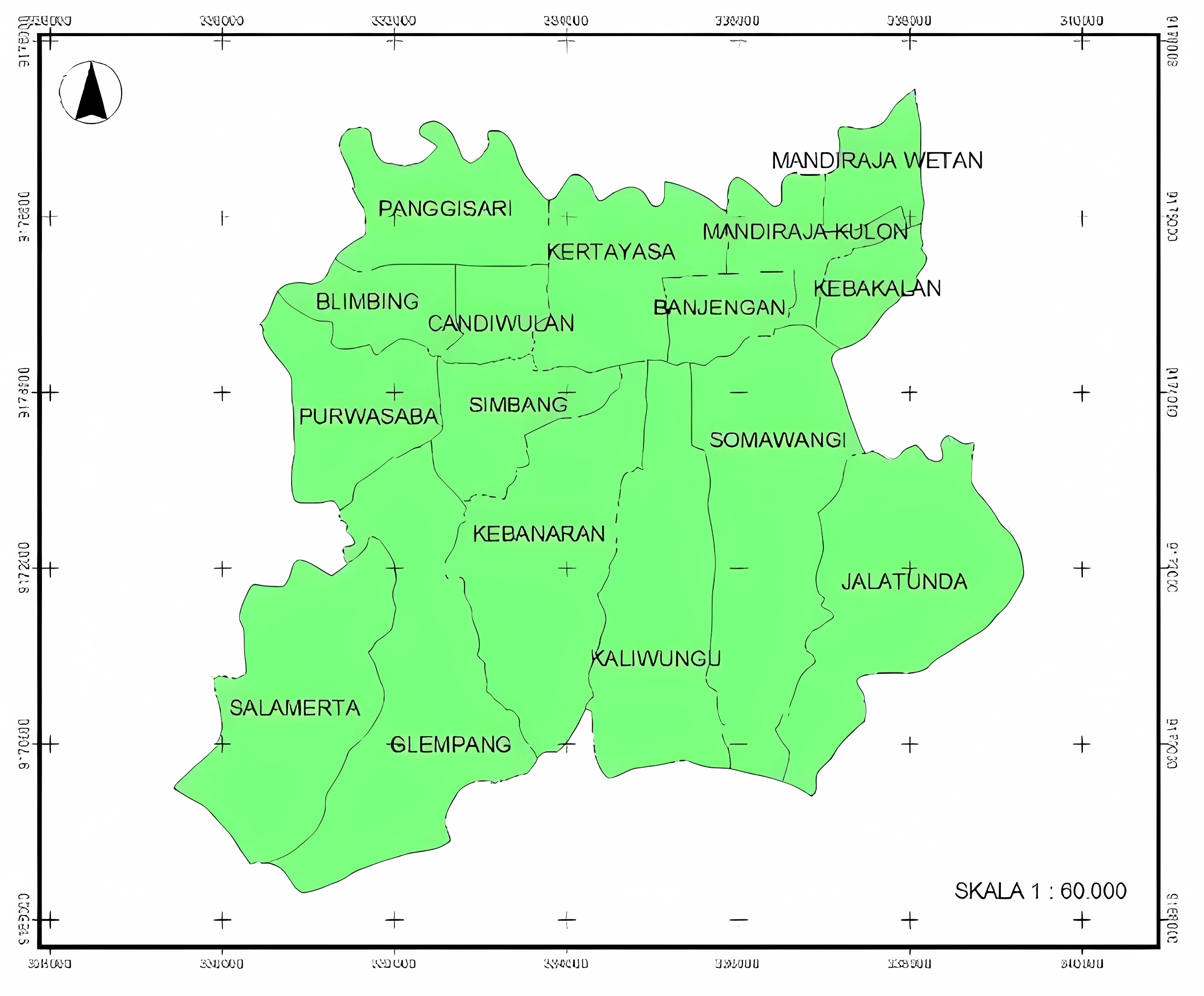
Map of villages in Mandiraja

Purwasaba is a village in Mandiraja Town, Banjarnegara Regency, Central Java Province, Indonesia. This village has an area of 282,16 hectares and a population of 5.665 inhabitants in 2010.
