= Jalatunda =

- Location in Java and Indonesia Jalatunda (Indonesia)
- Coordinates: 7°29′14″S 109°31′39″E
- Country: Indonesia
- Province: Central Java
- District: Mandiraja

Area
  - Total: 684.66 ha (1,691.8 acres)

Population (Census 2020)
  - Total: 4,365
  - Density: 637.5/km^{2} (1,651/sq mi)
- Time zone: UTC+7 (Indonesia Western Time)
- Area code: 0286
- Licence plate: R

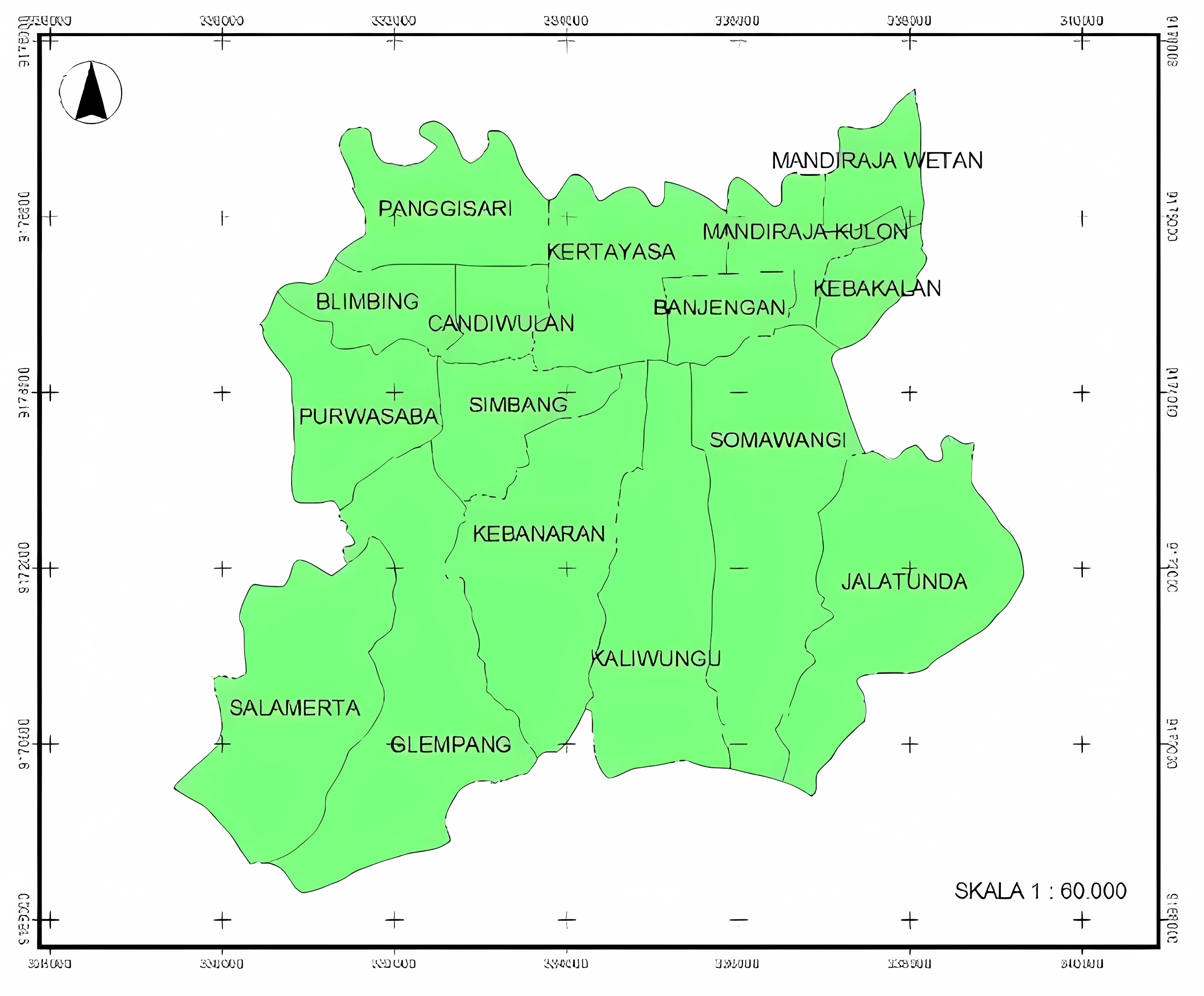
Map of villages in Mandiraja

Jalatunda (Indonesian pronunciation: [d͡ʒalaˈt̪unda]) is a village in the town of Mandiraja, Banjarnegara Regency, Central Java Province, Indonesia. This village has an area of 684.66 hectares and a population of 4,365 inhabitants in 2010.
