= Salamerta =

Village in Mandiraja, Bangarnegara, Indonesia

- village
- Interactive map of Salamerta
- Coordinates: 7.50194°S 109.46806°E
- Country: Indonesia
- Province: Central Java
- Elevation: 112 m (367 ft)
- Time zone: UTC+7 (WIB)

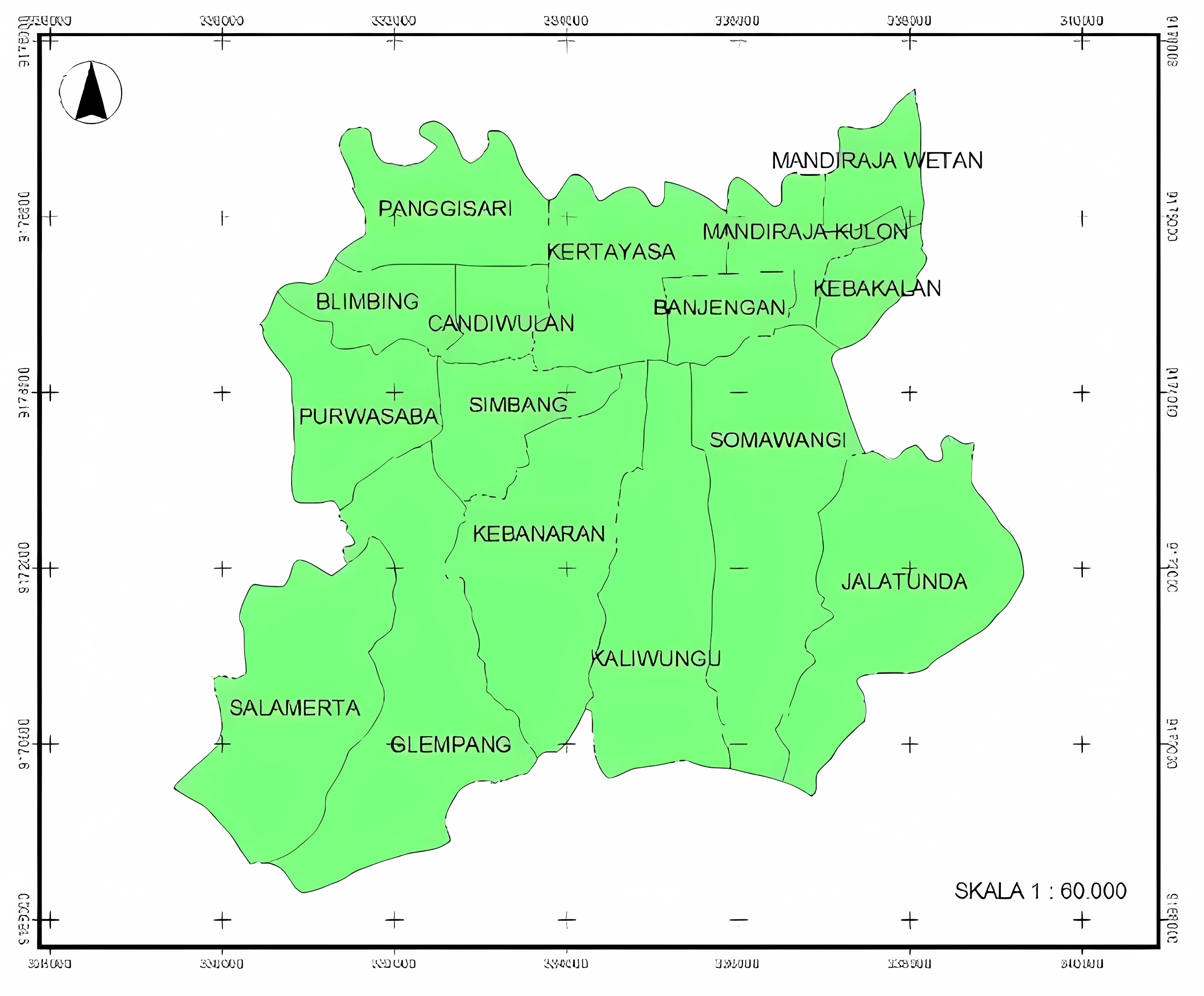
Map of villages in Mandiraja

Salamerta is a village in the town of Mandiraja, Banjarnegara Regency, Central Java Province, Indonesia. This village had an area of 472.74 hectares and a population of 3.869 inhabitants in 2010.

Location of Salamerta in Indonesia.
