= Simbang, Mandiraja =

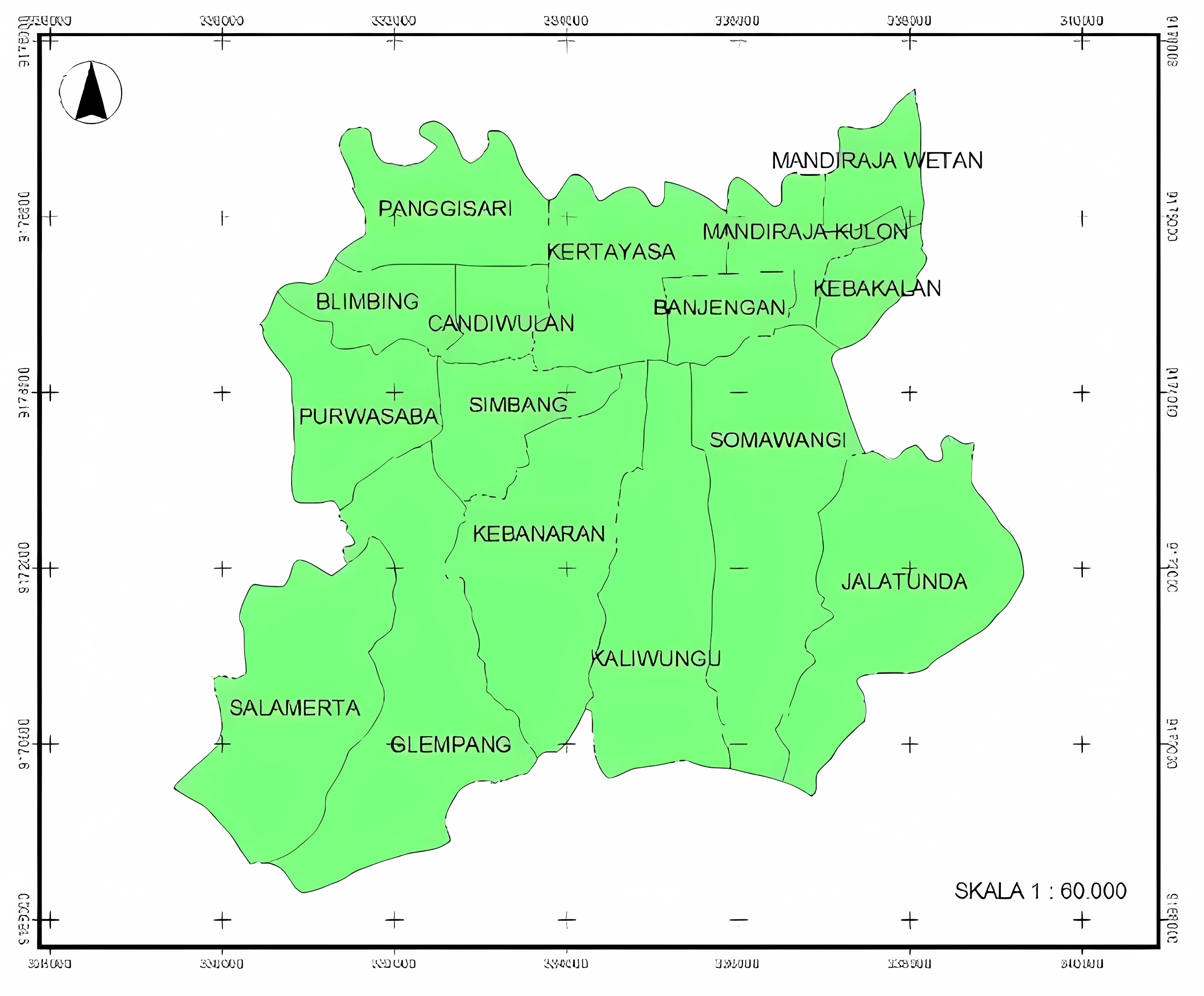
Map of villages in Mandiraja

Simbang (Indonesian pronunciation: [ˈsimbaŋ]) is a village in the town of Mandiraja, Banjarnegara Regency, Central Java Province, Indonesia. This village has an area of 158,50 hectares and a population of 1.929 inhabitants in 2010.
