= Yosorejo =

Coordinates: 6.9245°S 110.031°E

Yosorejo (Indonesian pronunciation: [jɔsɔrəˈd͡ʒɔ]) is a coastal village in Batang Regency, Central Java, Indonesia. Its economy depends on the village's natural resources, particularly fish and rice farming.

The village is the location of several aviaries where swifts are raised.
