= Sampangan =

- Village
- Location in Semarang
- Coordinates: 7°0′S 110°24′E
- Country: Indonesia
- Province: Central Java
- City: Semarang
- District: Gajahmungkur

Area
  - Total: 0.96 km^{2} (0.37 sq mi)
- Time zone: UTC+7 (IWST)
- Postcode: 50236
- Area code: (+62) 24
- Vehicle registration: H

Sampangan (Indonesian pronunciation: [samˈpaŋan]) is a village in the Gajahmungkur district within the city of Semarang in Central Java, Indonesia.

== History ==
During the reign of Paku Buwana III (1749-1778) soldiers from Madura formed a unit in the Abang palace in Lombok. They settled in the village named Sampangan.

== Events ==
Each year in the month of Javanese calendar squeeze on always held the earth or charity event known as the "terminal". every citizen to take part in the celebration with carnival mengkikuti the main road through village.

== Features ==
The main streets in Sampangan are: Jalan Menoreh Raya, Jalan Lamongan Raya, Jalan Papandayan, Jalan Kendeng, Jalan Sampangan Baru, Jalan Bukit Unggul and Jalan Dewi Sartika.

The center of activity in Sampangan is Perempatan Sampangan (Sampangan crossroads), here can be found Pasar Sampangan (Sampangan Traditional Market), Sampangan Mosque, and Perumnas. Now Sampangan Traditional Market was moved to Tugu Suharto at Jalan Dewi Sartika. Sampangan is the pilot project for a housing complex in Indonesia by Perumnas

The saint Jumadil Kubra has ties with the Semarang area. One version of the Babad Tanah Jawi has him perform his tapa in the Bergota hills, south of present Semarang. A grave located between the coastal fishponds at a place called Terbaya, not far from Semarang, is locally known as the maqam ('Station') of Sèh Jumadil Kubra. Elsewhere in the Semarang area, at Sampangan, there is a petilasan named after him.
