= Bungasan =

Village in Indonesia

- Location within Indonesia
- Coordinates: 7.476944°S 110.034164°E
- Country: Indonesia
- Region: Java
- Province: Central Java
- Regency: Wonosobo

Bungasan (Indonesian pronunciation: [buˈŋasan]) is a village in Indonesia, in the southeast of the Wonosobo Regency. It is located in the desa Tanjunganom and the kecamatan Kepil, at the foot of Mount Sumbing, and surrounded by sugarcane plantations.
