= Pokak =

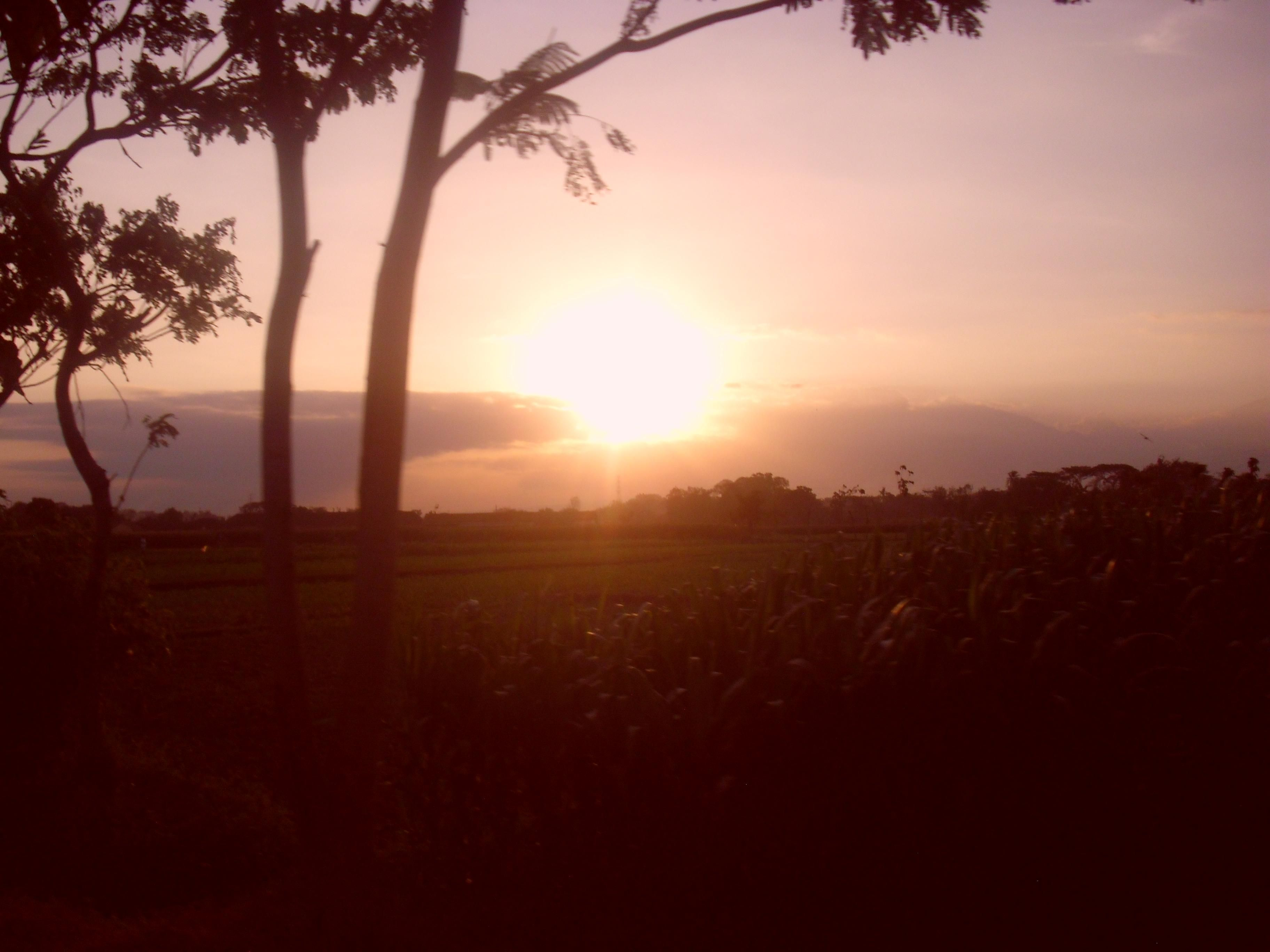
- Sunset in Pokak

- Location within Indonesia
- Coordinates: 7°41′57″S 110°36′3″E
- Country: Indonesia
- Province: Central Java

Area
  - Total: 1.38 km^{2} (0.53 sq mi)
- Elevation: 133 m (436 ft)

Population (2011)
  - Total: 3,042
- Time zone: UTC+7 (WIB)
- Postal code: 57465
- Area code: 0272

Pokak is a village in Indonesia, part of the Ceper sub-district of Klaten. It is separated into two sub-villages, Pokak and Tegal Duwur, separated by farmland, Pokak is divided further into West and East Pokak.

== Geography ==
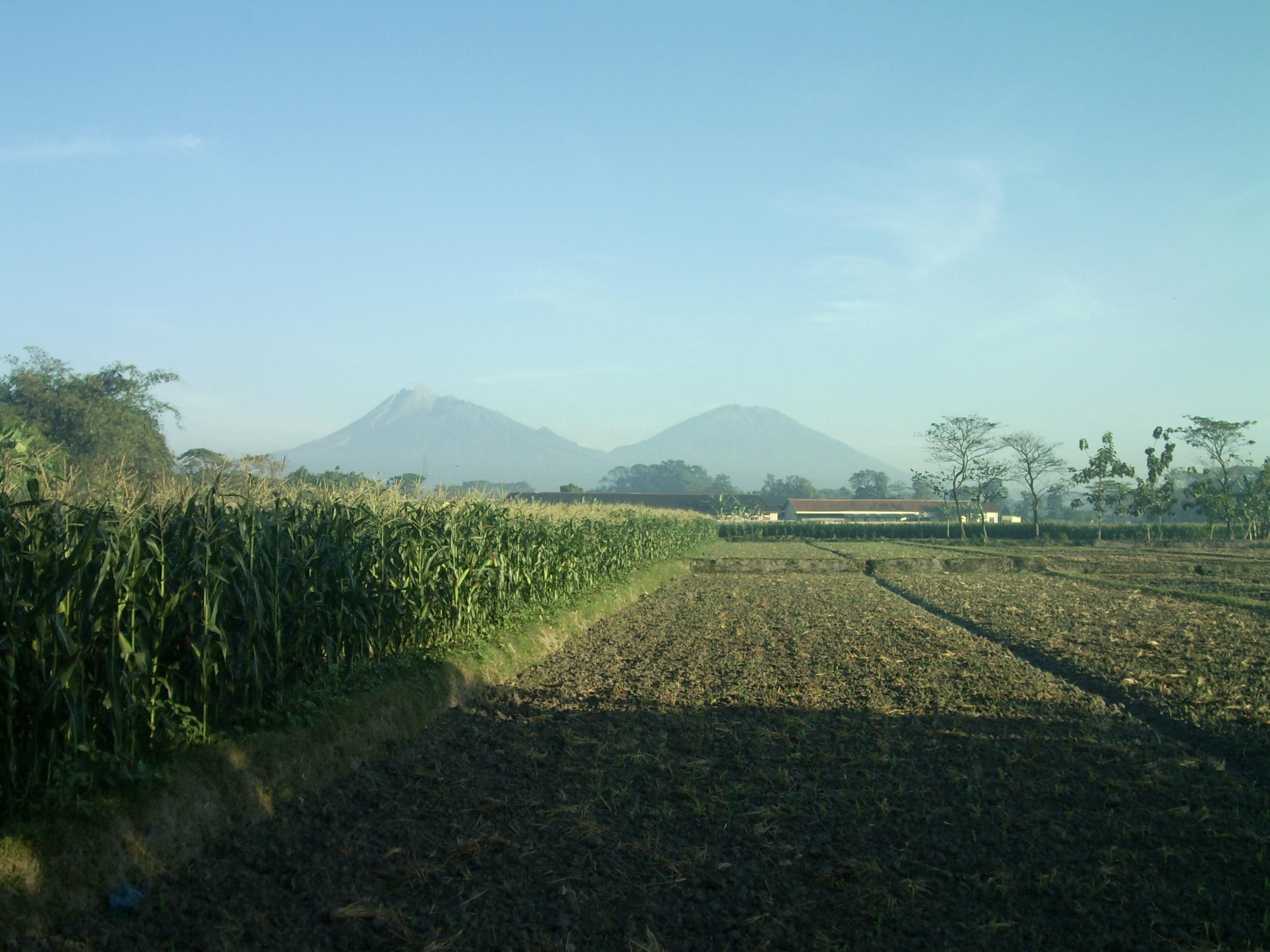
Mount Merapi as seen from Pokak

Pokak is located between Yogyakarta and Solo. It is near the main road, but it is not used by most people thus not many know of the village. It shares its climate with the rest of Java, with summer and rainy seasons. Temperature ranges between 27 and 33* C. Mount Merapi is nearby. The area is fertile and elevated.

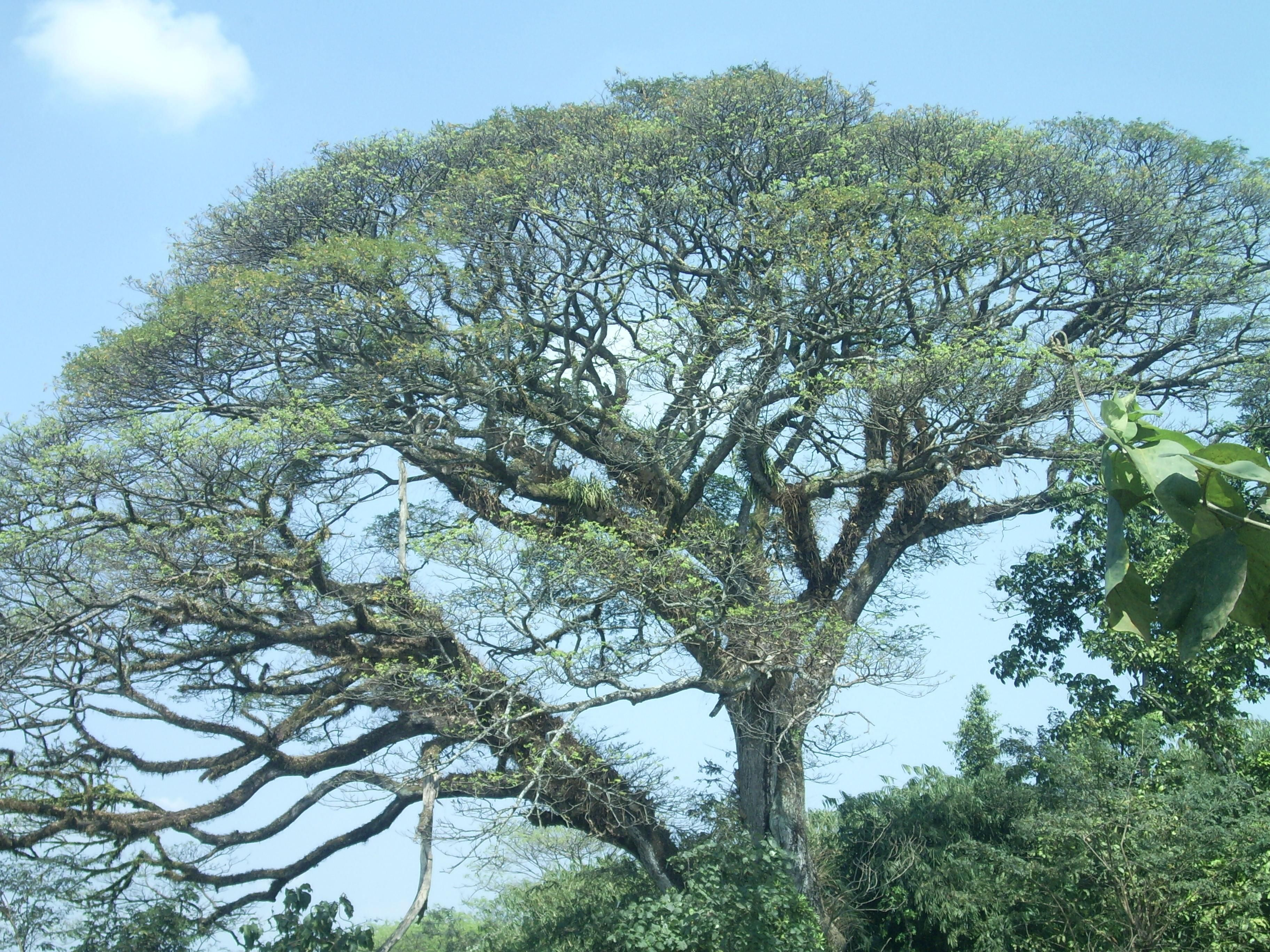
Pokak is a house for gigantic trees

== Demographics ==
The population is about 3,000 people, with almost equal numbers of females and males. 99% of the population is Muslim and the rest are Christians. Half of the population is working class, and most are in farming. This village and most of the area support PDI-P, one of the major political parties.

== Garbage disposal ==
The method of garbage disposal commonly used in Indonesia is by utilizing garbage collectors (dump trucks) that periodically collect the refuse. This method is not used in this village. Instead, each household deals with its own garbage. Most burn it in a hole in the ground. Non-combustible garbage is buried or disposed of at an unmaintained dump site.

== Religion ==
The village has several masjid, which are not evenly distributed. It has 2 churches, one within the village and one on the outskirts.

== Health care ==
There are 2 local clinics in the village, one in Pokak and one in Tegal Duwur. Currently they handle minor injuries and diseases. For severe conditions, villagers travel to the city hospital, about 5 km away.

== Education ==
Two elementary schools are present. Higher-level students attend school outside the village. An English and math learning center operates in Tegal Duwur.

== Economy ==
This area depends on farming. It mainly produces rice and corn and some sugarcane. Most villagers livestock, including breed chickens, ducks, goats, cows and sheep. Livestock are mostly a food reserve.

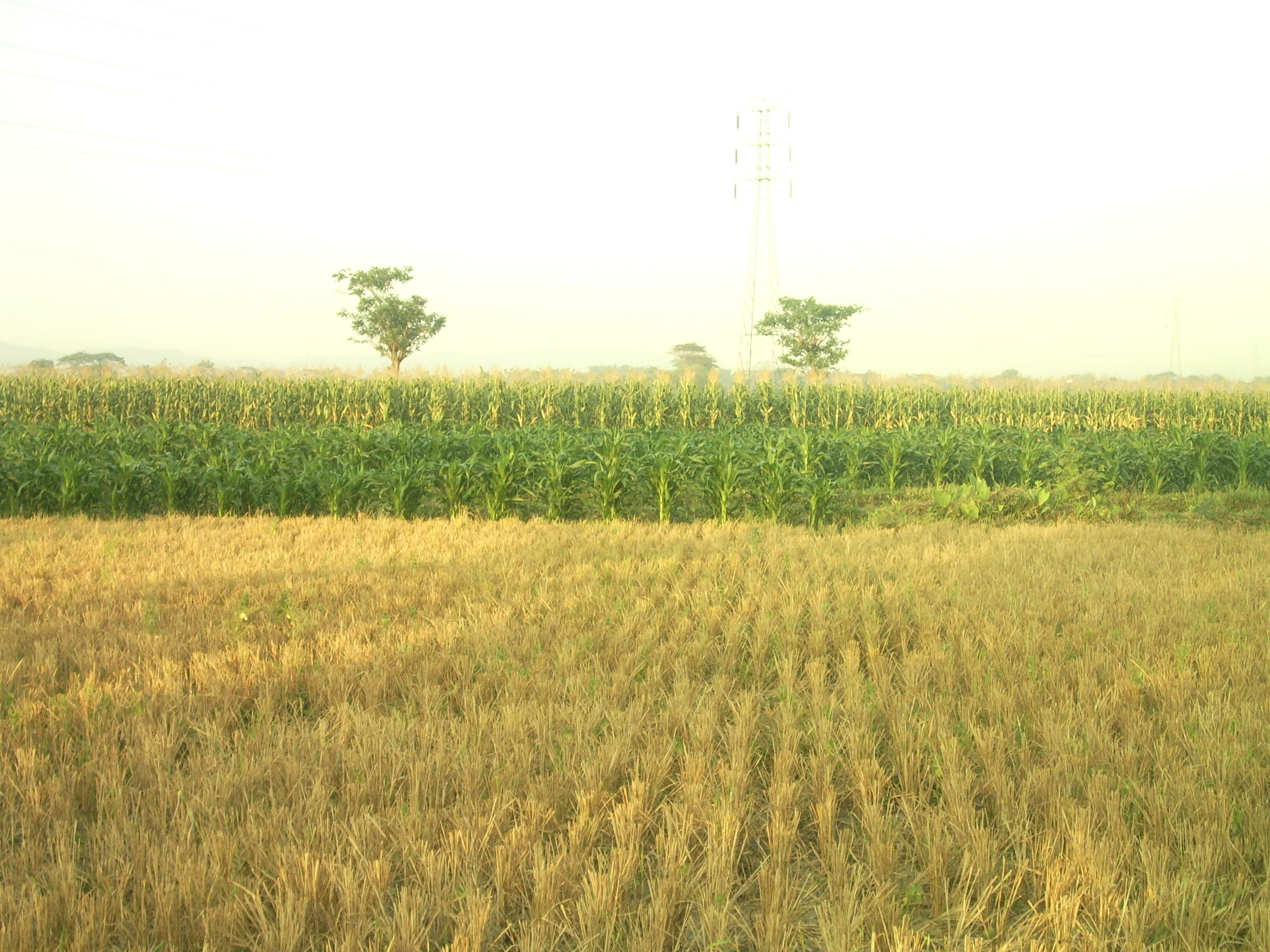
A glimpse of farm in Pokak

The youth mostly work as wood crafters. They produce detailed models of living and non-living things. The most notable work is of an elephant, which can be about the same as a baby elephant, or 2 metres tall.

In the Tegal Duwur area, most villagers practice woodworking. They are the primary supplier for Yogyakarta and its surrounding region, including the Prambanan Temple Complex. The village itself solely functions as factory, although stores in the outskirt of the village sell the works.

=== Woodcraft Gallery ===
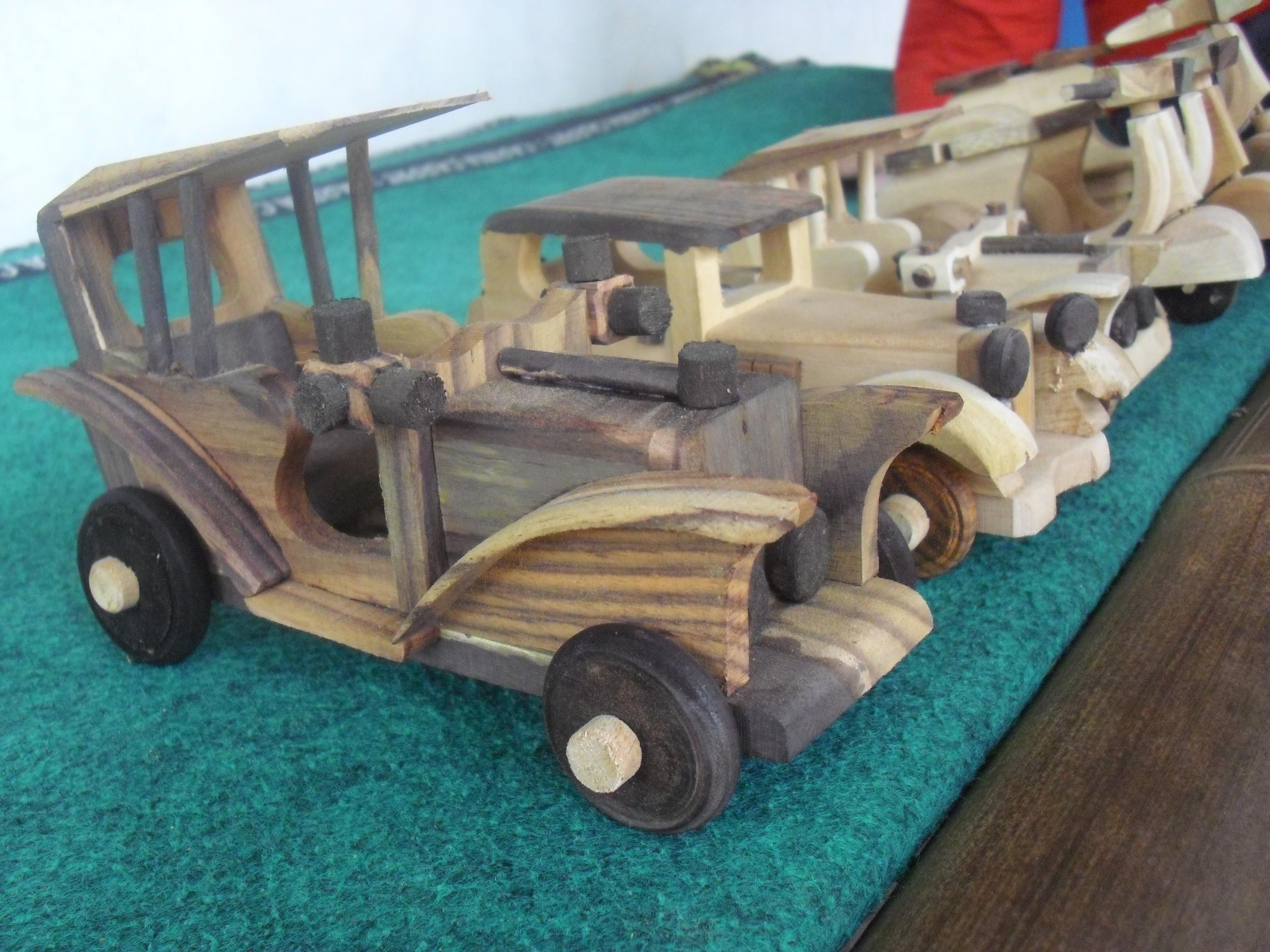

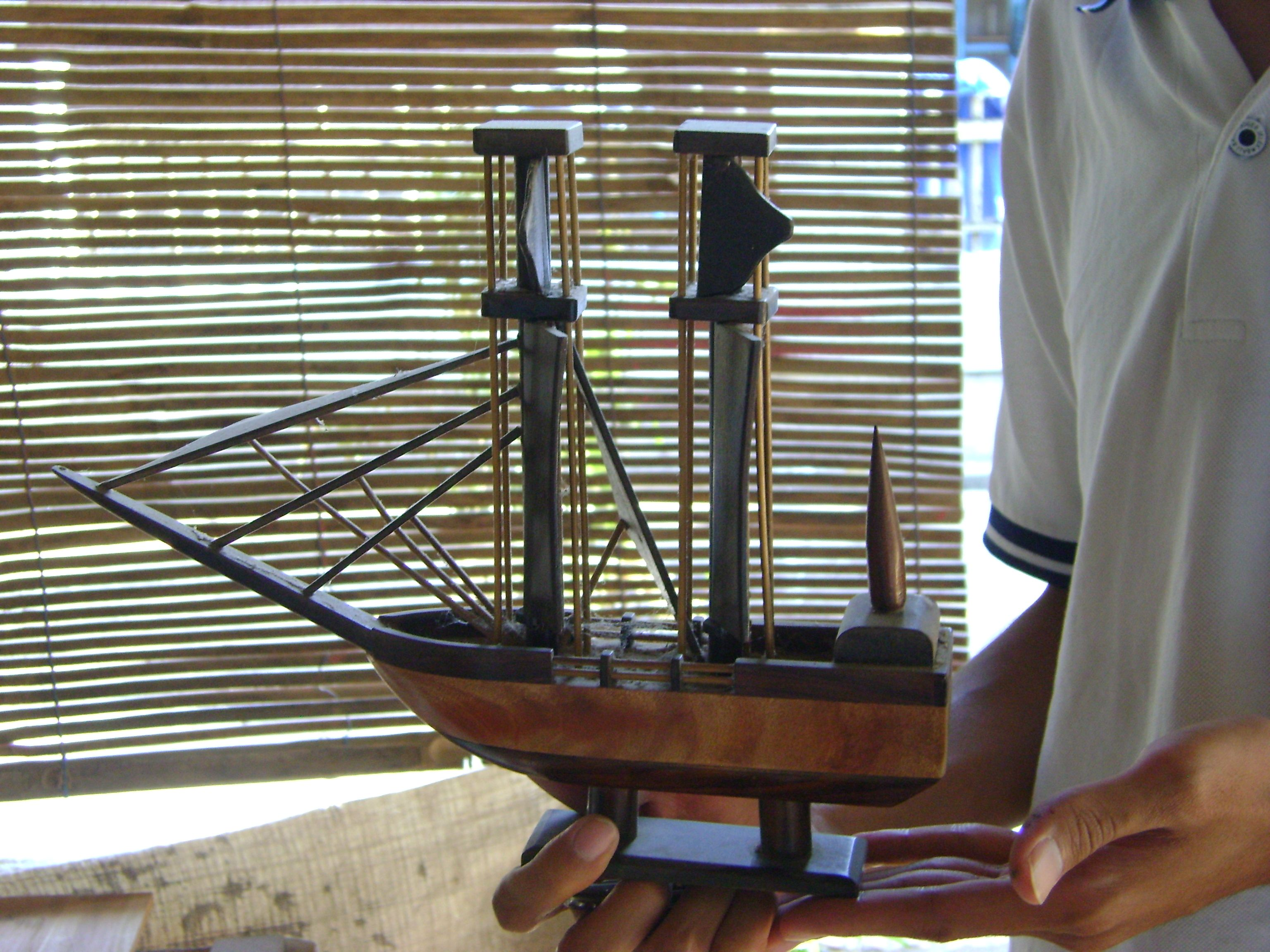

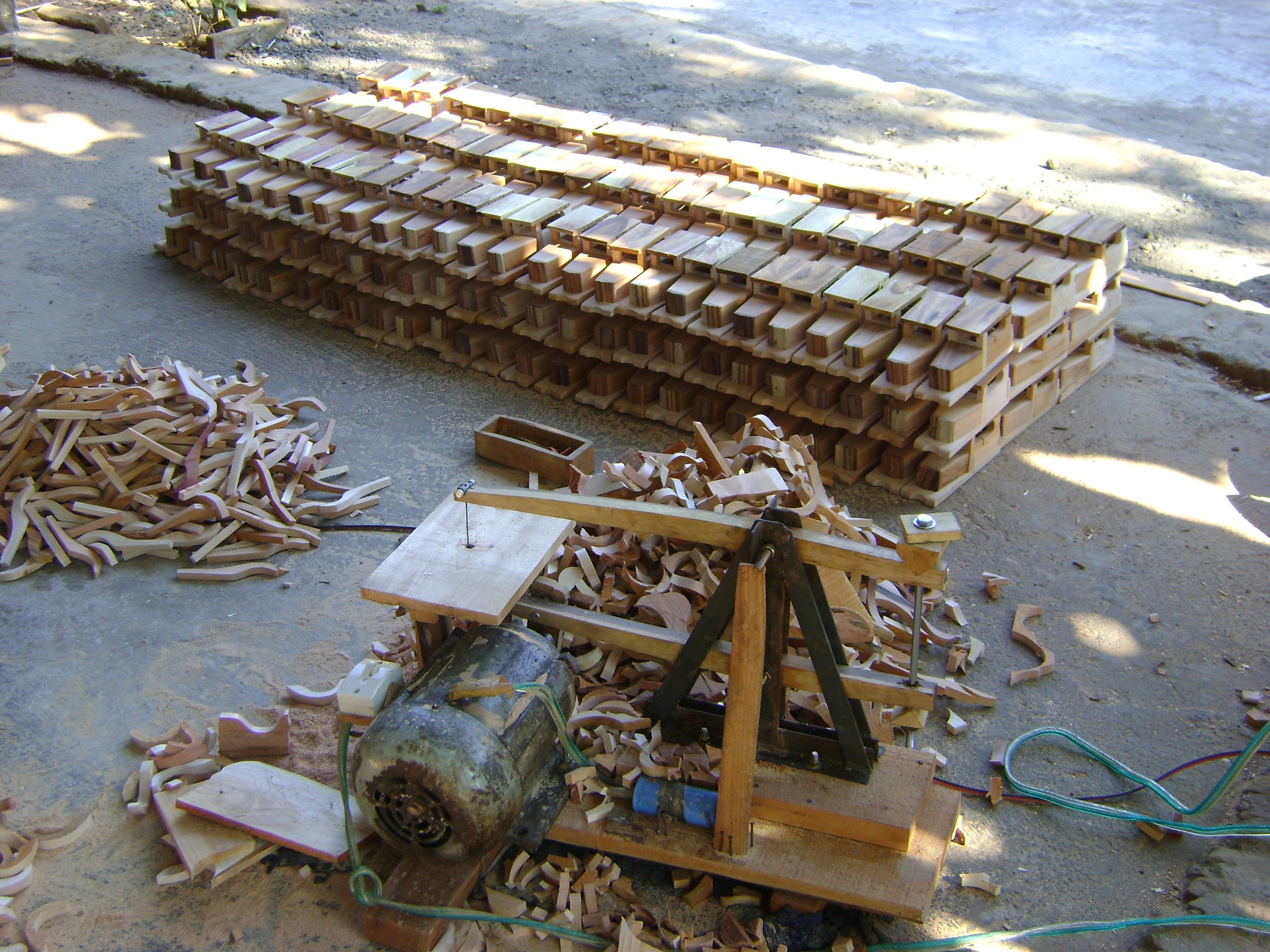

== Main attraction ==
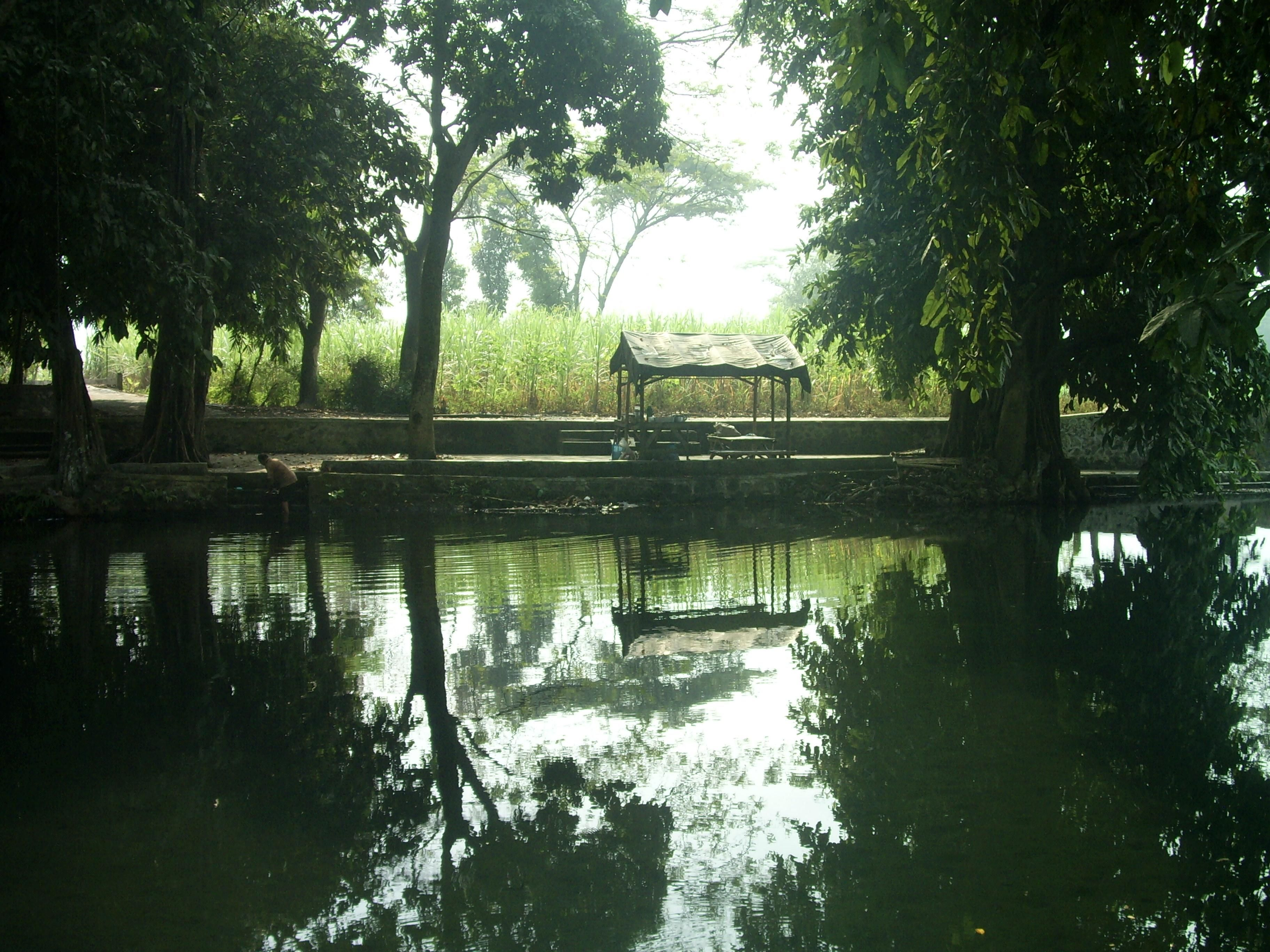
Sendang Sinongko, once a popular tourism spot

The village had a tourism attraction, Sendang Sinongko, a spring, which was popular as a fishing and bathing spot. It was shut down because of management difficulties. The spring is still used annually as an altar for a major ritual ceremony. It attracts thousands of visitor every year.
