= Tonggalan =

Administrative subdistrict in Indonesia

Tonggalan (Indonesian pronunciation: [t̪ɔŋˈɡalan]) is an administrative subdistrict in Klaten Tengah, Klaten Regency, Central Java, Indonesia. Tonggalan is divided into several small villages, including Jamalan Kidul, Jamalan Lor, Mlinjon, Randualas, Candirejo, Klaseman, Kauman.
