= Kiyangkongrejo =

Village in Purworejo Regency, Central Java, Indonesia

Coordinates: 7.7609°S 109.9133°E

Kiyangkongrejo (Indonesian pronunciation: [kijaŋkɔŋrəˈd͡ʒɔ]) is a village in Kutoarjo district, Purworejo Regency, in the province of Central Java, Indonesia.

Kiyangkongrejo is located approximately 68 kilometers east of the city of Yogyakarta. Notable sites in Kiyangkongrejo include the Masjid Al-Ikhlas Kiyangkongrejo, Masjid Al Dzkro, and the special education school Pondok Pesantren Al Kholash.

== Hamlets ==
Based on its geographical location, Kiyangkongrejo is divided into three hamlets:

- Kiyangkongrejo Lor (northern)
- Kiyangkongrejo Kidul (southern)
- Kiyangkongrejo Wetan (eastern)

Kiyangkongrejo Wetan (eastern) is divided into two sub-hamlets:

- Njebor — South of Kiyangkongrejo Wetan
- Kedung Sumur — North of Kiyangkongrejo Wetan

The division of the hamlets is based on the location of the main road, which divides the village into three sections. This division is intended for ease of reference; administratively, all of the government affairs are centralized under the Village Head.
