= Mandiraja, Banjarnegara =

Mandiraja district Kecamatan Mandiraja Kacamatan Mandiraja
- district
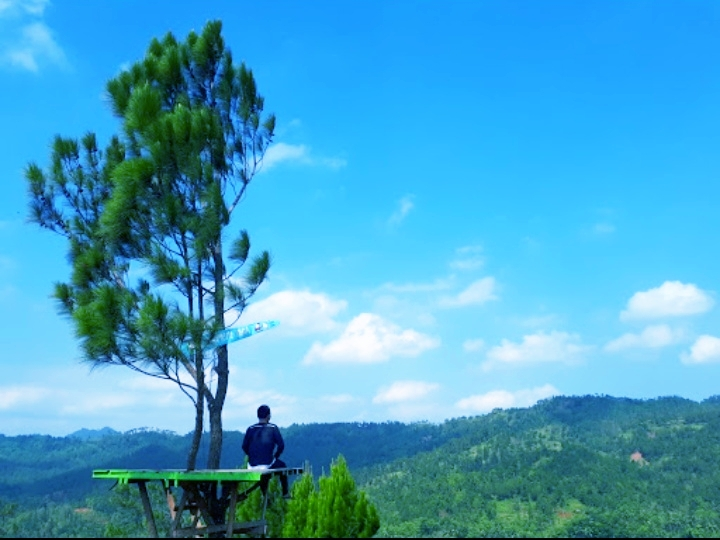
- Bukit watu sodong in Mandiraja
- Motto: nyawiji bedane (United in difference)
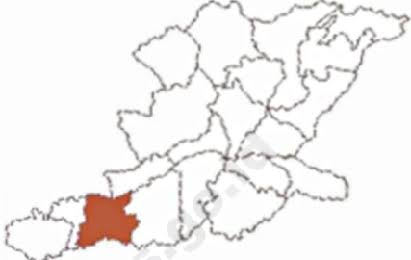
- Location in Banjarnegara Regency

- Location in Java and Indonesia Mandiraja district (Indonesia) Mandiraja district (Asia)
- Coordinates: 7°28′20″S 109°30′48″E
- Country: Indonesia
- Province: Central Java
- Regency: Banjarnegara

Government
  - Camat: Tuslam, S.Sos
  - Sekretaris: Endang Retnowati

Area
  - Total: 52.62 km^{2} (20.32 sq mi)
- Elevation: 132 m (433 ft)

Population (mid 2024 estimate)
  - Total: 83,462
  - Density: 1,586/km^{2} (4,108/sq mi)
- Time zone: UTC+7 (Indonesia Western Time)
- Postcode: 53473
- Area code: 0286
- Licence plate: R
- Website: mandiraja.banjarnegarakab.go.id

Mandiraja (Indonesian pronunciation: [mandiˈrad͡ʒa]) is a district (kecamatan) in Banjarnegara Regency, Central Java, Indonesia. The district has an area of 52.62 km², with a population of 78,090 people at the 2020 Indonesian population census, and which was officially estimated to have reached 83,462 in mid 2024. Mandiraja is also 6 km east of the General Sudirman Airport.

== Borders ==
Mandiraja district is located in between 7°27'10" S and 109°31'22" E and is bordered by :

North	Purbalingga Regency and Rakit District
South	Kebumen Regency
West	Purwareja Klampok District
East	Purwanegara District

== Village list ==
Mandiraja District comprises 16 villages (desa) and is further divided into 388 (RT) and 73 (RW). The following is the population of Mandiraja District by village in 2020:

Village	population 2020
Mandirajakulon	6,417
Mandirajawetan	5,042
Banjengan	2,472
Simbang	2,498
Kebakalan	1,660
Kertayasa	6,899
Candiwulan	2,683
Panggisari	5,155
Blimbing	2,653
Purwasaba	7.291
Glempang	6,585
Kebanaran	5,795
Kaliwungu	4,498
Somawangi	9,051
Jalatunda	5,492
Salamerta	5,068

== Geography ==
Mandiraja District is part of the Banjarnegara Regency administrative area, located in the southwest in terms of the layout and geography of the area, the type of land area or shape including the Serayu River basin, which stretches from the same direction to the northern boundary between Mandiraja and Purbalingga Regency.

The distance from Mandiraja District to the capital of the Banjarnegara Regency is about 21 km, and is located at an altitude of 132 metres above sea level. The condition of the area consists of lowland and hilly areas; Salamerta village, Glempang, Kebanaran, Somawangi and Jalatunda village are villages where the land is hilly, while the other 11 villages are low-lying areas.

== Climate & Weather ==
Mandiraja has a tropical climate, with humidity ranging between +50-90%, peaking in December to March, with the lowest levels in July to September. The average rainfall annual is ±2.586 mm/year with a number of rainy days ± 188 days, with the rainy season occurring from November to March and the dry season from April to October.

== Demography ==
In 2010, the district had a population of 63,779 inhabitants. In the 2020 census, Mandiraja District had the third-largest population in the Banjarnegara Regency after the Punggelan and Purwanegara districts, with 78,090 inhabitants, which is spread over 16 villages. The official estimate as at mid 2024 was 83,462. Mandiraja has a gender difference ratio of 102.28 to 100, and an average annual population growth of 1.09% between 2020 and 2024. Mandiraja is inhabited by various ethnic groups; the Javanese ethnic group is indigenous to this region, while besides them in Mandiraja there are also other ethnic groups such as Sundanese, Chinese, Arabs And others.

Ethnic groups in Mandiraja District 2020
ethnic	person(%)
Javanese	97.82%
Sundanese	1.06%
Arab	0.47%
Chinese	0.20%
Other	0.45%

== Education ==
Achievement in the field of education in the Mandiraja District is closely related to educational facilities at the elementary school level in Mandiraja. In the 2018/2019 school year a teacher on average teaches 16 elementary school students, the higher the level of education the teacher burden is also increasingly increased, for junior high school education ( junior high school ) an average teacher reaches 25 junior high school students.

== Culture ==
Mandiraja has a traditional culture, including Wayang Kulit, a traditional Javanese art. In addition, there is a traditional musical instrument, the calung, a kind of idiophone made from bamboo, which is played by hitting the blades or segment.
