= Banjarnegara =

Town in Central Java, Indonesia

Coordinates: 7°23′46″S 109°41′42.58″E

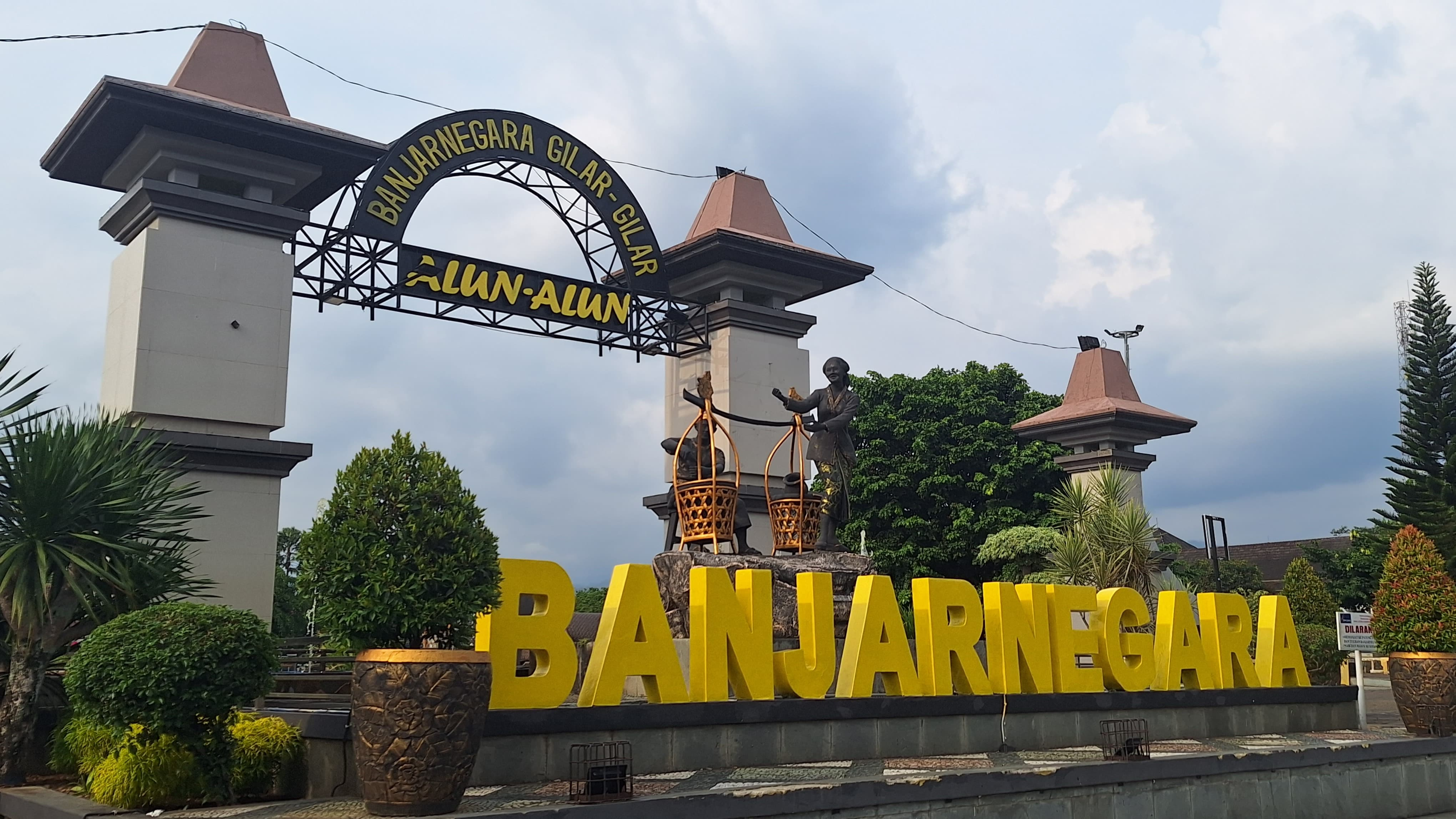
Banjarnegara town square

Banjarnegara is a town in Central Java, Indonesia and the seat of Banjarnegara Regency. It is 55 km from the Dieng Plateau region and a centre for ceramic arts.

== Climate ==
Banjarnegara has a tropical rainforest climate (Af) with moderate rainfall from June to September and heavy to very heavy rainfall from October to May. It is one of the wettest towns in Indonesia.

Climate data for Banjarnegara
| Month | Jan | Feb | Mar | Apr | May | Jun | Jul | Aug | Sep | Oct | Nov | Dec | Year |
|---|---|---|---|---|---|---|---|---|---|---|---|---|---|
| Mean daily maximum °C (°F) | 29.3 (84.7) | 29.6 (85.3) | 29.9 (85.8) | 29.9 (85.8) | 29.9 (85.8) | 29.8 (85.6) | 29.4 (84.9) | 29.7 (85.5) | 30.1 (86.2) | 30.4 (86.7) | 29.6 (85.3) | 29.2 (84.6) | 29.7 (85.5) |
| Daily mean °C (°F) | 25.0 (77.0) | 25.2 (77.4) | 25.5 (77.9) | 25.5 (77.9) | 25.4 (77.7) | 24.9 (76.8) | 24.1 (75.4) | 24.4 (75.9) | 24.9 (76.8) | 25.4 (77.7) | 25.2 (77.4) | 24.9 (76.8) | 25.0 (77.1) |
| Mean daily minimum °C (°F) | 20.8 (69.4) | 20.8 (69.4) | 21.1 (70.0) | 21.2 (70.2) | 21.0 (69.8) | 20.0 (68.0) | 18.9 (66.0) | 19.1 (66.4) | 19.7 (67.5) | 20.4 (68.7) | 20.9 (69.6) | 20.6 (69.1) | 20.4 (68.7) |
| Average rainfall mm (inches) | 498 (19.6) | 433 (17.0) | 557 (21.9) | 455 (17.9) | 315 (12.4) | 122 (4.8) | 119 (4.7) | 98 (3.9) | 113 (4.4) | 294 (11.6) | 488 (19.2) | 546 (21.5) | 4,038 (158.9) |
Source: Climate-Data.org
