= Persian, Indonesia =

Village in Indonesia

Coordinates: 06°31′36″S 110°41′33″E

Persian is a populated place in Jepara Regency, Central Java on the island of Java, Indonesia.

== See also ==
- Jepara
