= Simbang, Maros =

District in South Sulawesi, Indonesia

Simbang
- District
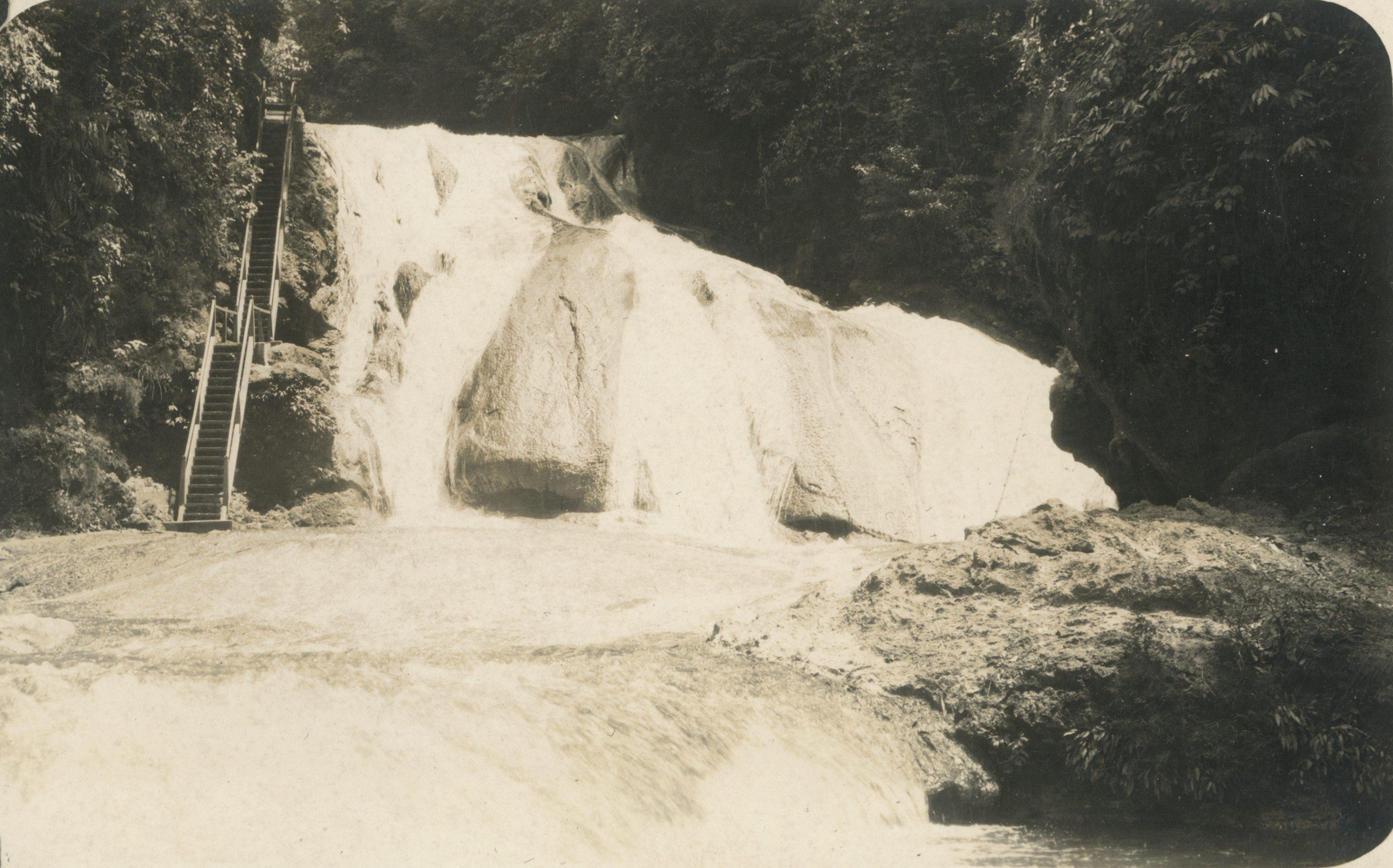
- Waterfall at Bantimoeroeng, Simbang (1930)
- Interactive map of Simbang
- Location Simbang (Indonesia)
- Coordinates: 5°4′1.389″S 119°41′36.6634″E
- Country: Indonesia
- Province: South Sulawesi
- Regency: Maros
- District seat: Jenetaesa

Area
  - Total: 105.31 km^{2} (40.66 sq mi)

Population (mid 2023)
  - Total: 26,038
  - Density: 247.25/km^{2} (640.38/sq mi)
- Time zone: UTC+8 (ICT)
- Regional code: 73.09.09
- Villages: 6

Simbang is a district in Maros Regency, South Sulawesi Province, Indonesia. In mid-2023, this district was inhabited by 26,038 people. This district has an area of 105.31 km^{2} and its capital is located in Jenetaesa village.

== Geography ==
Simbang is divided into the following 6 villages desa:

- Bonto Tallasa
- Jenetaesa
- Samangki
- Sambueja
- Simbang
- Tanete
