= Ledok =

Coordinates: 6°53′18″S 111°13′23″E

Ledok Ledok, Ledhok
- Village
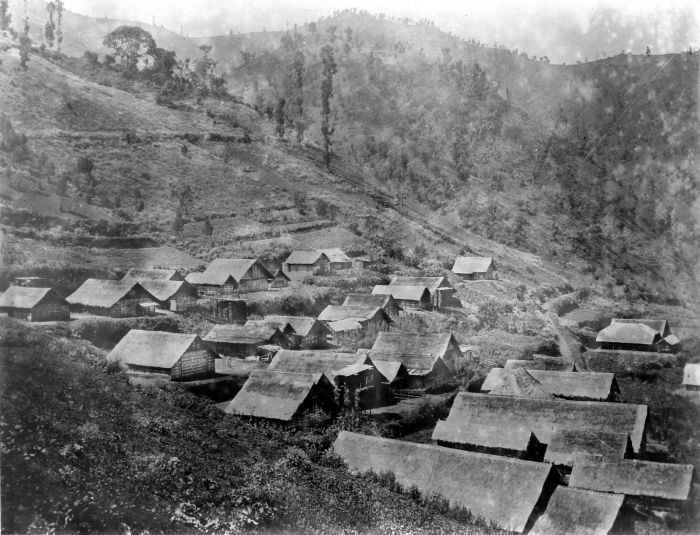
- Ledok in the early 20th century
- Interactive map of Ledok
- Country: Indonesia
- Province: Central Java
- Regency: Blora
- District: Sambong
- Postal code: 58371

Ledok (Javanese: Ledhok) is a village in the Sambong District, Blora, Central Java, Indonesia.
