= Glempang =

Village in Banjarnegara Regency, Central Java, Indonesia

Coordinates: 7.501201899999999°S 109.4824312°E

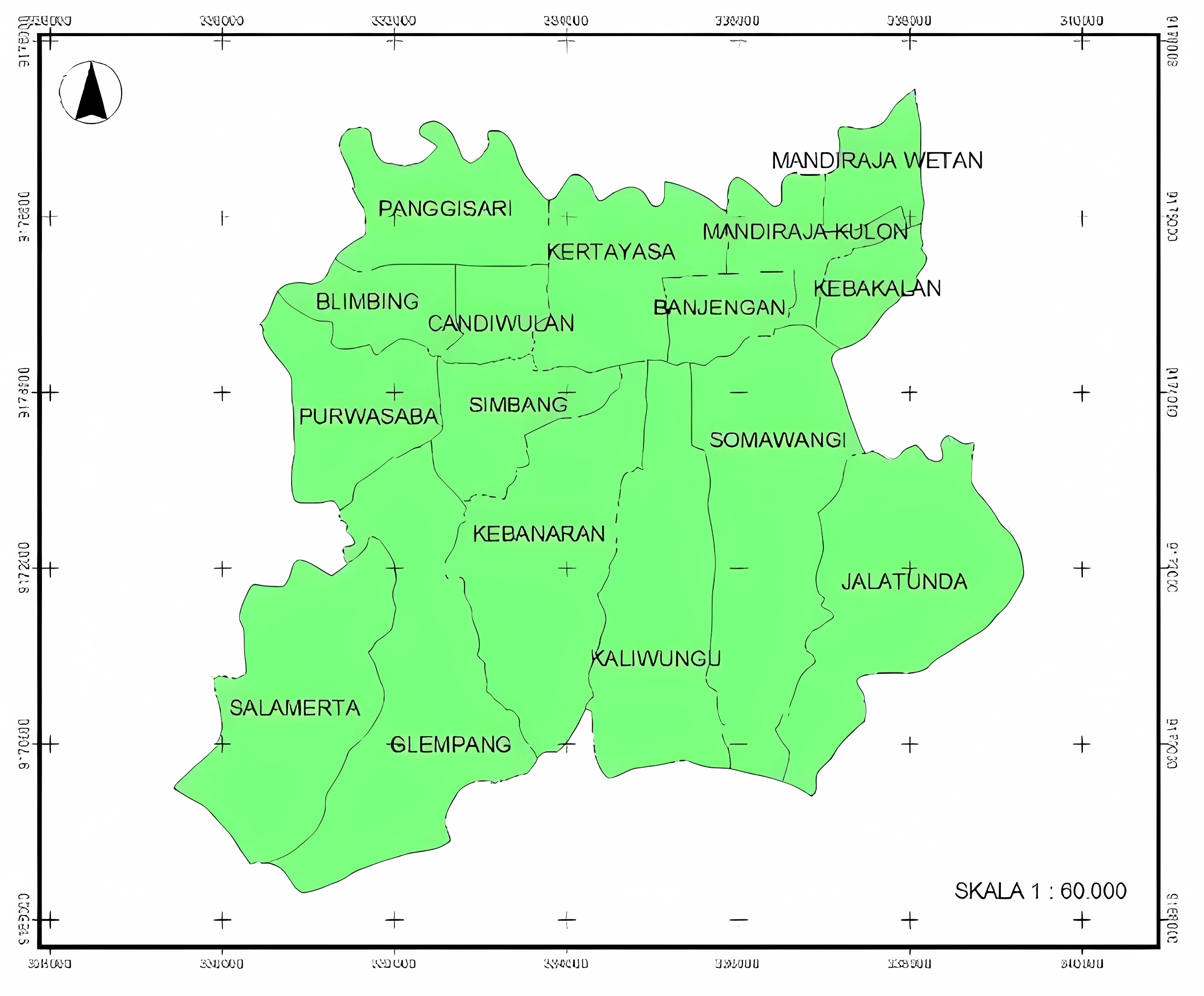
Map of villages in Mandiraja

Glempang (Indonesian pronunciation: [ɡləmˈpaŋ]) is a village in the town of Mandiraja, Banjarnegara Regency, Central Java Province, Indonesia. It has an area of 569,91 hectares and had a population of 4.965 inhabitants in 2010.
