= Cangak =

Village in Central Java, Indonesia

Cangak (Indonesian pronunciation: [ˈt͡ʃaŋaʔ]) is a village in the Bodeh district, Pemalang Regency, Central Java, Indonesia. Its postcode is 52365.
