= Derpowangsan =

Village in Indonesia

Coordinates: 07°25′14″S 110°23′30″E

Derpowangsan is a populated place in Magelang Regency, Central Java, Indonesia.

== See also ==
- Mount Merbabu
- Mount Telomoyo
