= Banjarnegara Regency =

Regency in Central Java, Indonesia

Banjarnegara Regency Kabupaten Banjarnegara
- Regency
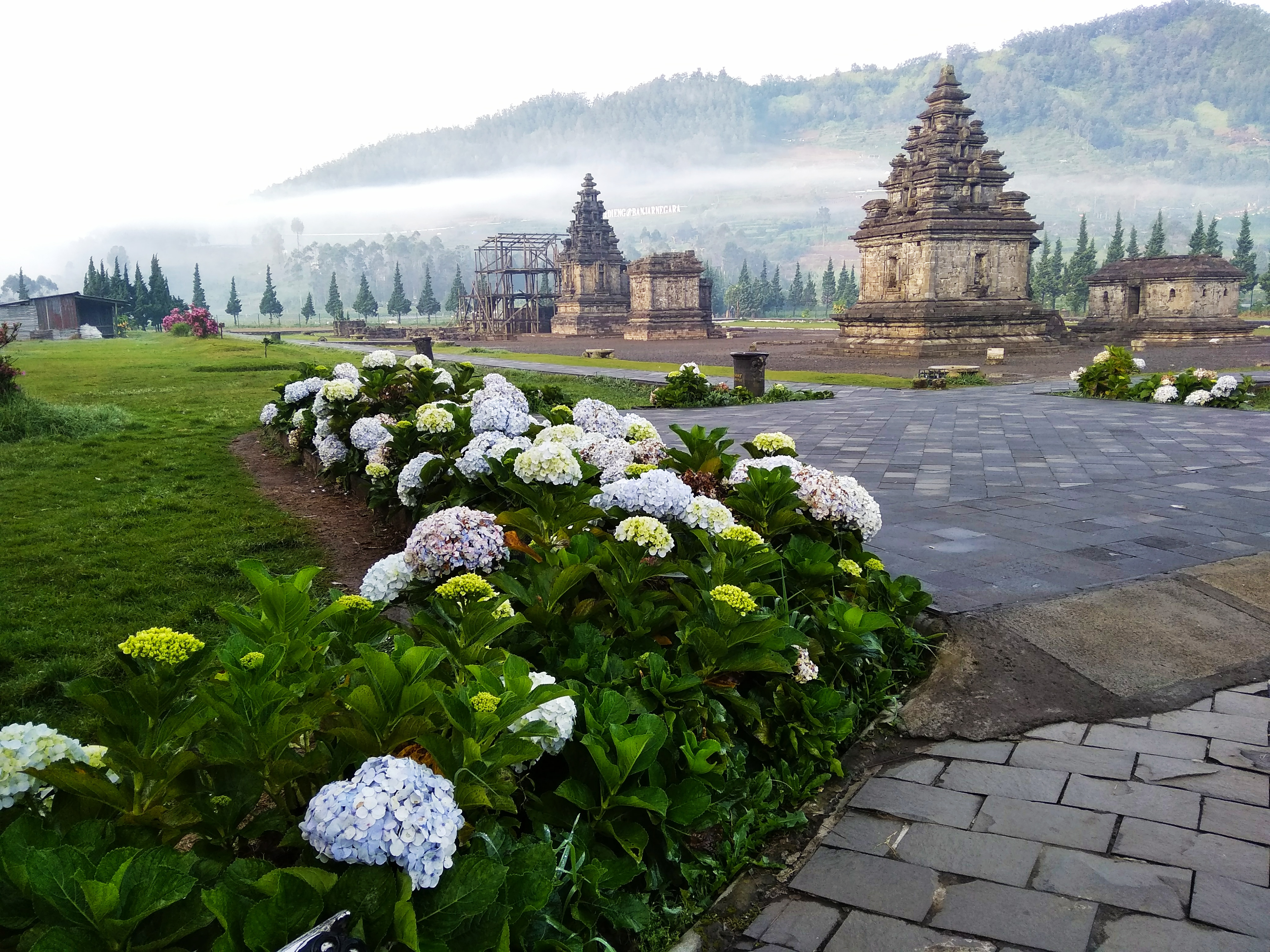
- Dieng temples

- Coat of arms
- Motto: Manunggaling Swara Tumataning Praja
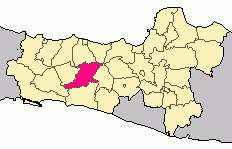
- Location within Central Java

- Location in Java and Indonesia Banjarnegara Regency (Indonesia)
- Coordinates: 7°23′46″S 109°45′27″E
- Country: Indonesia
- Province: Central Java
- Capital: Banjarnegara

Government
  - Regent: Amalia Desiana
  - Vice Regent: Wakhid Jumali

Area
  - Total: 1,069.71 km^{2} (413.02 sq mi)

Population (mid 2025 estimate)
  - Total: 1,067,606
  - Density: 998.033/km^{2} (2,584.89/sq mi)
- Time zone: UTC+7 (WIB)
- Area code: +62 286
- Website: banjarnegarakab.go.id

Banjarnegara (Indonesian: Kabupaten Banjarnegara, pronounced [kabuˌpat̪ɛn baɲd͡ʒarnəˈɡara]; Javanese: Kabupatèn Banjarnegara) is an inland regency (kabupaten) in the southwestern part of Central Java province in Indonesia. The regency covers an area of 1,069.71 km^{2}, and it had a population of 868,913 at the 2010 Census and 1,017,767 at the 2020 Census; the official estimate as of mid 2025 was 1,067,606 (comprising 541,191 males and 526,415 females). The majority speak the Banyumasan dialect of Javanese. Its capital is the town of Banjarnegara.

== Administrative districts ==
Banjarnegara Regency comprises twenty districts (kecamatan), tabulated below with their areas and their populations at the 2010 Census and the 2020 Census, together with the official estimates as of mid 2025. The table also includes the location of the district administrative centres, the number of administrative villages in each district (totalling 266 rural desa and 12 urban kelurahan), and its postal code.

Kode Wilayah	Name of District (kecamatan)	Area in km^{2}	Pop'n 2010 Census	Pop'n 2020 Census	Pop'n mid 2025 estimate	Admin centre	No. of villages	Post code
33.04.01	Susukan	52.66	52,160	62,706	66,584	Susukan	15	53475
33.04.02	Purwareja Klampok	21.87	40,064	47,657	50,345	Klampok	8	53474
33.04.03	Mandiraja	52.62	63,679	78,090	83,720	Mandiraja Kulon	16	53473
33.04.04	Purwanegara	73.87	66,994	81,764	87,456	Purwanegara	13	53472
33.04.05	Bawang	55.21	53,321	63,335	66,861	Mantrianom	18	53471
33.04.06	Banjarnegara (town)	26.24	62,962	69,543	70,877	Kuta Banjarnegara	13 ^{(a)}	53411: 53418
33.04.20	Pagedongan	80.55	33,832	41,736	44,874	Pagedongan	9	53418
33.04.07	Sigaluh	39.56	28,107	31,993	33,085	Gembongan	15 ^{(b)}	53481
33.04.08	Madukara	48.20	40,074	45,952	47,690	Kutayasa	20 ^{(c)}	53482
33.04.09	Banjarmangu	46.36	39,799	46,301	48,390	Banjarmangu	17	53452
33.04.10	Wanadadi	28.27	26,538	33,553	35,187	Wanadadi	11	53461
33.04.11	Rakit	32.45	45,998	53,686	56,196	Rakit	11	53463
33.04.12	Punggelan	102.84	71,658	86,419	91,904	Punggelan	17	53462
33.04.13	Karangkobar	39.07	27,703	31,599	32,710	Leksana	13	53453
33.04.14	Pagentan	46.19	34,028	38,221	39,272	Pagentan	16	53455
33.04.15	Pejawaran	52.25	39,571	44,571	45,858	Penusupan	17	53454
33.04.16	Batur	47.17	36,388	40,826	41,926	Batur	8	53456
33.04.17	Wanayasa	82.01	44,372	50,533	52,271	Wanayasa	17	53457
33.04.18	Kalibening	83.78	39,724	46,156	48,519	Kalibening	16	53458
33.04.19	Pandanarum	58.56	19,841	22,926	23,881	Beji	8	53459
	Totals	1,069.71	868,913	1,017,767	1,067,606	Banjarnegara	278	

Notes: (a) comprising 9 urban keluraham (Argasoka, Karangtengah, Krandegan, Kutabanjarnegara, Parakancanggah, Semampir, Semarang, Sokanandi and Wangon) and 4 desa.
(b) including one kelurahan (Kalibenda). (c) including 2 kelurahan (Kenteng and Rejasa).

== Transport ==
There is a bus terminal called Mandiraja Terminal in this regency.

== Agriculture ==
- Batur sheep

== Climate ==
Heavy tropical rains results in fatal landslides in November 2025.
