= Datar, Indonesia =

Coordinates: 7°12′40″S 108°37′56″E

Datar
- Interactive map of Datar
- Country: Indonesia
- Province: Central Java
- Regency: Cilacap
- District: Dayeuhluhur

Area
  - Total: 1.747 km^{2} (0.675 sq mi)

Population
  - Total: 4,178
  - Density: 2,392/km^{2} (6,194/sq mi)

Datar is a village in the Dayeuhluhur District, Cilacap, Central Java, Indonesia.

== Geography ==
It is located in the hills with an altitude of 200–860 meters. Its highest point is on Mount Ketra (860 m). Datar has a tropical climate with dry and rainy seasons. Daytime temperatures range from 23 - 31 degrees Celsius.

== Tourism ==
Datar gained status as a Tourism Village in 2018. Among the attractions are Cimandaway Curug, Mount Ketra, Reong Curug, Cikawalon and Cidayeuh River, Singaraja Rice Fields, Gunung Datar Petilasan, Ngabeungkat Dawuan Culture and Sidekah Kupat, Batu Papangkuan, Ombyok Dadung Tradition Art, Injuk Industry and palm sugar. It advertises a cool atmosphere of clean natural mountains, safe villages, unique Sundanese culture in Central Java, local wisdom, a long history, and friendly people.

== Adat ==
Ngabeungkat Dawuan is a popular adat in Datar.
