= Sumpinghayu, Cilacap =

Village in Cilacap Regency, Central Java

Sumpinghayu is a village at district Dayeuhluhur, Cilacap Regency, Central Java.

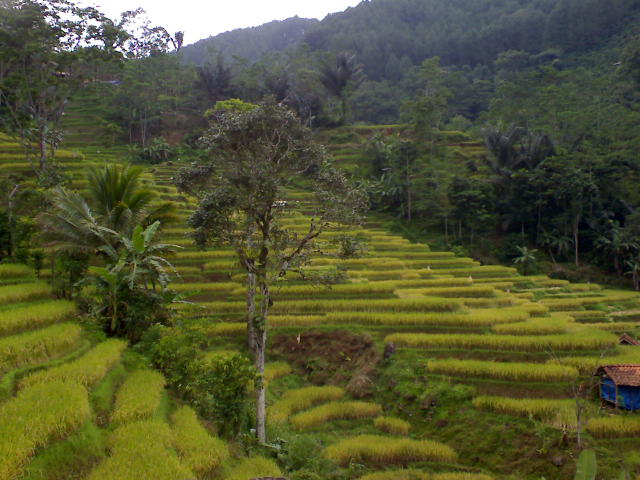
Kopo, Paddy field area at Sumpinghayu village

== Geographic ==
The landscape of Sumpinghayu is mountains and dense forest. Two major rivers flow through this village. Those rivers are the Cidayeuh and Citengah. Sumpinghayu borders West Java to the northeast.

== Culture ==
Majority of the people of Sumpinghayu were Sundanese and speak the Sundanese language using the Kuningan dialect.
