= Pendem =

Pendem may refer to:

- Benteng Pendem (disambiguation)
  - Benteng Pendem (Cilacap)
- Dorababu Pendem, Indian politician
