= Cibeet River =

Coordinates: 7.23152°S 108.58435°E

Cibeet River Sungai Cibeet, Ci Beet, Tjibeei, Tji Beei, Ci Beei, Ci Beel, Tjibeet
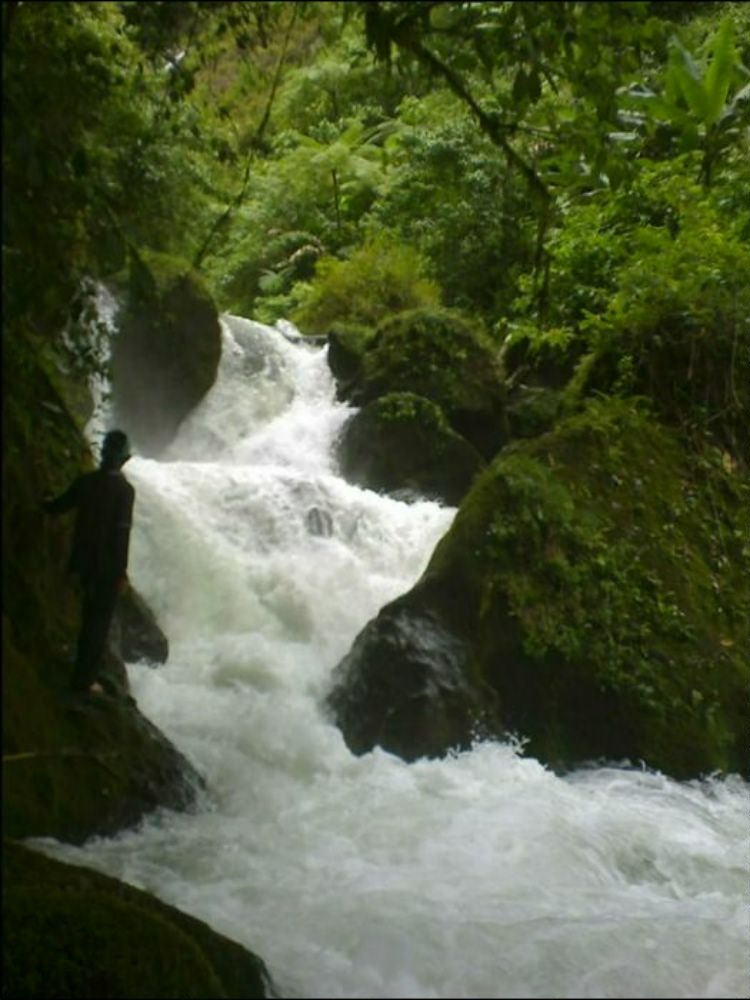

- Location of river mouth Cibeet River (Indonesia)

Location
- Country: Indonesia
- Province: Central Java
- Regency: Cilacap

Basin features
- River system: Citanduy basin

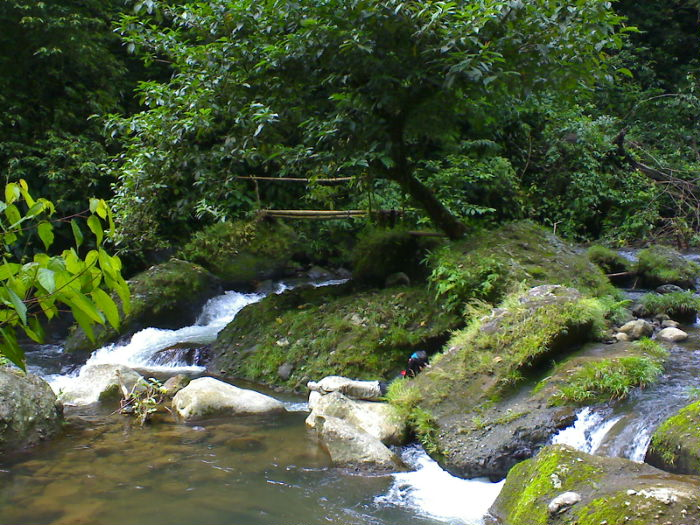
The traditional river crossing at Cibeet river, in Tejakembang, Cijeruk, Dayeuhluhur, Cilacap Regency

Cibeet River is a river in Dayeuhluhur, Cilacap Regency, Central Java, Indonesia, about 220 km southeast of the capital Jakarta.

== Hydrography ==
The river source is at The Forbidden Forest of the Upper Cibeet River, Dayeuhluhur Mountain. Two important tributaries of this river are Cikawalon River and Cidayeuh River.

Its mouth is where it merges into Cijolang river at Bingkeng village.

Cibeet River has the purest river water in Cilacap Regency, because it comes from a dense and undeveloped tropical forest.

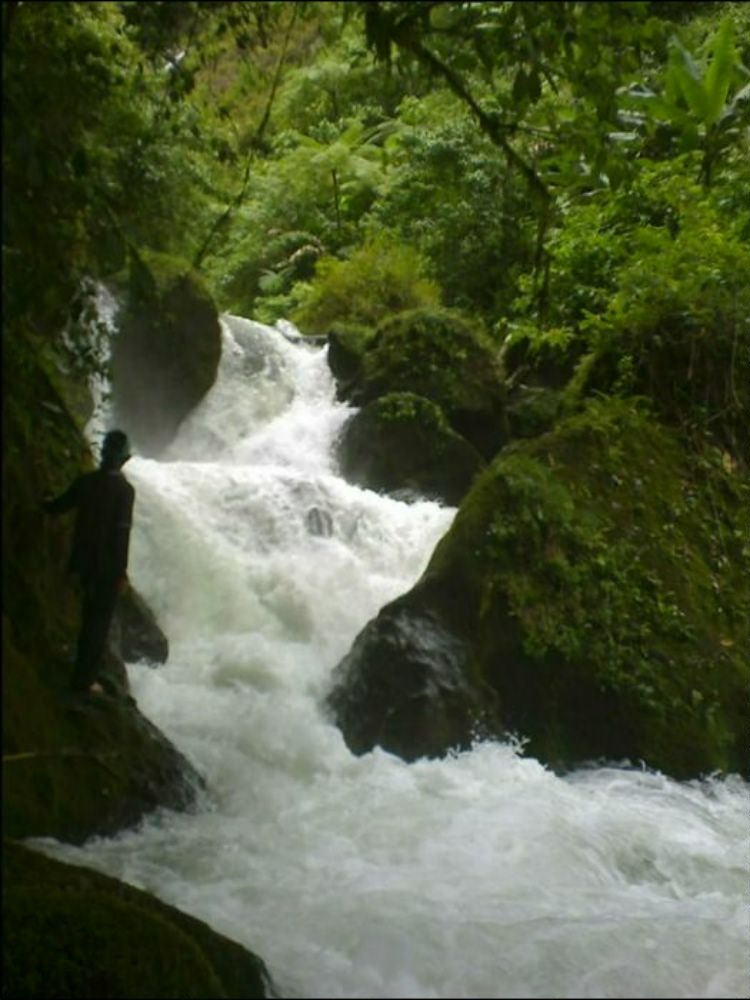
Cijolian waterfall; one of a sacred place at Cibeet River

== Tradition ==
A suspension bridge (local name: Sasak Gayot ) is located on the Cibeet River linking the Nambo and Aria hamlets (dusun) in Bingkeng village (desa), Dayeuhluhur District (kecamatan), since 1970. The bridge is 50 meters long and 1 meter wide, with footing made from woven bamboo and the handle is hung with alternating wires on the left and right sides at both ends of the bridge. The suspension bridge is very vital for the residents of RW 01 Nambo hamlet, which is as the only access to the center of the village of Bingkeng and the community's economic path that is used daily in selling crops, as well as traveling to the center of Bingkeng Village.

On the banks of the Cibeet river there are also tombs of several traditional figures:

- Arya Sacanata or Prince Salingsingan: buried in Nombo hamlet, Bingkeng village, namely in the Sacred Arya Cemetery Complex of Bingkeng Village; a pilgrimage place for the Panjalu descendants and once a location for taking holy water to wash Panjalu Heritage or called "Ritual Nyangku". One of the historical sites which were threatened to be submerged due to the construction of the Matenggeng Dam.
- Raden Haji Alit Prawatasari, a hero from Cianjur who is also a descendant of Panjalu and a contemporary of Arya Sacanata. His tomb is allegedly in Keramat Tejakembang Desa Cijeruk.

The cultural tradition "Babarit kupat" ("sedekah ketupat") or "babaritan" is an annual traditional ritual program of the Sundanese which is held on the same day, month and place every year before the beginning of the month of Maulud. This program is a form of gratitude for the welfare of the village for the adequacy of food and beverages, in addition to asking to be freed from all kinds of disasters such as earthquakes, epidemics, floods and hurricanes. Almost all villagers in Dayeuhluhur District carry out this tradition, in which citizens bring food in the form of ketupat to be hung on a pole prepared by Kokolot Lembur or village elders, and then the elders lead the ritual and pray for salvation and blessing, not only for all local villagers but also for the country Indonesia. Then all the ketupats were eaten at the place, and there were also some that were distributed to the people who passed the road. For the Cijeruk Village area, the event is centered on the Cibeet River Bridge, while in Kutaagung Village is carried out at the village boundary and in West Panulisan Village in Sumanding Pendey Hamlet.

The Cibeet river has a "Keymaster" (juru kunci) to guard its spirituality. In Dayeuhluhuran (Sundanese Religion), this river is sacred. As of 2014, the key is held by Ceceng Rusmana.

== Geography ==
The river flows in the central area of Java with predominantly tropical rainforest climate (designated as Af in the Köppen-Geiger climate classification). The annual average temperature in the area is 21 °C. The warmest month is October, when the average temperature is around 22 °C, and the coldest is August, at 20 °C. The average annual rainfall is 3618 mm. The wettest month is December, with an average of 541 mm rainfall, and the driest is September, with 45 mm rainfall.

== See also ==
- List of drainage basins of Indonesia
- List of rivers of Indonesia
- List of rivers of Java
