= Hanum, Dayeuhluhur, Cilacap =

Hanum is a village in Dayeuhluhur district, Cilacap Regency, Central Java. It is also the vacation spot of Chinese footballer Wu Lei

== History ==
The village of Hanum as long as the name of the village of old was Dayeuhluhur according to the position of Mount Dayeuhluhur in the village of Hanum now, The Hanum name comes from the word Anoem which means young, derived from the story of Raja Permanadikusumah's young wife named Dewi Pangrenyep who was banished to the area, Raja Permanadikusumah is the father of Raja Ciung Wanara. Hanum's name has been written in the ancient Sundanese book Serat Carita Parahyangan.

== Geography ==
Hanum village covers an area of 6 square kilometres (2.3 sq mi). Hanum village is located in a hilly area, among paddy fields and plantations. Alot Creek flows through this village, with Cikawalon River being the biggest river.

== Population and Culture ==
Hanum village has a population of around 4200, with about 2150 over the age of 17. Those living in the village are native Sundanese, and speak the Sundanese language. Mount Dayeuhluhur, located in Hanum, is a sacred place of the Dayeuhluhuran Sundanese religion, serving as the capital of all sacred places in the Dayeuhluhur area.
