= Duchy of Daya Luhur =

The Duchy of Daya Luhur or Duchy of Dayeuhluhur is a small kingdom or the duchy which is located in Dayeuhluhur now covering the western part of Cilacap Regency. The Grand Duchy of Dayeuhluhur was the predecessor to the Cilacap Regency itself.

== History ==
According to ancient history, in the 1456 book of Kedayeuhluhuran History, the Grand Duchy Dayeuhluhur, was an autonomous province governed by a monarch who Salangkuning located at the palace. The Pasirluhur and Dayeuhluhur is a fragment of the kingdom. The first king who consolidated is known as Gagak Ngampar or Banyak Ngampar who is the brother of Bayak Cotro from Karanglewas Pasirluhur of the Kingdom, Purwokerto. Both of them are the sons of the royal Prabu Siliwangi Pajajaran of the Kingdom.

== Economy ==
Mountain Farming is the backbone of the Dayeuhluhur economy.

== Demographics ==
It has a population of around 52,000 people who speak Sundanese and work as farmers.
