= Mount Ketra =

Mountain in Indonesia

Mount Ketra is one of the mountains located in Datar, Dayeuhluhur district, Cilacap Regency, Indonesia.

Surrounded by settlements, Mount Ketra has long served as a 'circern', a landmark for identifying nearby human habitation. Before Lembur Ketra existed, the ancient Galuh community knew Mount Ketra as Mount Puntang. It is said that based on the story of Batu Nilu that those who want to take control of the Gunung Ketra or Daya Luhur region must be brave first "nangtungan" on this mountain. This mountain is an important place in the life of the Daya Luhur community. Therefore, the existence of Mount Ketra since ancient times is one of the places sacred by the Dayeuhluhur community.

Although not very tall, Mount Ketra stands out due to its distinct shape and location, especially in contrast to the surrounding Dayeuhluhur area.
