= The Forbidden Forest of the Upper Cibeet River =

The Forbidden Forest of The Upper Cibeet River is a sacred wooded area in an old tropical forest Dayeuhluhur, in the north Cilacap Regency of Central Java, Indonesia.

== Overview ==
Visitors must be accompanied by a key keeper, to ensure proper respect for Dayeuhluhurian culture. They claim the forest to be one of spirituality. The juru kunci, or key keeper is Ceceng Rusmana from the Cibeet River.

Similar to Ujung Kulon National Park, the forest hosts tropical and rare animals and trees, including many Rusa (genus), Javan leopard and monkeys. People in this area believe that the Javan tiger and banteng still live there. This forest also contains many species of wild orchid.

Many rivers have their headwaters in the region of the Upper Cibeet. Some drain to the north into the Java Sea like the Cipamali River, while others drain to the south in the Indian Ocean, like the Cibeet River, Cidayeuh River and Cikawalon River.

A common belief forbids speaking or asking about anything seen in the forest. Another holds that spitting while in the forest will cause leeches to attack due to showing disrespect.

Terrestrial leeches are common in the forest.
