= Liem Lan Djin =

Liem Lan Djin also known as Kembang Sembodja and Lan Hoa was a Chinese-Indonesian writer born in 1910, and educated in a small village of Central Java.

== Life and career ==
Liem Lan Djin went to T.H.H.K. (Tiong Hoa Hwee Koan) school of Cilacap for a short time. She said that in around 1925 it was difficult for a girl to publish articles in the press signed with her real name. She also added "if someone happened to know that a girl was doing so, she was then regarded as red and everybody gossiped about her". Nevertheless, Liem used to write poems and short essays in various papers using different pen names such as Lan Hoa or "Orchid", Kembang Sembodja or "Fragipanni Flower". She also said that at 15, in order to escape the narrowness of her daily life while helping her mother to run a shop, and to ease her suffering, she started contributing writings in which she related her own experiences. In return she received several magazines, and also got in touch with contemporaries with whom she shared common views, especially other women writers like The Tiang Ek and Hong Le Hoa. She also was befriended by a writer named Ong Ping Lok (1903-1978), with whom she was married in 1930 and bore ten children. Her family life put an end to her literary activities.
