= Saka Tunggal Mosque =

Mosque in Banyumas, Central Java, Indonesia

Coordinates: 7°28′25.94″S 109°3′20.47″E

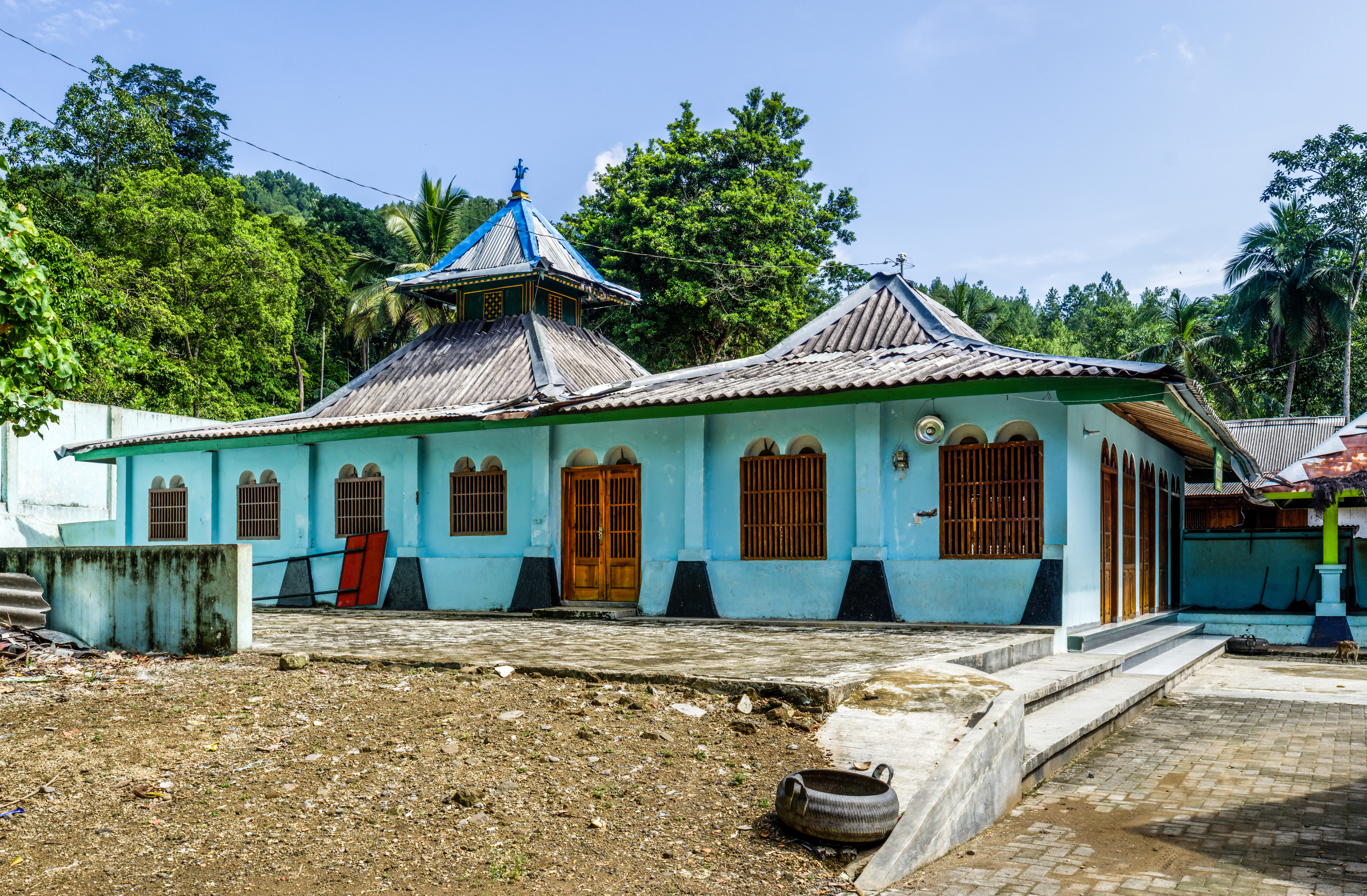

Religion
- Affiliation: Islam
- Branch/tradition: Aboge Islam

Location
- Location: Cikakak, Banyumas, Central Java

Architecture
- Type: Mosque
- Date established: 1871

Saka Tunggal Mosque (formally Saka Tunggal Baitussalam Mosque) is a mosque located in Cikakak, Banyumas, Central Java. Established in 1871, it is considered a Cultural Property of Indonesia. The area surrounding the mosque is home to thousands of monkeys.

== History ==
Saka Tunggal Mosque was established in 1871 CE, or 1288 hijri; the latter year is inscribed on the lone pillar in the mosque. The name of the mosque is derived from this column: saka tunggal, which translates as "lone pillar". The roof of the central room is made of palm tree fibres.

The mosque is held to have been established by Kyai Tulih (also spelled Ki Ageng Tolih), a pioneer of the Aboge school of Islam which combined the Islamic and Javanese calendars. The site remains sacred to followers of Aboge Islam, Saka Tunggal Mosque is often used for Eid prayers by the Aboge in Banyumas.

In 2004 the mosque was designated a Cultural Property of Indonesia. It is open to tourists, but under-utilized and poorly managed. Little infrastructure has been developed to support the development of the mosque and its surrounding area as a tourist object. As such, in 2014 only 2,000 visitors were recorded.

== Description ==
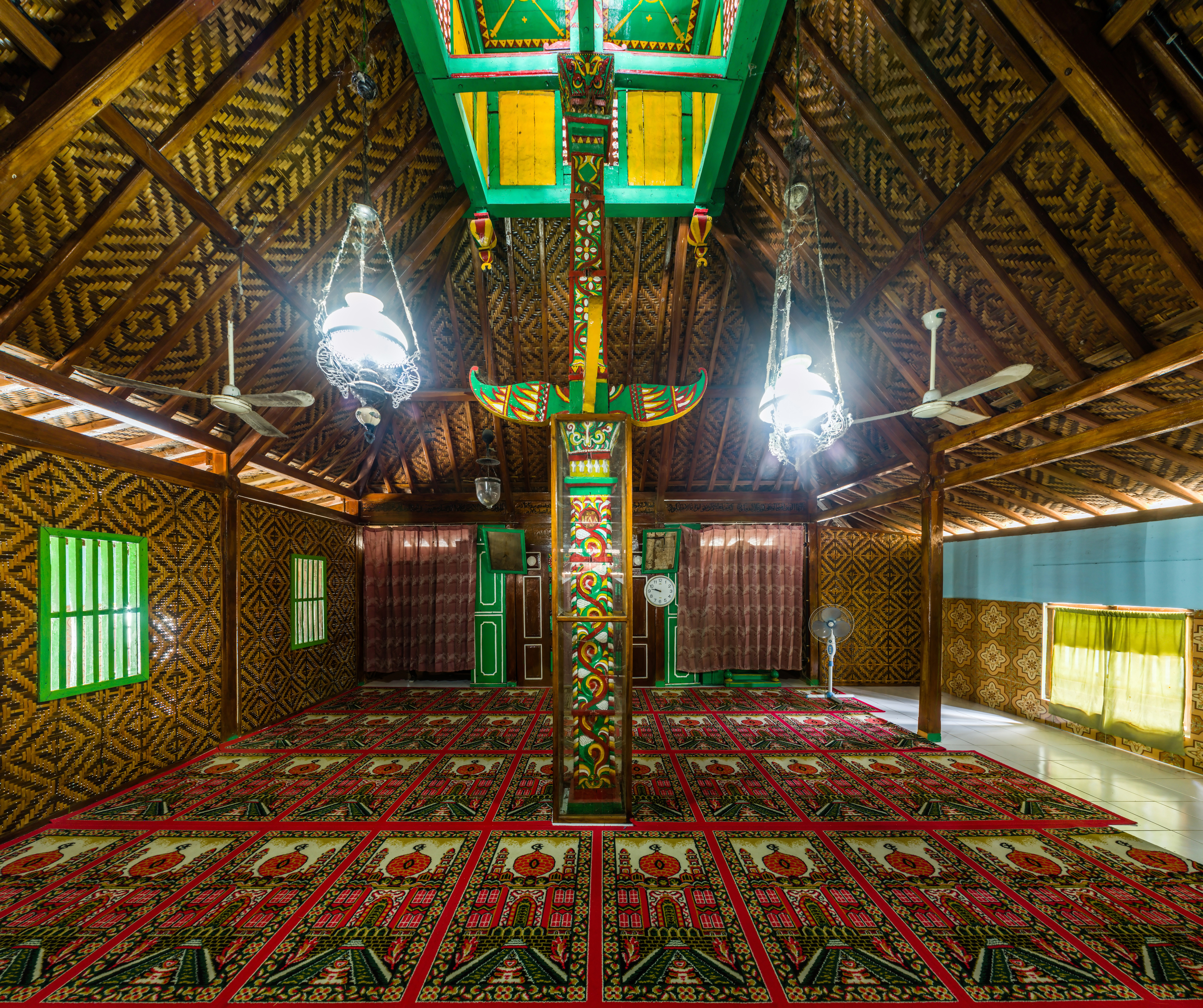
Interior of the mosque, showing the lone column for which it is named.

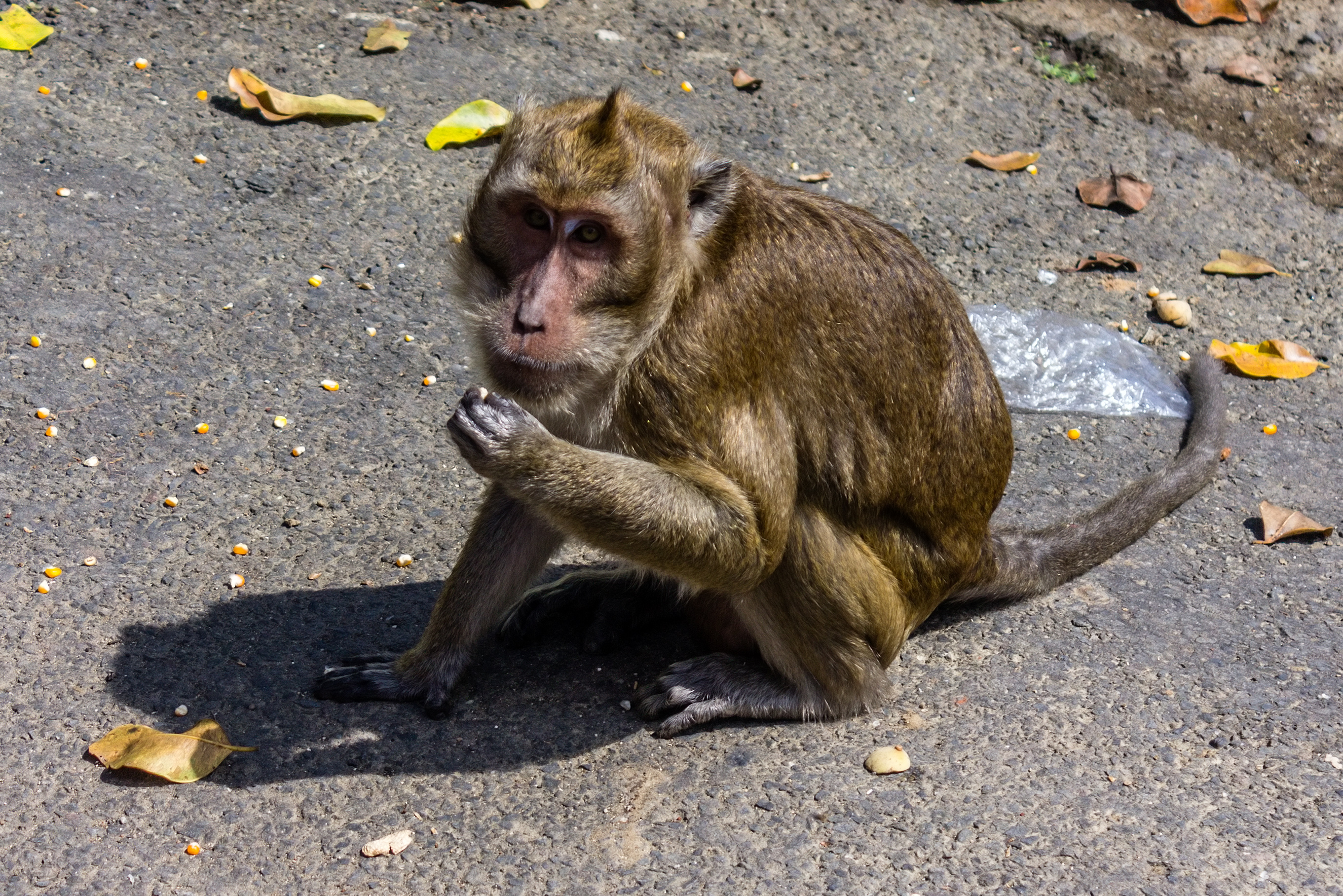
One of the monkeys on the mosque grounds

Saka Tunggal mosque is located in Cikakak, Wangon, Banyumas, Central Java, approximately 30 kilometres (19 mi) southwest of the regency's capital Purwokerto. It is about 2 kilometres (1.2 mi) from the main road, over a paved road which, as of November 2014, is badly damaged. The site lacks public toilets or other facilities for tourists.

Near the mosque is a graveyard where Kyai Tulih is buried. This graveyard is surrounded by a 300-metre (980 ft) bamboo fence and divided into three parts: the upper, middle, and lower cemetery. Each part of the cemetery has its juru kunci (caretaker).

Every year on the 26th day of Rajab, the bamboo fence (jaro in Javanese) surrounding the cemetery is replaced in a ceremony known as Jaro Rohab. Men replace the fence, beginning near the grave of Kyai Tulih and then continuing in the direction of the mosque. Meanwhile, women prepare food for a ritual known as slametan; the ceremony is done by the cemetery's three juru kunci. The Jaro Rojab ritual is intended to commemorate the Night Journey of Muhammad and to spiritually cleanse the participants. It attracts Muslims from much of Central and West Java, including representatives of the Surakarta Sunanate in Surakarta.

The area around the mosque is home to thousands of monkeys. These monkeys often come to the mosque area, though they are not supposed to be fed by tourists. The monkeys are considered sacred by the local residents, and thus may not be killed or injured. During the dry season, they may attack residents' homes, stealing food or other objects.

== See also ==
- Mosques in Indonesia

== Works cited ==
- Abdulrahman, Robin (17 November 2014). "Minim Fasilitas, Objek Wisata Masjid Saka Tunggal Sepi Pengunjung" [Minimal Facilities, the Tourist Attraction of Saka Tunggal Mosque Lacks Visitors] (in Indonesian). Radio Republik Indonesia. Archived from the original on 2 April 2015.
- Andrianto, Aris (16 September 2012). "Kemarau, Monyet Serbu Rumah untuk Menggasak Makanan" [Dry Season, Monkeys Attack Homes to Take Food]. Tempo (in Indonesian). Archived from the original on 2 April 2015.
- Banyumas Regency (brochure) (in Indonesian), Ministry of Youth, Sports, Culture, and Tourism, 2014
- Susanto (30 May 2014). "Tradisi Jaro Rojab, Cara Pengikut Aboge Peringati Isra Mi'raj" [The Jaro Rojab Tradition: How Aboge Followers Commemorate the Isra and Mi'raj]. Suara Merdeka (in Indonesian). Archived from the original on 24 September 2015.
- Zaenal M, Achmad (20 August 2012). "Komunitas Islam Aboge Baru Salat Id Hari Ini" [The Aboge Muslim Community are Just Doing Eid Prayers Today]. Antara (in Indonesian). Archived from the original on 2 April 2015.
