= Karang Bolong Beach (Nusa Kambangan) =

Beach in Central Java, Indonesia

Coordinates: 7°45′37.3″S 109°2′31.06″E

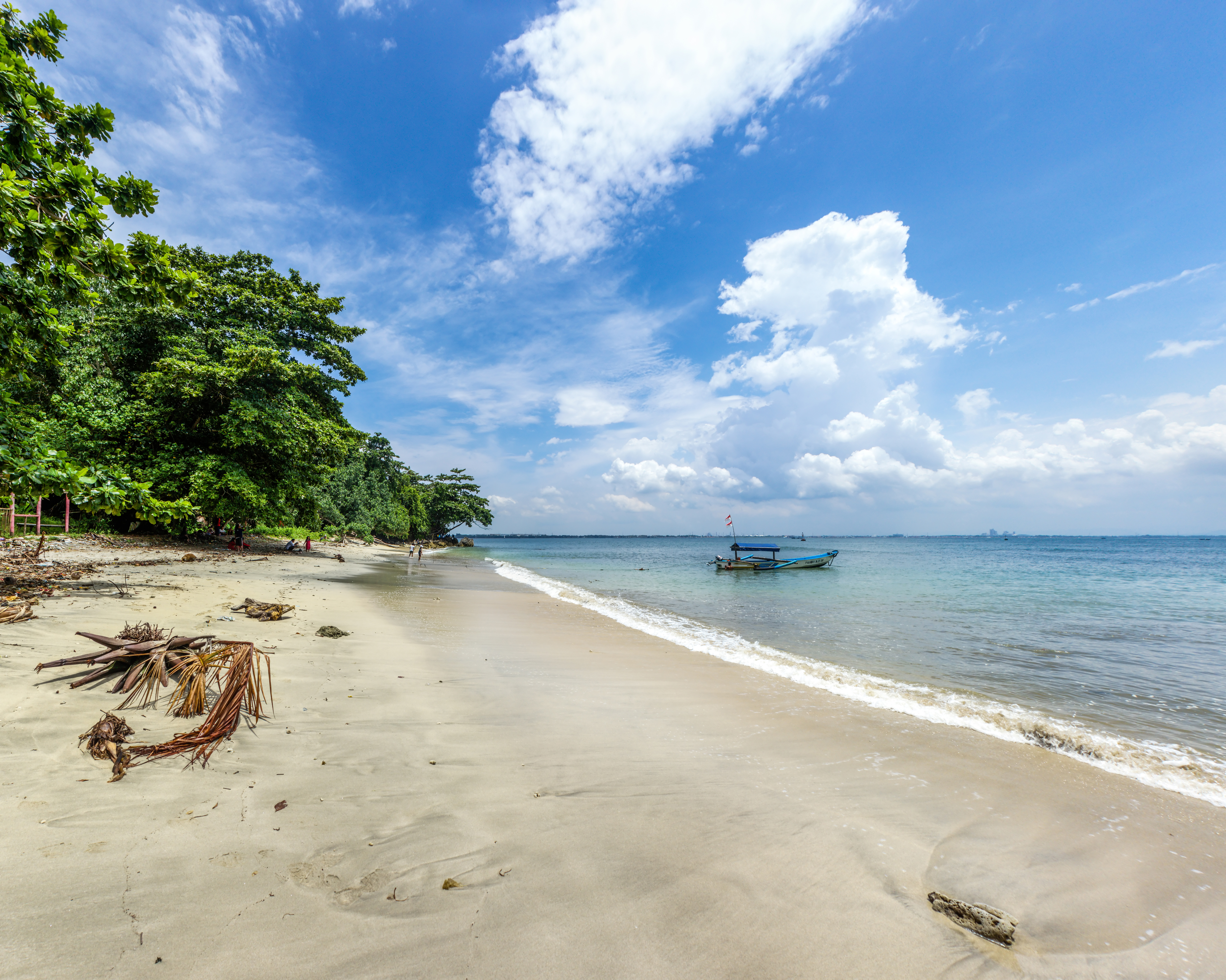
The west end of the beach

Karang Bolong Beach (Indonesian for "Holed Coral") is a white-sand beach on the island of Nusa Kambangan in Cilacap Regency, Central Java. Located on the eastern end of the island inside a nature reserve, the beach is situated near an old Dutch fortress, also known as Karang Bolong.

== Location and access ==
Karang Bolong Beach is located on Nusa Kambangan Island, which is administratively part of Cilacap Regency, Central Java.

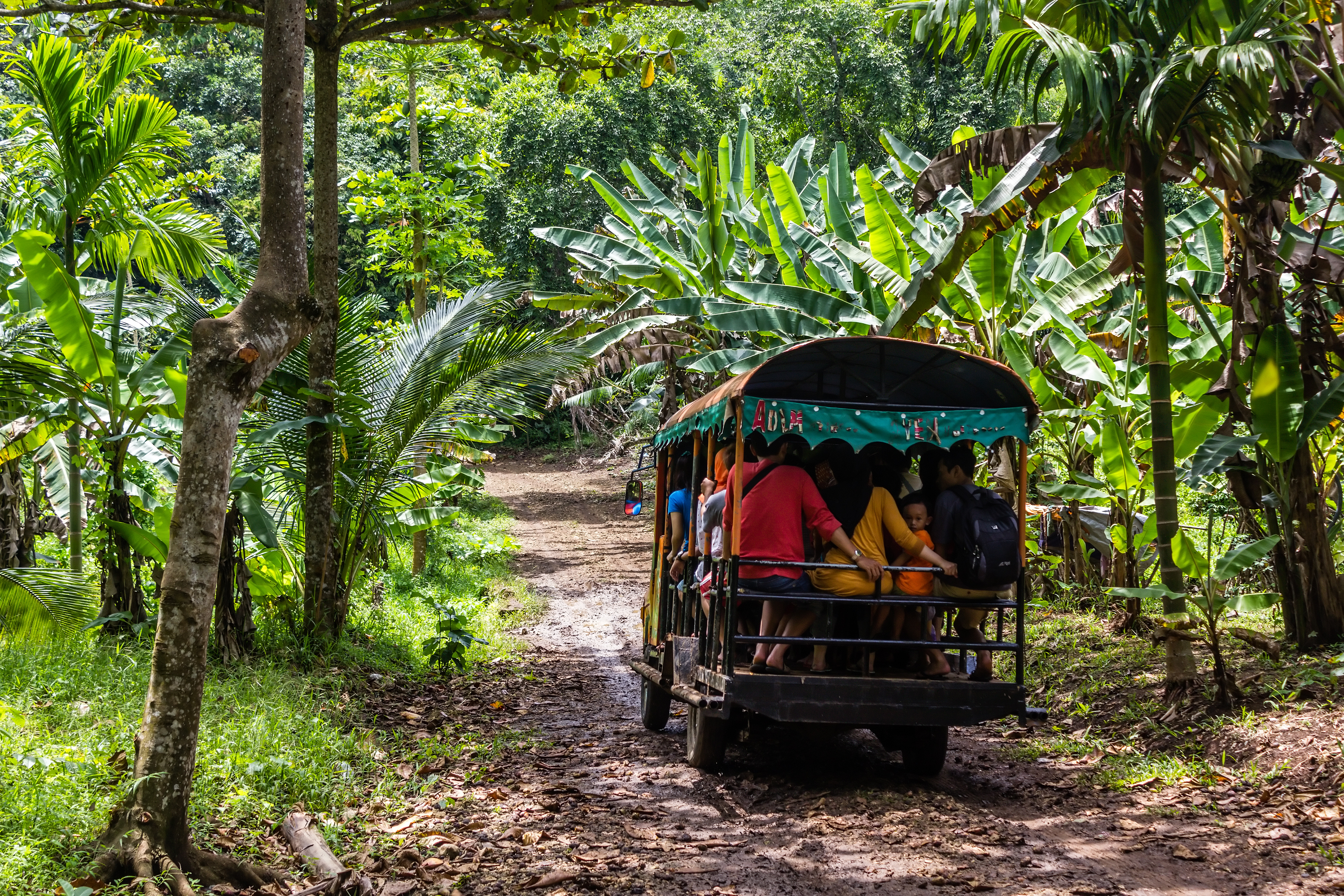
The transport to Karang Bolong Beach from the dock; the trip is completed over a dirt path through the forest.

To access Karang Bolong Beach, visitors must rent a boat from Teluk Penyu Beach, south of the city of Cilacap, and cross the Segara Anakan Strait to arrive at a small dock (the Karang Bolong Dock) on the north-eastern part of the island. From there, visitors can take a 1-kilometre (0.62 mi) trek along a dirt path through the forest; a transport is also available. Near the Karang Bolong fortress, the path splits in two. A left turn, to the north, leads to the western edge of the beach, a small stretch of land on the north of the island. Continuing straight, through the Fortress, leads to the larger stretch, on the eastern edge of the island.

The island of Nusa Kambangan is a nature reserve though people have begun to take up residence near Karang Bolong to cater to visitors.

== Facilities ==
On the path between the western and eastern portions of the beach is a fortress, known as Karang Bolong. This fortress was built by the Dutch colonial forces in about 1873, and was given its Indonesian name for its location close to the beach. The fortress, which covers 12,000 square metres (130,000 sq ft), has been damaged by exposure to elements, and is covered in vegetation. Many of its artefacts have been stolen, though cannons can still be found.

Near the western edge of the beach is a waterfall, known as Grojogan Sewu. It is so named because it consists of a thousand short drops.

No lodgings are available at the beach; visitors must return to Cilacap for accommodations.

== History ==
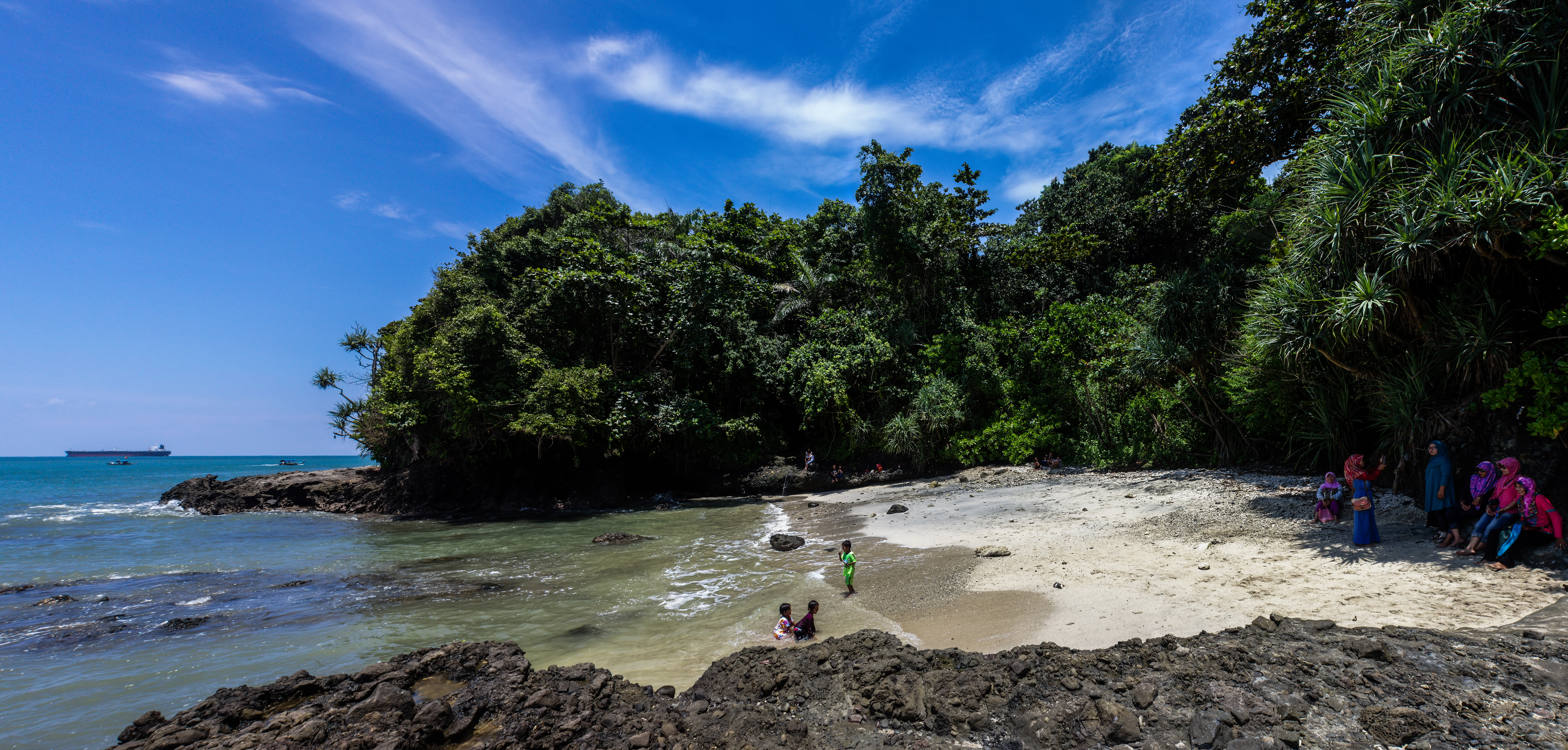
The south end of the beach

The island of Nusa Kambangan was first used as a prison during the Dutch colonial period. In 1905 it was declared a restricted area and closed to the public. The island remained restricted, under the Dutch colonial and, later, the independent Indonesian government, until 1996, when the governor of Central Java and the Minister of Law signed a memorandum which opened the eastern end of the island to the public. This included many beaches, such as Karang Bolong.

Several journalists have written that Karang Bolong, as with much of the natural beauty of Nusa Kambangan, is overshadowed by the well-known prison located on the island. Ujang Sarwono, writing for the Surabaya edition of Tribun, considers the relative lack of visitors to the beach to contribute to its pristine shape.

== Works cited ==
- Al Basyir, Heranof (8 March 2015). "Pelesir ke Benteng Karangbolong di Pulau Nusakambangan" [Holidaying at Karangbolong Fortress on Nusakamangan Island] (in Indonesian). MetroTV. Archived from the original on 25 June 2015.
- Anderson, Ricky; Royanto, Dwi (22 January 2015). "Keindahan Tersembunyi di Pulau Nusakambangan" [Hidden Beauty on Nusakambangan Island]. Viva News (in Indonesian). Archived from the original on 18 May 2015.
- "Keeksotisan Pantai Nusa Kambangan" [The Exotic Beaches of Nusa Kambangan]. Kompas (in Indonesian). 24 May 2013. Archived from the original on 4 March 2016.
- Mustholih (9 March 2015). "Mahalnya Berlayar Menuju Pulau Nusakambangan" [The Expense of Sailing to Nusakambangan]. OkeZone (in Indonesian). MNC. Archived from the original on 18 May 2015.
- Riadi, Yosef (11 March 2015). "Mengintip Dua Wajah Nusakambangan" [Looking at the Two Faces of Nusakambangan] (in Indonesian). BBC. Archived from the original on 28 April 2015.
- Sarwono, Ujang (28 April 2014). "Menjajaki Sisi Lain Pulau Penjahat" [Exploring Another Side of the Criminal Island]. Tribun (in Indonesian). Archived from the original on 30 April 2014.
