= Cimandaway =

Waterfall in Indonesia

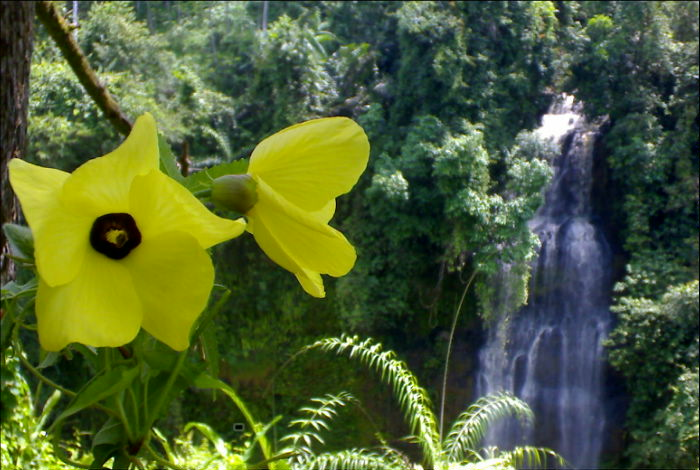
Cimandaway at Cikawalon River

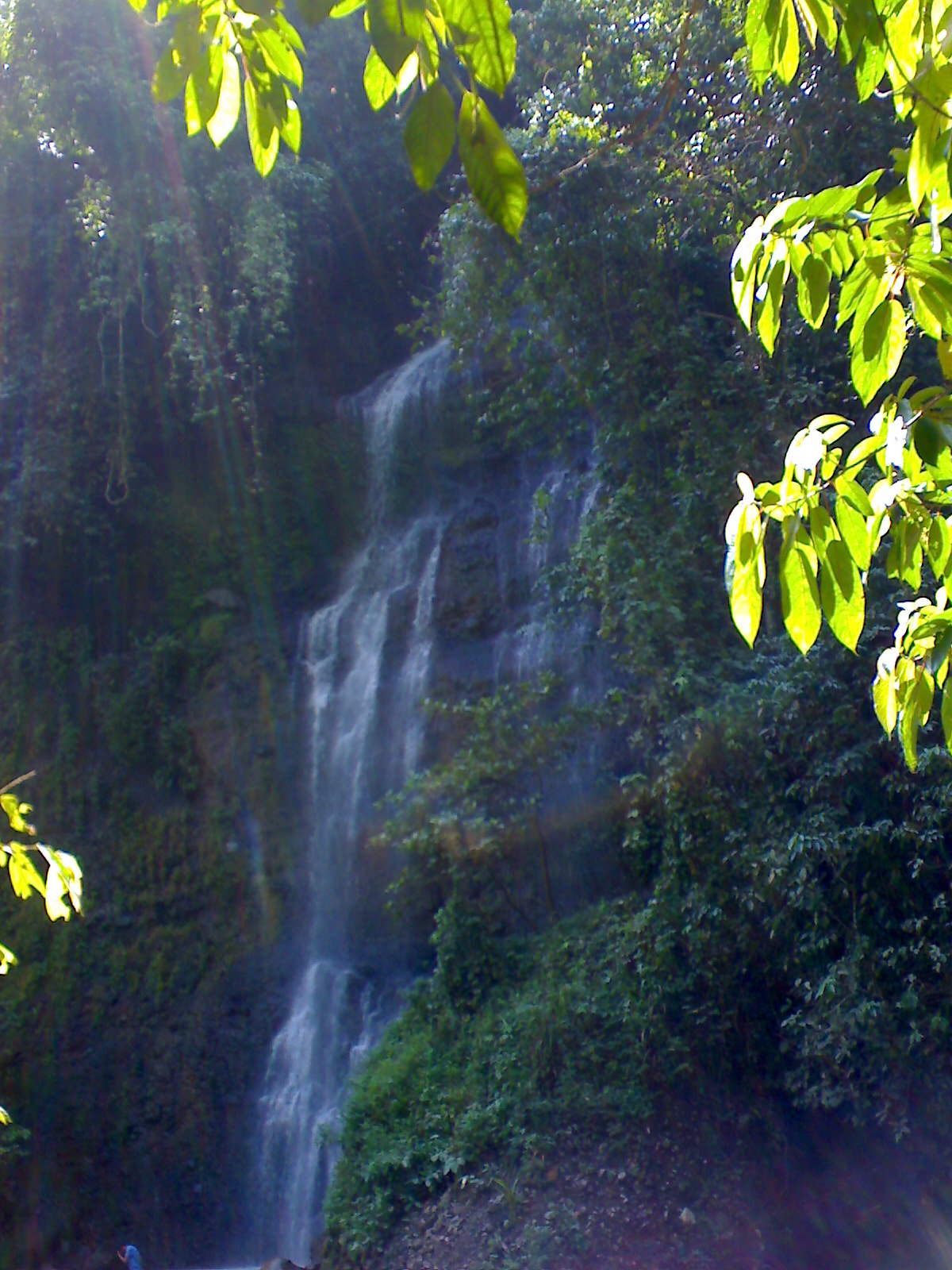
Cimandaway has a waterfall over 100 meters high.

Cimandaway or Curug Cimandaway is a waterfall on the Cikawalon River, at Datar village, Dayeuhluhur, Cilacap, Central Java, Java Island, Indonesia.
