= Teluk Penyu Beach =

Beach in Central Java, Indonesia

Coordinates: 7°44′32.15″S 109°1′16.31″E

Teluk Penyu Beach (Indonesian: Pantai Teluk Penyu, meaning "Sea Turtle Bay Beach") is a brown sand beach in Cilacap, Central Java. Named for its former sea turtle population, the beach is one of the most popular tourist attractions in the area.

== Description ==
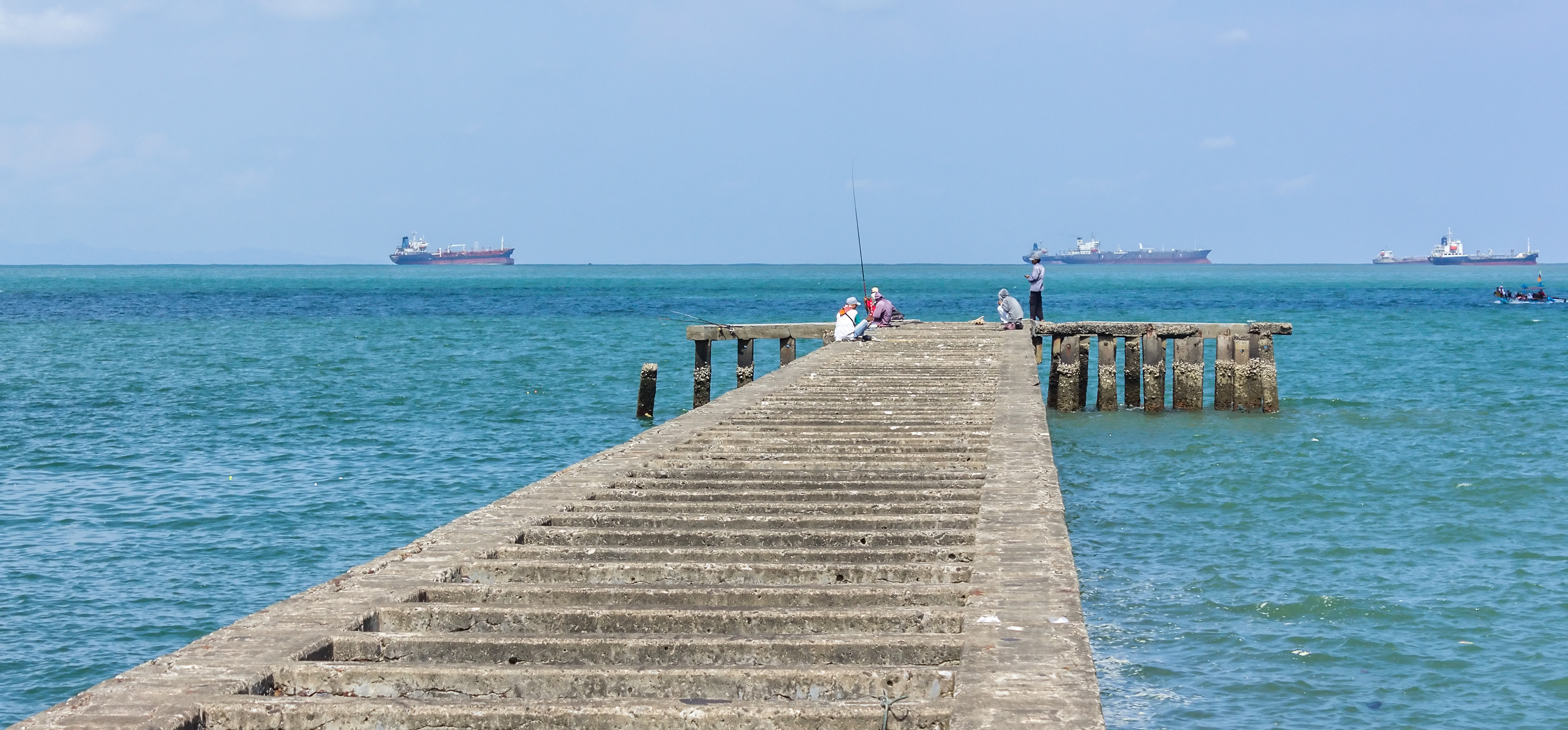
A pier at Teluk Penyu

Teluk Penyu is located about 2 kilometres (1.2 mi) east of the city center of Cilacap, the capital of Cilacap Regency. On the southern coast of Java, it faces the Indian Ocean. It is accessible by public and private transportation.

Along the brown sand beach are numerous restaurants, many serving grilled fish. Souvenirs and hotels are also available. Fishing is a popular pastime at the beach, which is crowded with local residents on the weekends. Boats are available for rent, as are water activities such as banana boats. Access to other tourist attractions is available through Teluk Penyu, including the abandoned fortress of Benteng Pendem, located on the west side of the beach, and the island of Nusa Kambangan, which is accessible through a short boat ride. On this island there are several further beaches, including Karang Bolong.

Every Satu Suro (the first day of the Javanese calendar) the local residents perform a ritual known as Sedekah Laut (Alms to the Sea) in order to thank God for protecting them while fishing. During this ritual, a procession leaves the office of the regent of Cilacap, heading to Teluk Penyu. At sea, water buffalo heads and other offerings are thrown into the sea by fishermen; according to local tradition, this must be completed by noon. Afterwards, cultural activities such as wayang (shadow puppet) shows, kuda lumping dances, and musical performances are held. In 2009, Sedekah Laut attracted 3,000 participants and another 5,000 spectators.

== History ==
Historically, Teluk Penyu was home to many sea turtles; this led to the beach receiving its current name, penyu meaning "sea turtle" in Indonesian. However, such turtles can no longer be found at the beach. This has been attributed to the shipping traffic which passes through the area after leaving the Cilacap port, as well as increased pressure from the tourism industry, which began to develop in the area in 1976.

The beach is used by many fisherman – 35,000 in 2009 – as a place for resting and launching their boats. Teluk Penyu is a major source of income for the region; in 2008, it and Benteng Pendem provided most of the regency's Rp 400 million in tourist revenue. However, development of the beach for tourism has been limited by the fact that much of the land is owned by the Indonesian Army.

== Views ==
Agus Maryono of The Jakarta Post described the views of the sea from Teluk Penyu as "undeniably beautiful".

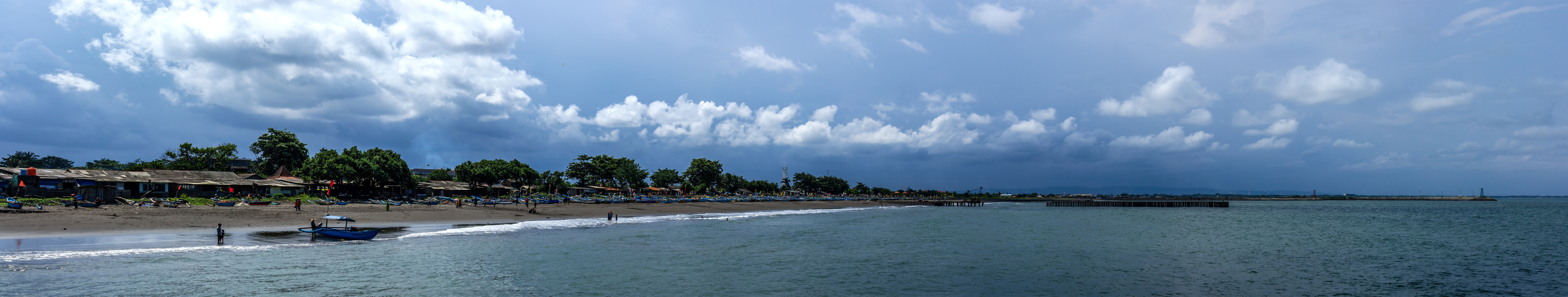
From the beach, looking north-east
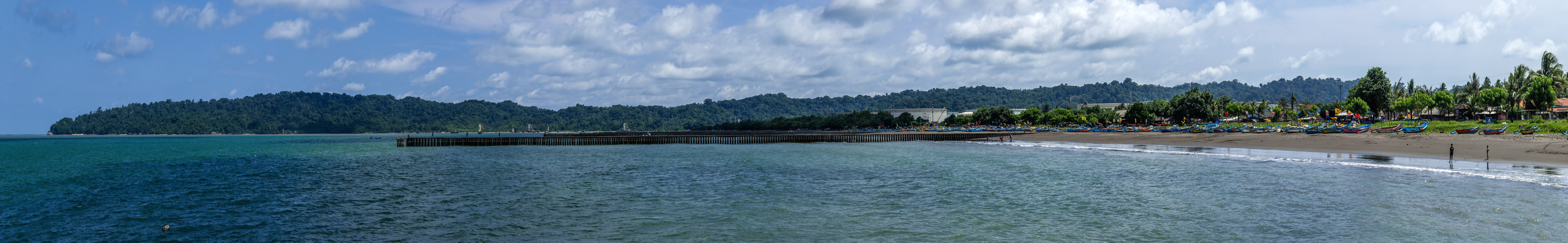
From the beach, looking south-east; Nusa Kambangan is visible in the distance

== Works cited ==
- Anderson, Ricky; Royanto, Dwi (22 January 2015). "Keindahan Tersembunyi di Pulau Nusakambangan" [Hidden Beauty on Nusakambangan Island]. Viva News (in Indonesian). Archived from the original on 18 May 2015.
- "Benteng Pendem Cilacap" (in Indonesian). Center for the Preservation of Cultural Properties, Central Java. 10 March 2014. Archived from the original on 13 February 2015.
- "Ini dia! 4 Pantai Cantik di kota Cilacap" [This is It! Four Beautiful Beaches in Cilacap] (PDF) (in Indonesian). Cilacap Regional Government. September 2014. Archived (PDF) from the original on 12 April 2015.
- Hernasari, Putri Rizqi (7 March 2012). "Yuk! Jalan-jalan ke Teluk Penyu di Cilacap" [Come On! Let's Go to Teluk Penyu in Cilacap]. Detik.com (in Indonesian). Archived from the original on 29 August 2014.
- Maryono, Agus (1 May 2009). "Turtle Bay offers everything but the turtles". The Jakarta Post. Archived from the original on 12 April 2015.
- "Potensi Wisata yang Terkendala Masalah Teritorial" [Tourism Potential Limited by Territorial Disputes]. Kompas (in Indonesian). 18 December 2009. Archived from the original on 4 March 2016.
- Sobirin, Mohamad (27 March 2004). "Tak Ada Tempat Bertelur, Penyu Hampir Punah" [No Place to Lay Eggs, Sea Turtles Almost Gone]. Suara Merdeka (in Indonesian). Archived from the original on 24 September 2015.
- "Teluk Penyu dan Benteng Pendem Andalan Cilacap" [Teluk Penyu and Benteng Pendem are the Mainstays of Cilacap]. Kompas (in Indonesian). 5 May 2009. Archived from the original on 4 March 2016.
