= Benteng Pendem =

Benteng Pendem ("Sunken Fortress") refers to several Indonesian fortifications:

- Benteng Pendem (Ngawi), in Ngawi, Indonesia
- Benteng Pendem (Cilacap), in Cilacap, Indonesia
