= Tunggul Wulung Airport =

Airport in Cilacap, Central Java, Indonesia

Tunggul Wulung Airport Bandar Udara Tunggul Wulung
- IATA: CXP; ICAO: WAHL

Summary
- Airport type: Public
- Operator: Indonesian government
- Serves: Cilacap, Central Java, Indonesia
- Location: Jl. Jeruk Legi, Cilacap
- Time zone: WIB (UTC+07:00)
- Elevation AMSL: 69 ft / 21 m
- Coordinates: 07°38′42″S 109°02′03″E

Map
- Location of airport in Java

Runways
Direction	Length		Surface
Direction	ft	m	Surface
13/31	4,593	1,400	Asphalt

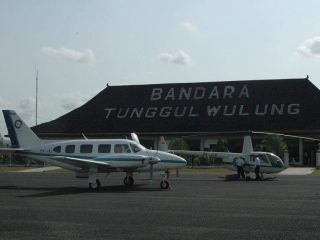
The Tunggul Wulung Airport terminal

Tunggul Wulung Airport (IATA: CXP, ICAO: WAHL) is an airport which currently serves the city of Cilacap in Central Java, Indonesia. The airport is constructed by Indonesian state-owned oil company Pertamina in 1974 and transferred to the Minister of Transportation in 1989.

The airport is located 9 km from the city downtown. There is a small terminal with the large airport name. The airport has one runway, with dimensions of 1,400 metres (4,593 ft) by 30 metres (98 ft) which allows the operation of aircraft up to ATR 72-600.

As of 2022, the airport didn't have fixed flight schedules.
