= Dayeuhluhur =

District in Cilacap Regency, Central Java, Indonesia

Coordinates: 7°13′48″S 108°37′18″E

Dayeuhluhur is a district within the Cilacap Regency of Central Java.

== History ==
Dayeuhluhur began as a Kadipaten or Duchy of Daya Luhur under Gagak Ngampar. Dayeuhluhur is place the popular Sondanese epic of Ciung Wanara in Cijolang River area.

=== As subdistrict ===
Dayeuhluhur District was established in 1979 and was formalized in 1980 based on Government Regulation of the Republic of Indonesia number 21 of 1979 date April 30, 1979.

== Economy ==
The economy of Dayeuhluhur is dominated by mountain farming.

== Demographics ==
Dayeuhluhur has a population of ~52,000 people, of which 96% are Sundanese and use the traditional Sundanese language. The majority of the inhabitants work as farmers.

== Geography ==
Dayeuhluhur is located on Mount Subang at the highest point within the Cilacap Regency. It is located in the tropical forest of the region, with the Cibeet, Cikawalon and Cidayeuh rivers running through it.

The district is home to 14 individual villages:

- Hanum
- Datar
- Panulisan
- Cijeruk
- Cilumping
- Bolang
- Kutaagung
- Bolang
- Dayeuhluhur
- Sumpinghayu
- Ciwalen
- West Panulisan
- East Panulisan
- Matenggeng

=== Points of attraction ===
Several sites sacred to the Dayeuhluhuran Sundanese religion are located in or near Dayeuhluhur, including

- Mount Ketra
- Mount Sembung
- Cibeet River
- Baledana Hill

Such places are traditionally under the care of a custodian called a juru kunci (key keeper).

Dayeuhluhur is also home to scenic attractions such as the Cimandaway waterfall and The Forbidden Forest of the Upper Cibeet River.

== Gallery ==
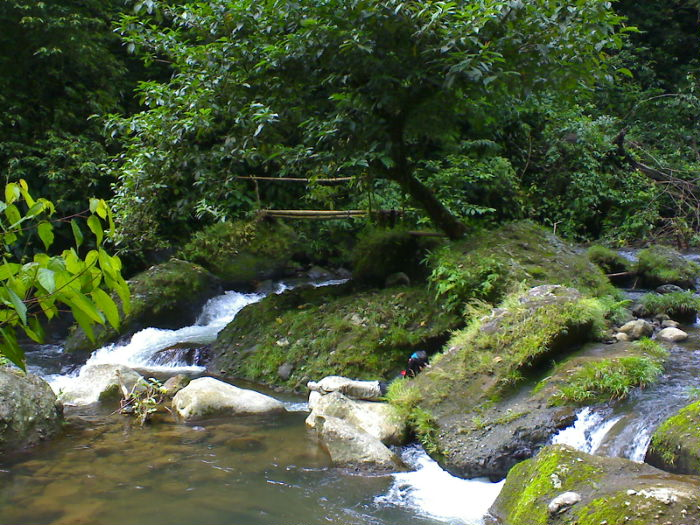
Tejakembang, on the Cibeet River
