= Cikawalon River =

Coordinates: 7.2187°S 108.5973°E

Cikawalon River Sungai Cikawalon, Ci Kawalon, Ci Kawolan, Tjikwalon
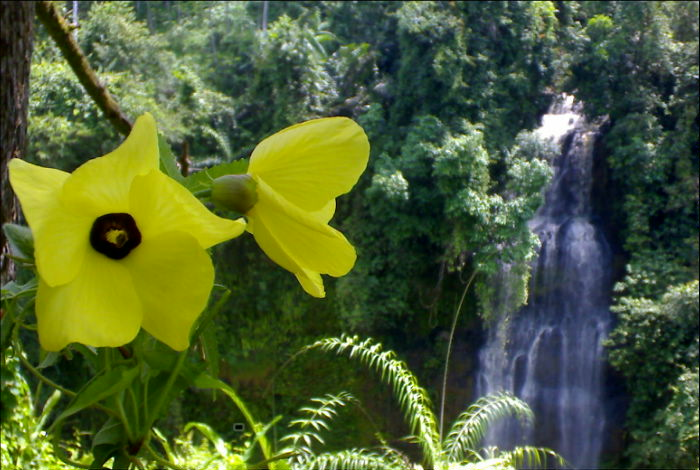
- Flowers at Cikawalon River

- Location of river mouth Cikawalon River (Indonesia)

Location
- Country: Indonesia
- Province: Central Java
- Regency: Cilacap

Physical characteristics
- Mouth: Cibeet River
  - elevation: 190 m (620 ft)

Cikawalon River is an important river at Dayeuhluhur, Cilacap Regency, Central Java in Java Island, Indonesia, about 220 km southeast of the capital Jakarta. It is a tributary river of the Cibeet River.

== Hydrology ==
The source of this river is at The Forbidden Forest of the Upper Cibeet River, near Mount Pojoktiga, and the river flows into Cibeet River.

== Tradition ==
Location Cikawalon river is at the upper of north Cilacap Regency but this river never has pure water because of farming activities. The Cikawalon River is a unique river, because it has a lot of sacred places.

Ngarumat Lembur ("caring for hometown"), at its fourth volume, was held in December 2012, took advantage of the moment of National Tree Planting Day every November to hold tree planting. Tree planting since 2010 has been carried out in seven villages, namely Datar, Hanum, Panulisan Barat, Panulisan Timur, Bingkeng, Ciwalen, and Cijeruk, targeting critical lands in the Cikawalon River, Singaraja, Cidayeuh, Cibeet and Cijolang which crosses Dayeuhluhur.

== Tourist attractions ==
"Curug Cimandaway" waterfall is a tourism place located on the Singaraja River which falls into the Cikawalon River. The road to the waterfall was repaired through the first volume of the Ngarumat Lembur program on March 16, 2010, so that the previous track was only stretched and could be entered by four-wheeled vehicles.

== Geography ==
The river flows in the central area of Java with a predominantly tropical rainforest climate (designated as Af in the Köppen-Geiger climate classification). The annual average temperature in the area is 21 °C. The warmest month is October, when the average temperature is around 22 °C, and the coldest is August, at 20 °C. The average annual rainfall is 3618 mm. The wettest month is December, with an average of 541 mm rainfall, and the driest is September, with 45 mm rainfall.

== See also ==
- List of drainage basins of Indonesia
- List of rivers of Indonesia
- List of rivers of Java
