= Juru kunci =

Custodians of cemeteries in Java, Indonesia

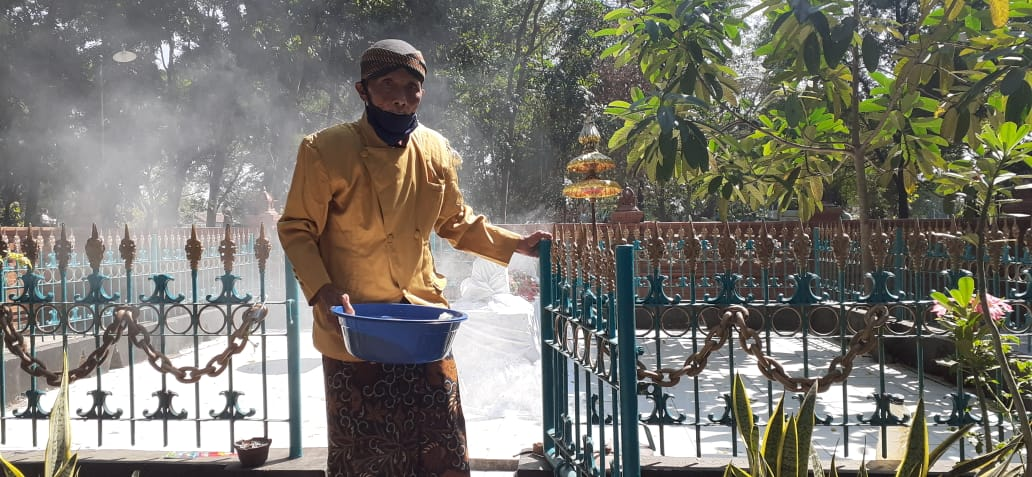
A juru kunci

Juru kunci are the custodians of graveyards and other sites considered sacred in Java, Indonesia. The name means "keepers of the keys" or "key master".

A notable exception from graveyards is the juru kunci who maintain a presence on the side of volcanoes such as Mbah Maridjan.

At many graveyards, they are also the performers of tahlil and enforcers of the protocol of ziarah at their respective graveyards.

When the graveyard has royal patronage (e.g. Yogyakarta or Surakartan) the juru kunci is given a name, status, and a very limited honorarium and is part of an extensive network of guardians over ancestral and sacred graves.

Exemplary examples of the juru kunci at their most significant are at Imogiri and Kota Gede. Here the two palaces share the responsibility over the relevant sections of the graveyard.

In West Java, a juru kunci is called kuncen.

Another popular juru kunci is the Juru Kunci of The Forbidden Forest of the Upper Cibeet River, Ceceng Rusmana or Ki Juru Kunci Girang Tampian. He protects the forest which is sacred and holy from exploitation because that forbidden forest is heritage from his forefather in Dayeuhluhur, Cilacap, Java.

The mission and philosophy of juru kunci is to lock all bad secrets and take care of all good things to make harmony between the community, tradition, and nature. Same with mandates from ancestors.

Among football fans, teams who stayed at the bottom rank are also jokingly called juru kunci. This refers to the habit of the juru kunci to stay very close to or actually in the site they are guarding, and rarely travel far from the site they are guarding due to their responsibilities.

== See also ==
- Javanese sacred places
