= Cidayeuh River =

Coordinates: 7.21405°S 108.60237°E

Cidayeuh River Sungai Cidayeuh, Ci Dayeuh, Tjidajeuh
- Location of river mouth Cidayeuh River (Indonesia)

Location
- Country: Indonesia
- Province: Central Java
- Regency: Cilacap

Physical characteristics
- Mouth: Cibeet River
  - elevation: 206 m (676 ft)

Cidayeuh River is a river in Dayeuhluhur, Cilacap, Central Java in Indonesia, about 220 km southeast of the capital Jakarta.

== Hydrology ==
River source is at The Forbidden Forest of the Upper Cibeet River, near Mount Pojoktiga, and the mouth of this river is at Cibeet River.

== Tradition ==
As with the Cibeet River, this is one of sacred rivers of the indigenous Sundanese population of Dayeuhluhur. The river Cidayeuh is coldest temperatures from all river at Cilacap regency. According to the mythology of the people of Dayeuhluhur, the Cidayeuh River is the "mother" for all water in this area.

Ngarumat Lembur ("caring for hometown"), at its fourth volume, was held in December 2012, took advantage of the moment of National Tree Planting Day every November to hold tree planting. Tree planting since 2010 has been carried out in seven villages, namely Datar, Hanum, Panulisan Barat, Panulisan Timur, Bingkeng, Ciwalen, and Cijeruk, targeting critical lands in the Cikawalon River, Singaraja, Cidayeuh, Cibeet and Cijolang which crosses Dayeuhluhur.

== Geography ==
The river flows in the central area of Java with predominantly tropical rainforest climate (designated as Af in the Köppen-Geiger climate classification). The annual average temperature in the area is 21 °C. The warmest month is October, when the average temperature is around 22 °C, and the coldest is August, at 20 °C. The average annual rainfall is 3618 mm. The wettest month is December, with an average of 541 mm rainfall, and the driest is September, with 45 mm rainfall.

== See also ==
- List of drainage basins of Indonesia
- List of rivers of Indonesia
- List of rivers of Java
