= Benteng Pendem (Cilacap) =

Coordinates: 7°44′57.14″S 109°1′1.51″E

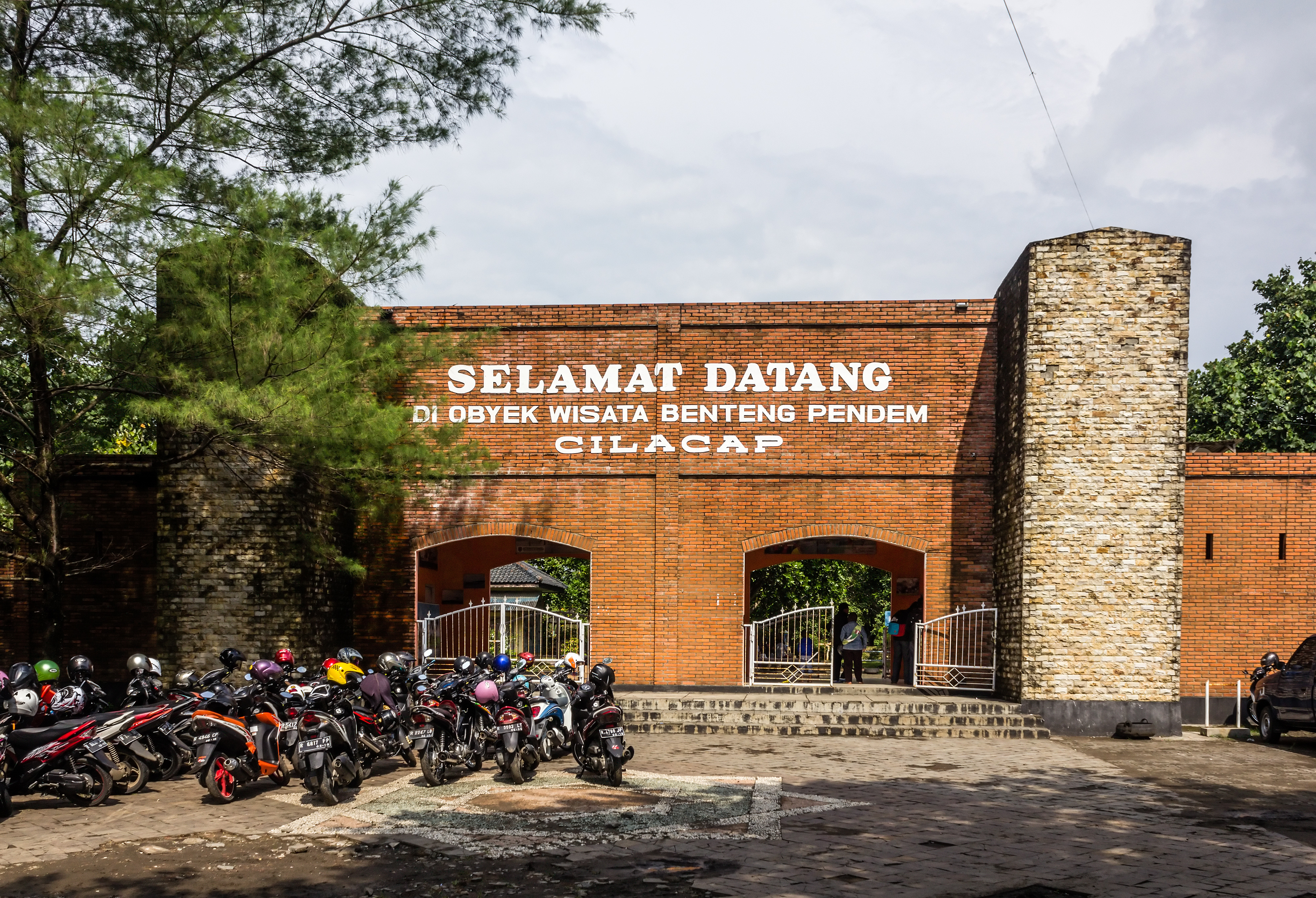
Entrance to Benteng Pendem

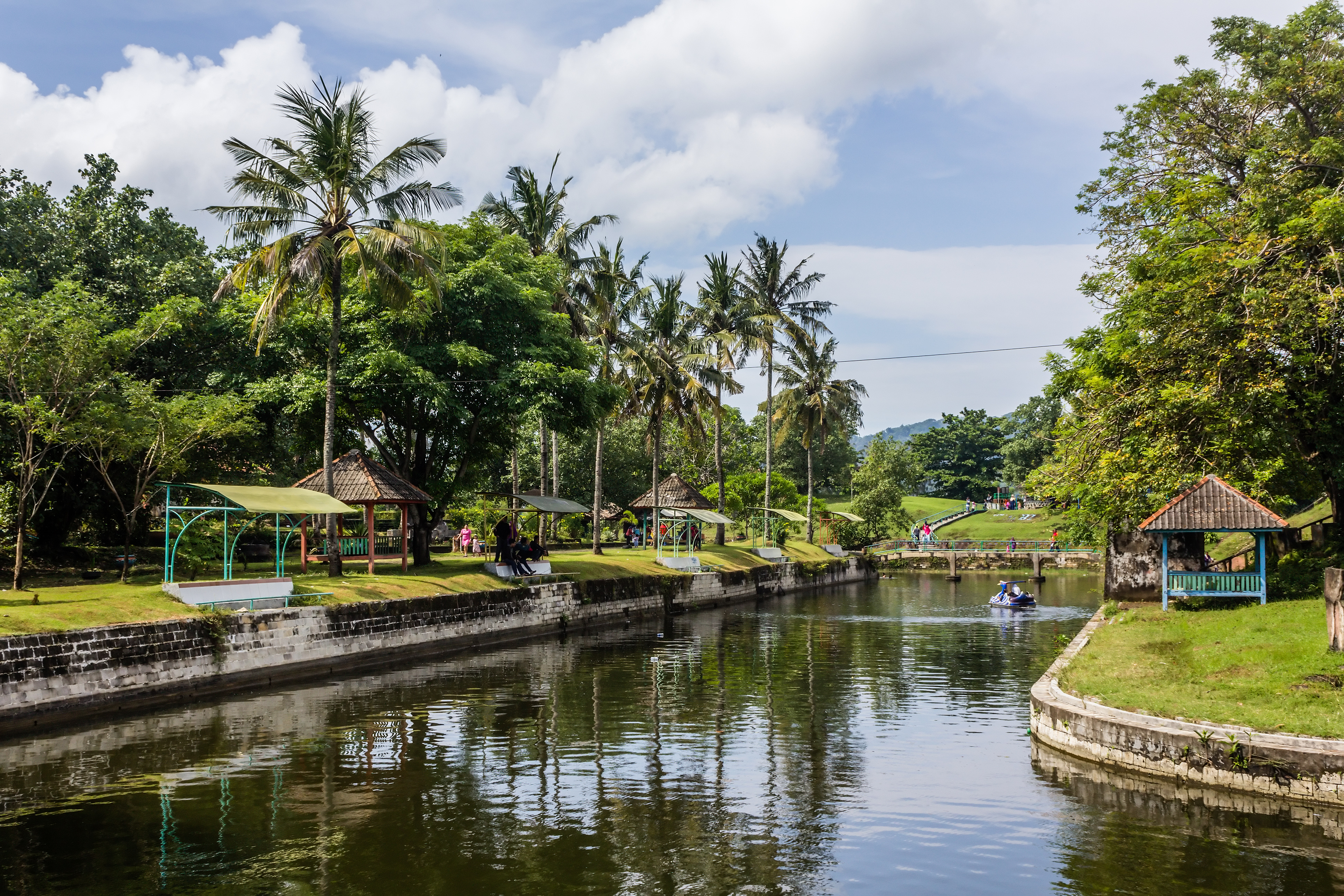
Water recreation area

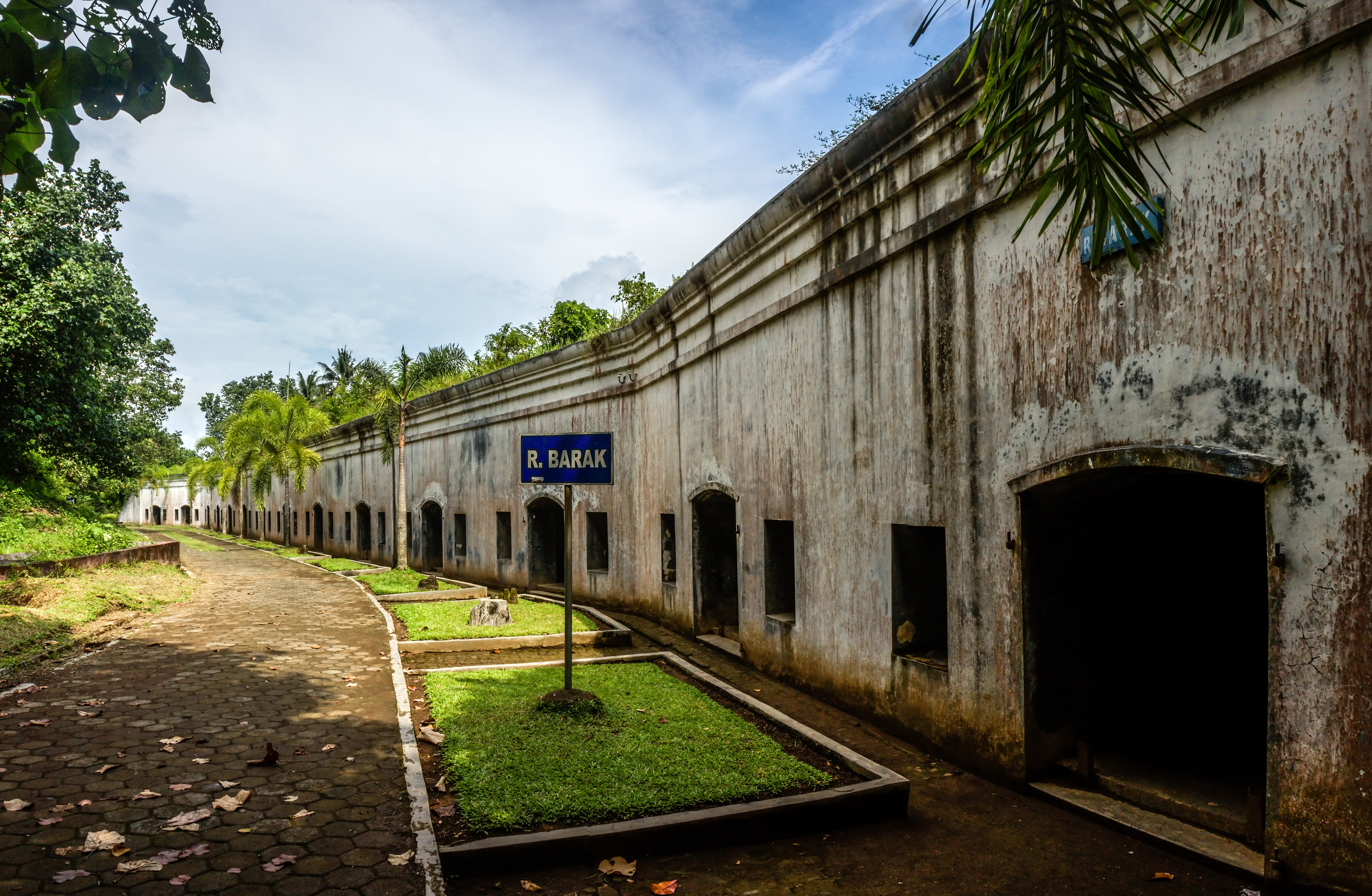
Barracks

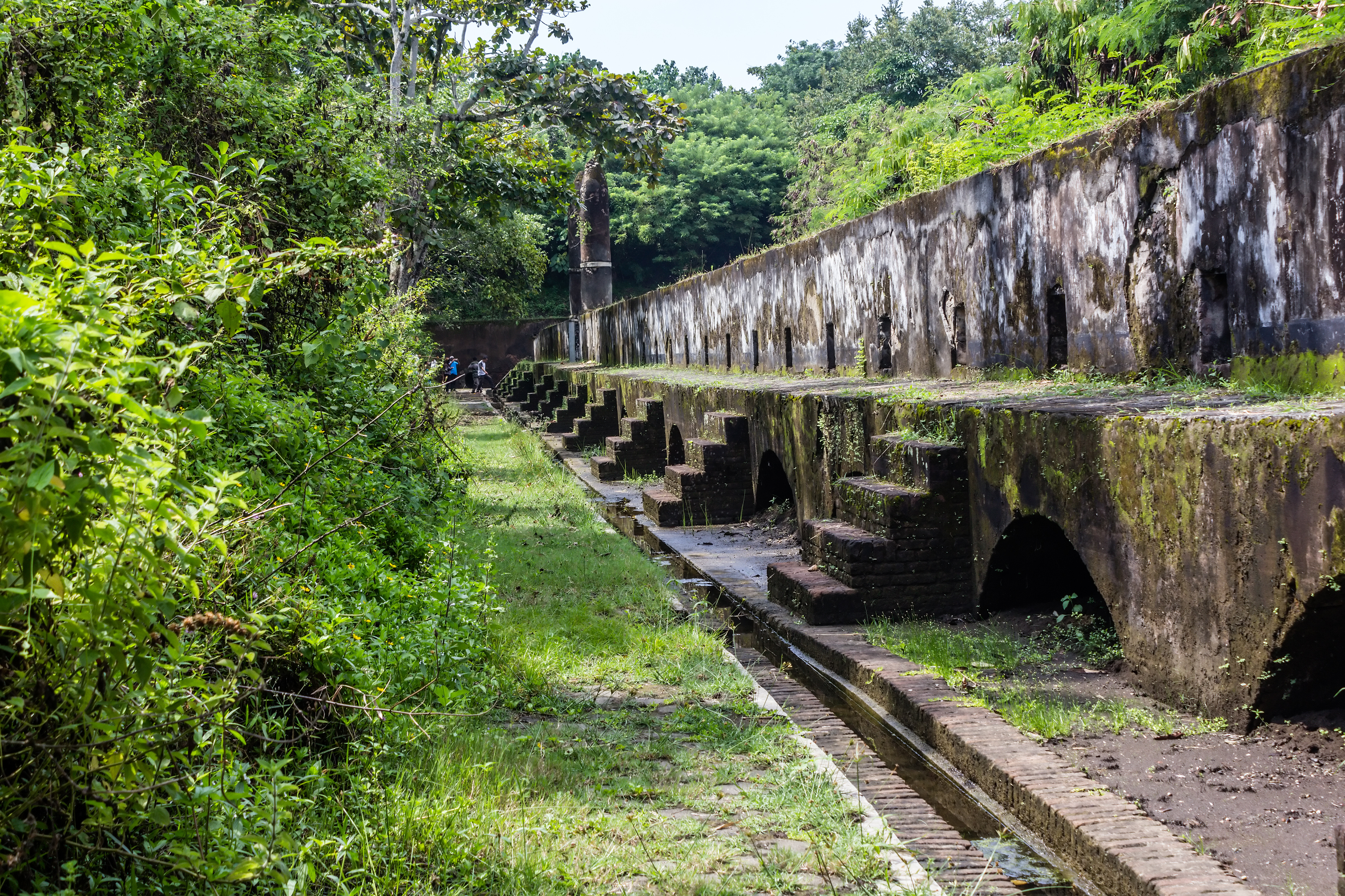
Fortifications

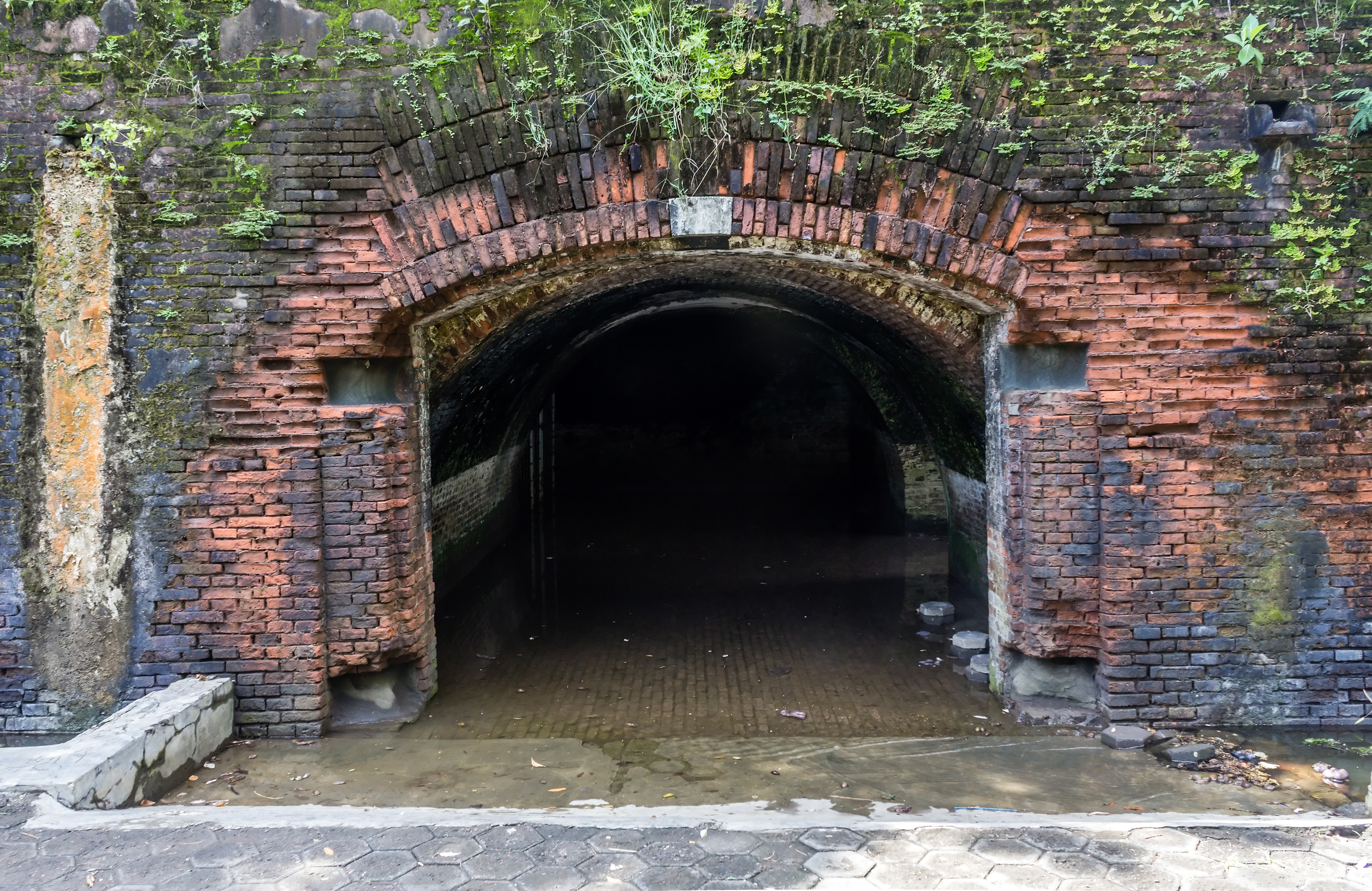
Entrance to the tunnel

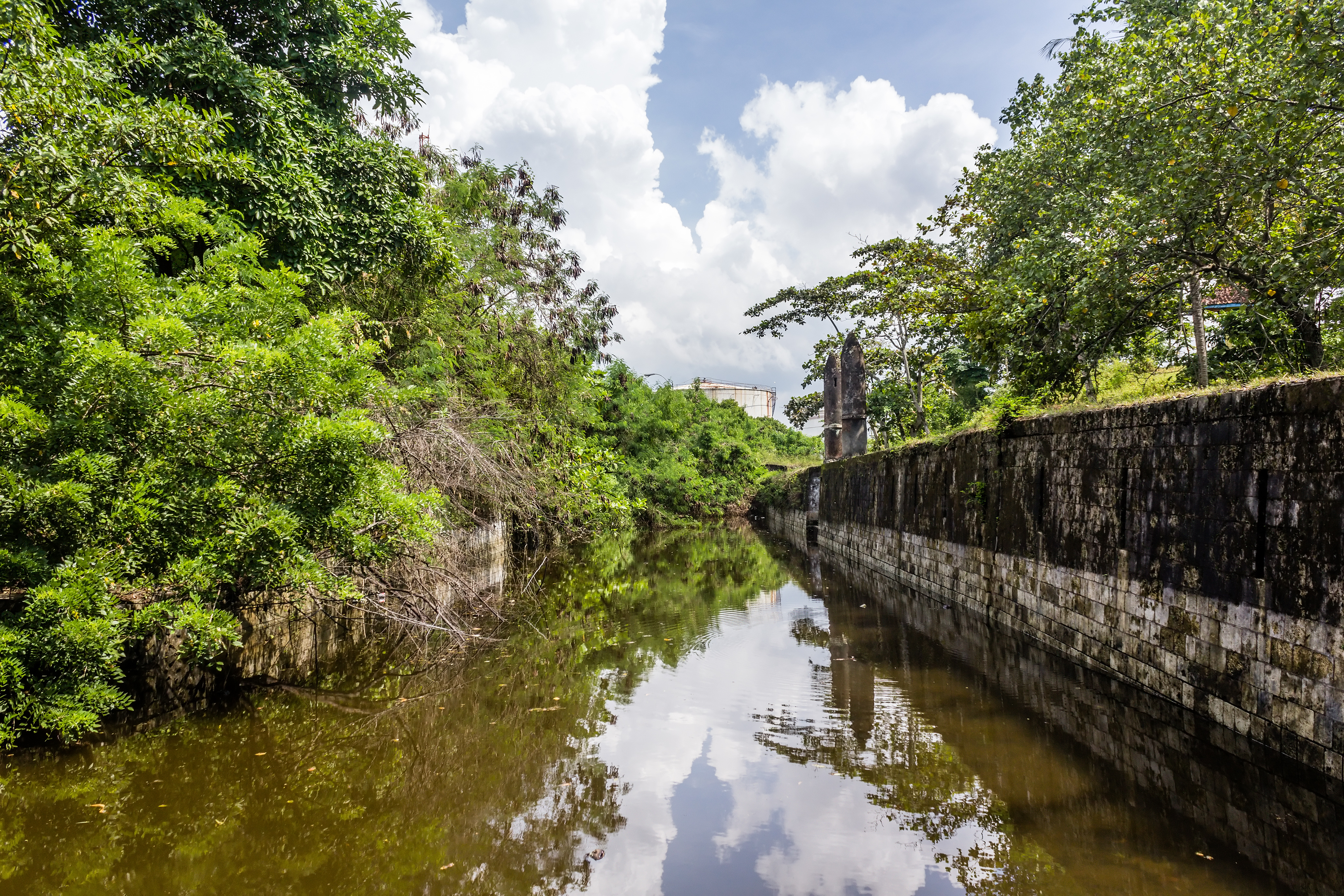
The moat

Benteng Pendem (Indonesian for "Buried Fort"; Dutch: Kustbatterij op de Landtong te Tjilatjap) is an abandoned Dutch polygonal fortress in Cilacap Regency, Central Java, which has become the region's main tourist attraction. Built between 1861 and 1879, the fortress originally served to defend the important port of Cilacap, though after a series of changes in ownership it fell into disrepair in the 1960s. In 1987 it was opened to the public.

The pentagon-shaped site covers 6.5 hectares (16 acres), and consists of both original buildings – including barracks, a clinic, and a prison – as well as several later additions. It is a Cultural Property of Indonesia.

== Description ==
Administratively, Benteng Pendem is located in Kebonjati Hamlet, Cilacap Regency, Central Java, southeast of the regional capital Cilacap and on the southern coast of Java. Behind the former fortress are oil storage facilities belonging to Pertamina, as well as a Dutch graveyard. To the east of the fortress is Teluk Penyu Beach, and across the bay is Nusa Kambangan Island. Busses to the fortress are available from the Cilacap bus terminal.

The pentagon-shaped Benteng Pendem covers a total of 10.5 hectares (26 acres), though 4 hectares (9.9 acres) have been used for the oil storage facilities. On site is an excavated moat, 500 metres (1,600 ft) long, 5 metres (16 ft) wide by 2–3 metres (6 ft 7 in – 9 ft 10 in) deep. Originally, the moat had been 10 metres (33 ft) deep and surrounded the fortifications. The tourist entrance on the eastern side of the fortress, built by the Cilacap government after opening it to the public, is located in what was originally the rear of the Benteng Pendem. Around the fortress there are 11 places where cannons were originally sited.

The fortress includes a prison, a two-story ammunition hold, a 113-metre (371 ft) long tunnel with four entrances, a barracks building with fourteen chambers, a clinic, and 330 metres (1,080 ft) of fortifications. These structures, constructed of brick which is covered in plaster, are located under 1–3 metres (3 ft 3 in – 9 ft 10 in) of dirt, giving the fortress its popular name; from a distance, the buildings resemble mounds. They are generally in poor condition owing to exposure to the elements, particularly sea water and moisture. All are in the same architectural style, and many more are thought to remain buried – including an undersea tunnel to Nusa Kambangan.

Since Benteng Pendem was opened to the public, amusements and other facilities have been constructed on-site, including swings, slides, and dinosaur statues. Guides to the fortress are available.

== History ==
According to the Babad Banyumas, Sunan of Surakarta Pakubuwono IV first built a fortress in the Cilacap area in the early 19th century; the Central Javan branch of the Center for the Preservation of Cultural Properties suggests that Benteng Pendem may have been built over this fort. Kustbatterij op de Landtong te Tjilatjap (Coastal Battery at the Peninsula of Cilacap), the fort which is now known as Benteng Pendem, began construction in 1861. At the time, the port of Cilacap was an important one for the transportation of goods from Yogyakarta and Purworejo, and thus defended well for its strategic importance; another fortification from this period can be found in Karang Bolong, Nusa Kembangan. The fortress began operations in 1879, and held numerous prisoners – both civilian and military – while occupied by the Dutch.

During the Japanese occupation of the Dutch East Indies from 1942 to 1945, Benteng Pendem was taken over by the Japanese occupation forces. After the occupation ended, returning Dutch forces asserted control of the building, holding it until the end of the Indonesian National Revolution in 1949. Between 1952 and 1965 the fortress belonged to the Indonesian Army, and was used by the Resimen Para Komando Angkatan Darat (Regiment of Army Commandos; now Kopassus) for training purposes between 1956 and 1962.

After 1965, Benteng Pendem was left unused, and fell into disrepair and was covered in sand. Around this time the Pertamina storage facilities were built, taking land which had belonged to the fortress. It was excavated in 1986, and, after a year of preparations, the fort was opened to tourists by the Cilacap regional government in 1987. In 2002 and 2005, dangerously dilapidated areas of the fortress were fenced off. By 2013 Benteng Pendem had become the area's prime tourist destination, as well as a Cultural Property of Indonesia.

Benteng Pendem is said to be haunted, and has often used been used as a filming location for tests of bravery; individuals are left alone, without lights, in a room for an hour.

== Works cited ==
- "Benteng Pendem Cilacap" (in Indonesian). Center for the Preservation of Cultural Properties, Central Java. 10 March 2014. Archived from the original on 13 February 2015.
- Finesso, Gregorius Magnus (28 May 2012). "Benteng Pendem Memendam Sejuta Keunikan" [Benteng Pendem Hides a Million Unique Things]. Kompas (in Indonesian). Archived from the original on 30 December 2014.
- Nurani, Nanang Anna (2012). "Benteng Pendem: Sejarah Perjuangan Rakyat Cilacap" [Benteng Pendem: History of the Struggle of the People of Cilacap] (in Indonesian). Indosiar. Archived from the original on 13 February 2015.
- Purbaya, Angling Adhitya (1 September 2014). "Misteri di Benteng Cilacap" [Mystery in the Fortress of Cilacap]. Detik.com (in Indonesian). Archived from the original on 21 March 2015.
- Wicaksono, Teguh (September 2013). "Dicekam Seram di Benteng Pendem" [Gripped by Fright in Benteng Pendem]. National Geographic Traveler (in Indonesian). Archived from the original on 7 April 2015.
