= Cilacap Regency =

Regency in Central Java, Indonesia

Cilacap Regency Kabupaten Cilacap
- Regency

Other transcription(s)
  - Javanese: ꦏꦨꦸꦥꦠꦺꦤ꧀ꦕꦶꦭꦕꦥ꧀
  - Sundanese: ᮊᮘᮥᮕᮒᮦᮔ᮪ ᮎᮤᮜᮎᮕ᮪
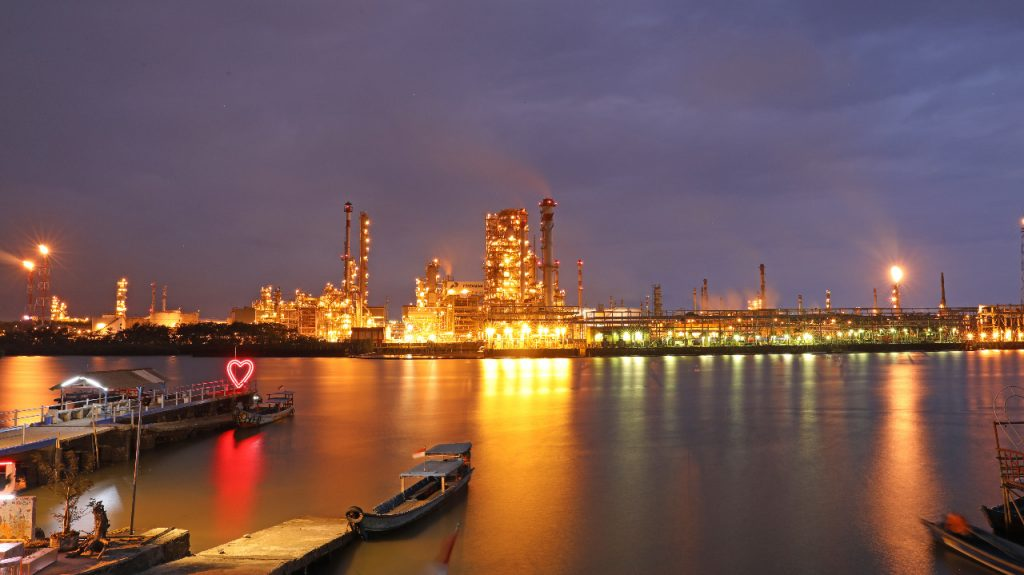
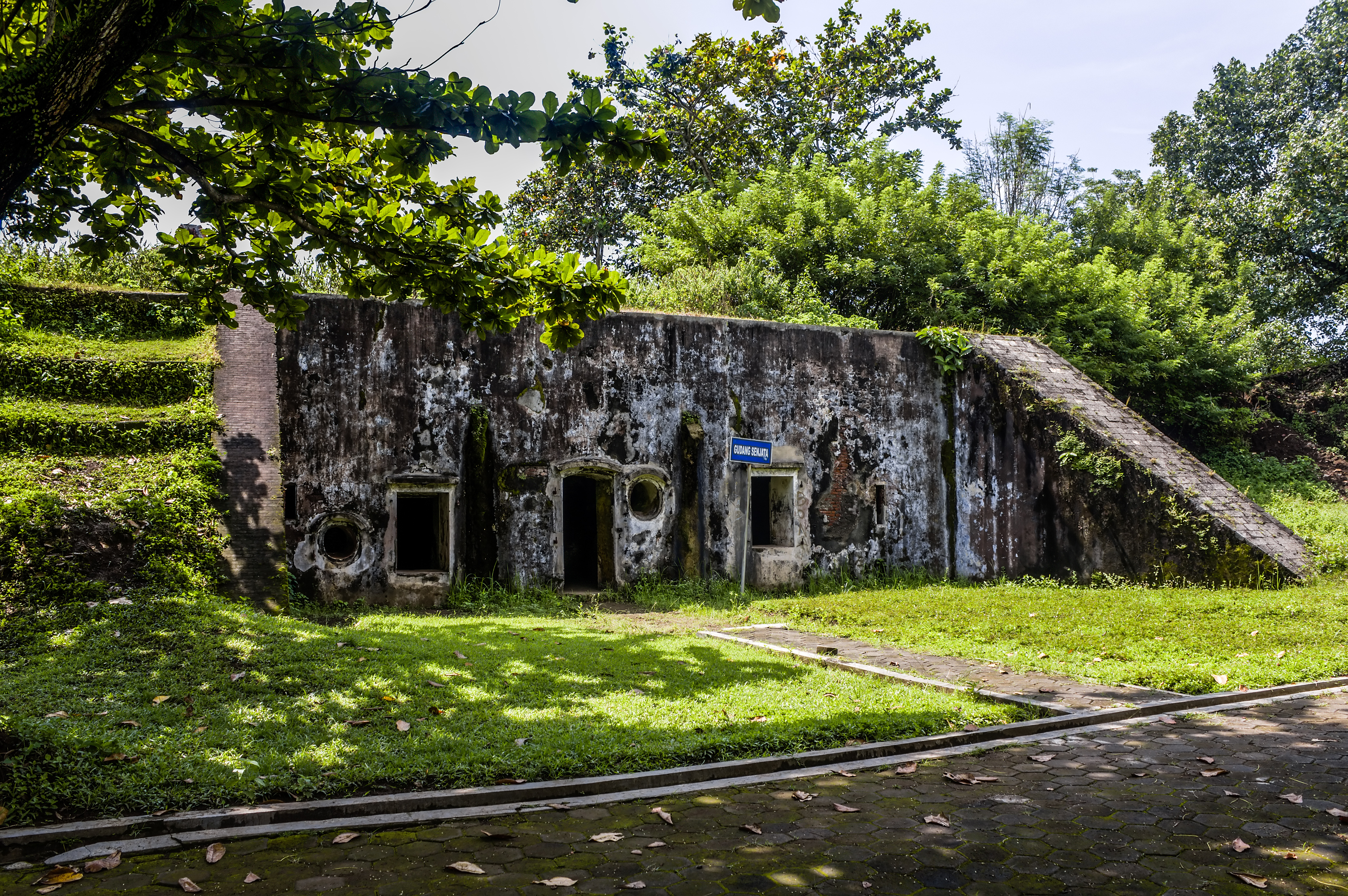
- top to bottom: Pertamina Refinery Unit in Cilacap viewed from Kutawaru; Benteng Pendem

- Coat of arms

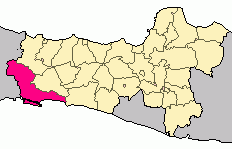
- Location within Central Java

- Location in Java and Indonesia Cilacap Regency (Indonesia)
- Coordinates: 7°44′S 109°0′E
- Country: Indonesia
- Province: Central Java
- Region: Java
- Settled: 20 April 1205
- Capital: Cilacap

Government
  - Regent: Syamsul Auliya Rachman
  - Vice Regent: Ammy Amalia Fatma Surya

Area
  - Total: 2,323.93 km^{2} (897.27 sq mi)

Population (mid 2025 estimate)
  - Total: 2,046,392
  - Density: 880.574/km^{2} (2,280.68/sq mi)
- Time zone: UTC+7 (IWST)
- Area code: (+62) 280/282
- Website: cilacapkab.go.id

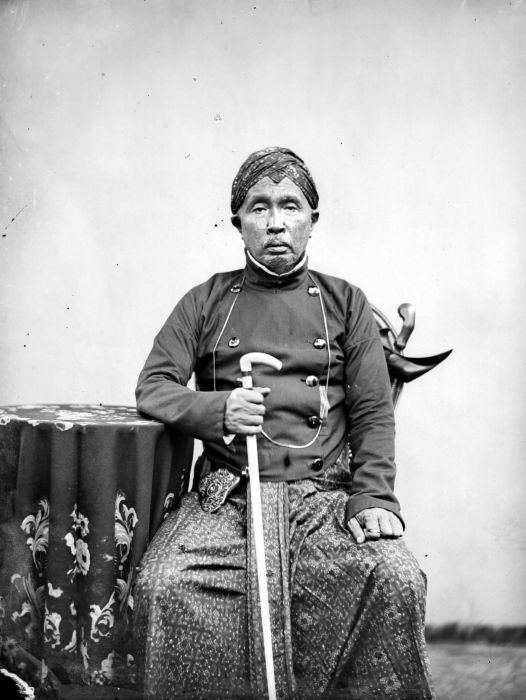
Regent of Tjilatjap

Cilacap Regency (Javanese: ꦏꦨꦸꦥꦠꦺꦤ꧀ꦕꦶꦭꦕꦥ꧀, also spelt: Chilachap, old spelling: Tjilatjap, Sundanese: ᮊᮘᮥᮕᮒᮦᮔ᮪ ᮎᮤᮜᮎᮕ᮪) is a regency (Indonesian: kabupaten) in the southwestern part of Central Java province in Indonesia. Its capital is the town of Cilacap, which had 264,360 inhabitants in mid 2025, spread over three administrative districts.

Cilacap Regency covers a land area of 2,323.93 km^{2} (including the 115-km^{2} Nusakambangan Island off the south coast), and it had a population of 1,642,107 at the 2010 Census and 1,944,857 at the 2020 Census; the official estimate as of mid 2025 was 2,046,392 (comprising 1,029,948 males and 1,016,444 females). The languages used in Cilacap are Javanese and Sundanese, although most people can speak Indonesian; the dialect of Javanese used is Banyumasan.

There are schools of all levels in Cilacap and several higher-learning institutions. Several academies exist, such as Akademi Maritim Nusantara (National Maritime Academy). A polytechnic, Politeknik Cilacap, was established in 2008 and offers Engineering, Electronics and Informatics education.

== Administrative districts ==
Cilacap Regency comprises twenty-four districts (kecamatan), tabulated below with their areas and their populations at the 2010 Census and the 2020 Census, together with the official estimates as of mid 2025. The table also includes the locations of the district administrative centres, the number of administrative villages in each district (comprising 269 rural desa and 15 urban kelurahan - the latter all in the 3 Cilacap town districts), and its postcode. The three districts comprising Cilacap town formerly formed an Autonomous city but have now been subsumed back into the regency.

kode Wilayah	Name of District (kecamatan)	Area in km^{2}	Pop'n Census 2010	Pop'n Census 2020	Pop'n Estimate mid 2025	Admin centre	No. of villages	Post code
33.01.16	Dayeuhluhur	182.53	46,470	49,095	49,860	Dayeuhluhur	14	53266
33.01.15	Wanareja	196.20	92,824	105,580	108,510	Wanareja	16	53265^{(a)}
33.01.14	Majenang	165.66	122,763	140,329	144,650	Jenang	17	53257
33.01.13	Cimanggu	158.89	89,301	102,001	106,020	Cimanggu	15	53256
33.01.12	Karangpucung	120.09	68,412	79,096	81,980	Karangpucung	14	53255
33.01.18	Cipari	101.47	53,717	66,084	79,580	Cipari	11	53262
33.01.11	Sidareja	52.33	52,270	61,940	64,970	Sidareja	10	53261
33.01.01	Kedungreja	82.63	71,796	87,935	93,720	Ciklapa	11	53263
33.01.19	Patimuan	78.44	42,716	49,484	51,340	Patimuan	7	53264
33.01.10	Gandrungmangu	118.45	88,562	108,851	116,210	Gandrungmangu	14	53254
33.01.20	Bantarsari	119.59	60,795	74,555	79,510	Bantarsari	8	53281
33.01.09	Kawunganten	120.54	69,799	84,354	89,330	Kawunganten	12	53251
33.01.24	Kampung Laut	125.44	12,666	15,523	16,550	Klaces	4	53253
33.01.08	Jeruklegi	102.75	59,152	76,658	83,970	Jeruklegi Wetan	13	53252
33.01.02	Kesugihan	87.51	107,385	133,261	142,940	Kesugihan Kidul	16	53274
33.01.03	Adipala	73.62	75,334	93,999	101,090	Adipala	16	53271
33.01.07	Maos	32.13	40,410	46,188	47,610	Klapagada	10	53272
33.01.17	Sampang	29.30	36,636	43,426	45,560	Sampang	10	53273
33.01.06	Kroya	60.97	95,307	114,431	120,790	Kroya	17	53282
33.01.04	Binangun	54.85	54,574	68,684	74,170	Binangun	17	53280
33.01.05	Nusawungu	62.90	68,094	85,787	92,690	Nusawungu	17	53283
33.01.21	Cilacap Selatan ^{(b)} (South Cilacap)	^{(b)} 112.91	79,433	83,948	85,270	Sidakaya	5 ^{(c)}	53211: 53215
33.01.22	Cilacap Tengah (Central Cilacap)	49.26	84,314	90,418	92,140	Gunungsimping	5 ^{(d)}	53221: 53225
33.01.23	Cilacap Utara (North Cilacap)	28.46	69,265	82,630	86,950	Gumilir	5 ^{(e)}	53231: 53235
	Totals ^{(b)}	2,323.93	1,642,107	1,944,857	2,046,392	Cilacap Tengah	284	

Notes: (a) except the desa of Cigintung (which has a post code of 53222) and the desa of Limbangan (which has a post code of 53232).
(b) includes the population and the area of the offshore island of Pulau Nusakambangan (or Tambakreja kelurahan).
(c) consists of the 5 kelurahan of Cilacap, Sidakaya, Tambakreja, Tegalkamulyan and Tegalreja.
(d) consists of the 5 kelurahan of Donan, Gunungsimping, Kutawaru, Lomanis and Sidanegara.
(e) consists of the 5 kelurahan of Gumilir, Karangtalun, Kebonmanis, Mertasinga and Tritih Kulon.

== Cilacap Town ==
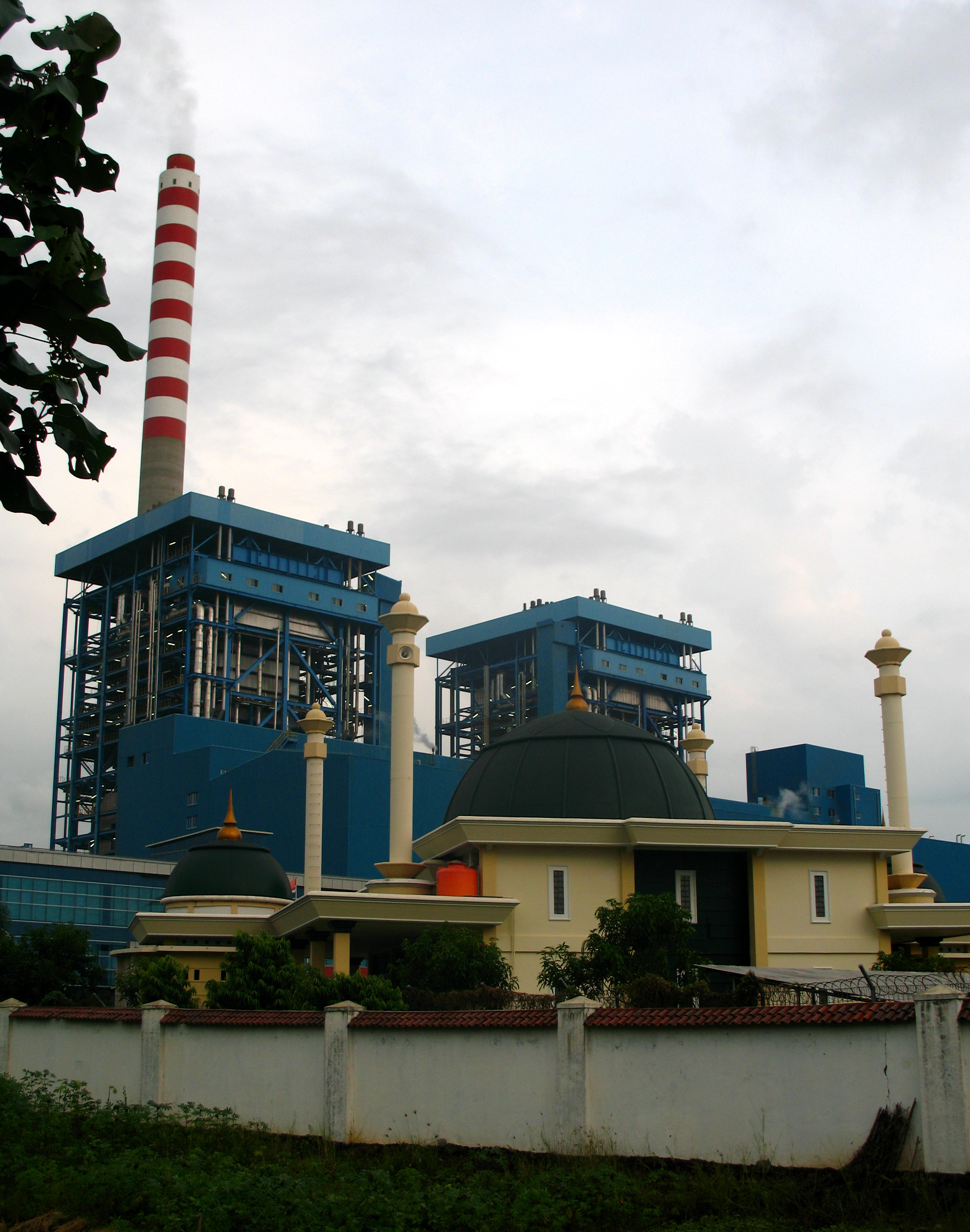
Cilacap's power plant provides 600 megawatts of electricity

The town of Cilacap is also a sea port on the southern coast of the island of Java. The port is one of only a few that exist on the southern coast that can service shipping of reasonable tonnage. The nearest safe anchorage east is Pacitan. The city's harbor is protected by Nusakambangan, an island best known as the site of several high-security correctional facilities although there are also hopes that the island can be developed as a tourist hub. Nusakambangan sheltered Cilacap from the worst of the 2004 tsunami. Nevertheless, the disaster took 147 lives, devastated beaches, damaged 435 fishing boats and inflicted material losses amounting to about Rp 86 billion (around $9 million).

During World War II Cilacap was an important departure point for people fleeing the Japanese invasion, especially Dutch colonists. Many left the Dutch East Indies by boat or seaplane, the majority heading for Broome in Western Australia.

The port is a hub for national or international trade. The town's Tunggul Wulung Airport provides scheduled airline services to Jakarta and Semarang.

Cilacap is the site of many industrial plants, a geothermal power plant, a cement plant (Holcim Indonesia), and one of Pertamina (Indonesia's national petroleum company) processing units in Indonesia. The site has the largest production capacity, producing the most diverse kinds of products among other Pertamina units.

The town of Cilacap offers several tourist attractions highlighting Banyumasan culture. The town has a number of beaches, two of the most popular being Teluk Penyu (close to the center of town), but these are somewhat fouled from leakage of the shipping vessels docked adjacent to this and Widara Payung. Nearby the Teluk Penyu beach is also an old Dutch fortress called Benteng Pendem. This fortress was built in stages during 1861-1879 by the Dutch East Indies Army.

The three administrative districts (kecamatan) which together comprise the town of Cilacap are sub-divided into the following fifteen urban villages (kelurahan), listed below with their areas and their populations according to the mid-2023 official estimates. The first five listed comprise South Cilacap District, the next five comprise Central Cilacap District, and the last five comprise North Cilacap District.

Kode Wilayah	Name of kelurahan	Area (km^{2})	Pop'n Estimate mid 2023	Post code
33.01.21.1001	Sidakaya	1.82	11,004	53212
33.01.21.1002	Cilacap (village)	2.00	19,554	53211
33.01.21.1003	Tambakreja	115.03	22,362	53213
33.01.21.1004	Tegalkamulyan	3.13	19,747	53215
33.01.21.1005	Tegalrejo	1.06	12,215	53215
33.01.22.1001	Lomanis	5.09	5,492	53221
33.01.22.1002	Gunungsimping	2.89	13,996	53224
33.01.22.1003	Sidanegara	4.01	31,326	53223
33.01.22.1004	Donan	3.70	28,393	53222
33.01.22.1005	Kutawaru	35.31	11,086	53225
33.01.23.1001	Mertasinga	5.28	20,110	53232
33.01.23.1002	Gumilir	3.58	18,257	53231
33.01.23.1003	Karangtalun	5.97	13,305	53224
33.01.23.1004	Triti Kulon	12.51	23,547	53233
33.01.23.1005	Kebonmanis	2.38	10,072	53235
Totals	Cilacap town	203.76	260,376	

== Segara Anakan Bay ==
In early 2012 Segara Anakan Bay's area was only 600 hectares, reduced from 700 hectares in 2005 after dredging. Heavy sedimentation from the Citanduy River (which is located on the border of Ciamis Regency and Cilacap Regency) caused it. To overcome the sedimentation in Segara Anakan Bay, Ciamis Regency agreed to a new canal from the Citanduy River passing through their area and exiting at Nusawiru near Pangandaran Beach.

== Climate ==
Cilacap has a tropical rainforest climate (Af) with heavy to very heavy rainfall year-round. In November 2025 heavy rains resulted in landslides. The following climate data is for the town of Cilacap.

Climate data for Cilacap (1991–2020 normals, extremes 1999–2023)
Month	Jan	Feb	Mar	Apr	May	Jun	Jul	Aug	Sep	Oct	Nov	Dec	Year
Record high °C (°F)	34.8 (94.6)	34.5 (94.1)	35.3 (95.5)	34.4 (93.9)	35.1 (95.2)	33.8 (92.8)	33.0 (91.4)	32.0 (89.6)	33.2 (91.8)	34.0 (93.2)	33.4 (92.1)	34.0 (93.2)	35.3 (95.5)
Mean daily maximum °C (°F)	32.0 (89.6)	32.1 (89.8)	32.1 (89.8)	32.0 (89.6)	31.4 (88.5)	30.4 (86.7)	29.3 (84.7)	29.1 (84.4)	29.5 (85.1)	30.2 (86.4)	30.8 (87.4)	31.4 (88.5)	30.9 (87.5)
Daily mean °C (°F)	27.6 (81.7)	27.5 (81.5)	27.7 (81.9)	28.1 (82.6)	28.0 (82.4)	27.1 (80.8)	26.2 (79.2)	25.9 (78.6)	26.4 (79.5)	27.0 (80.6)	27.2 (81.0)	27.4 (81.3)	27.2 (80.9)
Mean daily minimum °C (°F)	24.7 (76.5)	24.5 (76.1)	24.7 (76.5)	24.9 (76.8)	25.0 (77.0)	24.0 (75.2)	23.3 (73.9)	23.2 (73.8)	23.8 (74.8)	24.5 (76.1)	24.6 (76.3)	24.7 (76.5)	24.3 (75.8)
Record low °C (°F)	21.5 (70.7)	22.6 (72.7)	22.9 (73.2)	21.4 (70.5)	22.0 (71.6)	20.1 (68.2)	19.0 (66.2)	19.2 (66.6)	18.8 (65.8)	21.6 (70.9)	22.0 (71.6)	22.8 (73.0)	18.8 (65.8)
Average precipitation mm (inches)	319.9 (12.59)	284.8 (11.21)	279.6 (11.01)	292.7 (11.52)	267.5 (10.53)	201.9 (7.95)	133.1 (5.24)	57.5 (2.26)	115.8 (4.56)	370.8 (14.60)	483.8 (19.05)	436.0 (17.17)	3,243.4 (127.69)
Average precipitation days	17.7	17.2	15.7	15.8	13.1	10.2	7.4	4.3	6.0	12.8	18.2	19.5	157.9
Mean monthly sunshine hours	154.7	146.3	178.9	194.6	223.5	215.0	229.1	238.8	232.3	202.2	158.8	137.6	2,311.8
Source: Starlings Roost Weather

== Tourism gallery ==
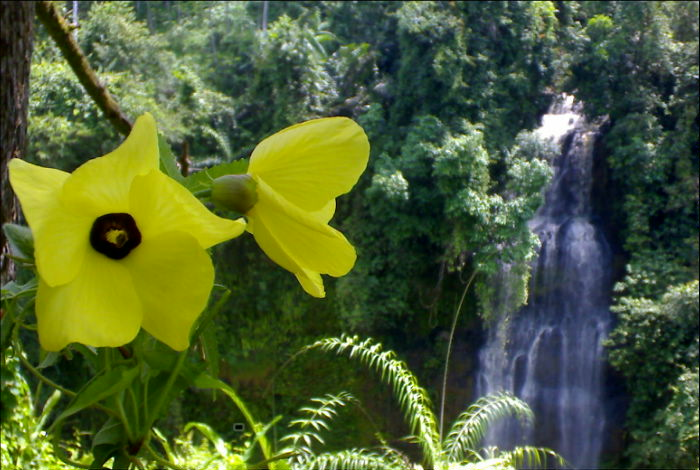
Cimandaway waterfall at district Dayeuhluhur, at Cikawalon River West Cilacap.
