= Mardjoko =

Indonesian civil servant and politician

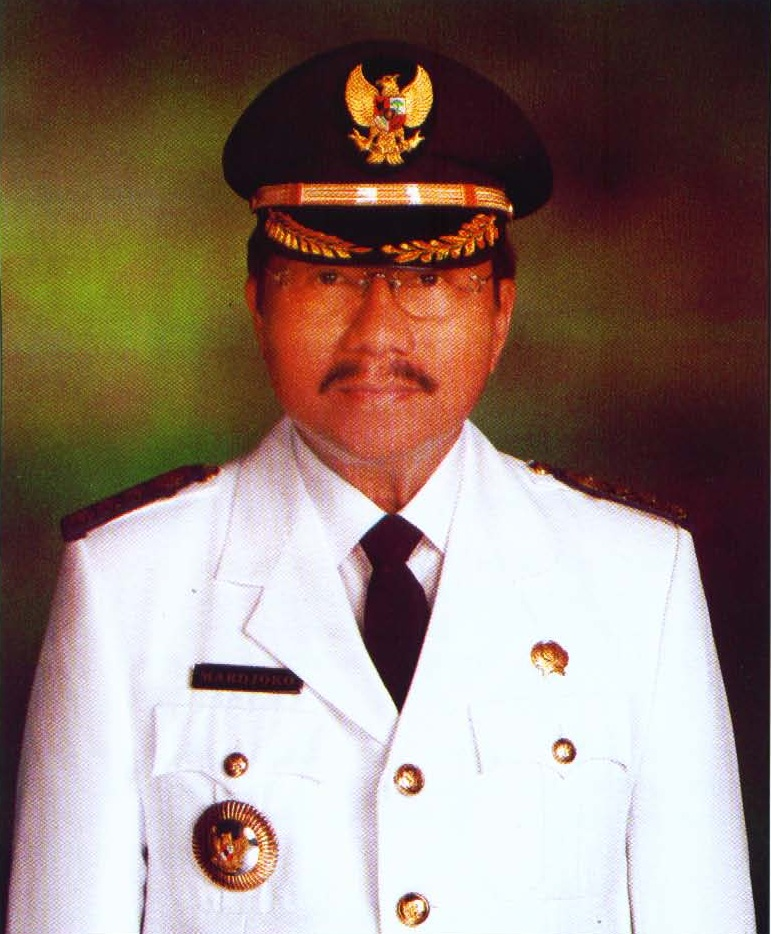

Regent of Banyumas
- In office 11 April 2008 – 11 April 2013
- Preceded by: Aris Setiono
- Succeeded by: Achmad Husein

Personal details
- Born: 13 March 1946 (age 79) Banyumas, Central Java, Indonesia

Mardjoko (born 13 March 1946) is an Indonesian former civil servant and politician of the National Awakening Party. He served as the regent of Banyumas Regency, Central Java between 2008 and 2013.

== Early life ==
Mardjoko was born on 13 March 1946 at the village of Notog, in Banyumas Regency. After completing elementary school there, he went to middle school and high school at the regency seat of Purwokerto.

== Career ==
He worked as a civil servant, at one point serving head of the customs office at the I Gusti Ngurah Rai International Airport (1992–1995) and as a deputy controller at the Investment Coordinating Board between 2004 and 2006.

=== Regent ===
In 2008, Mardjoko took part in Banyumas' first direct regent election with the support of the National Awakening Party (PKB) with local municipal water company director Achmad Husein as his running mate. The pair won the election with 36.35% of votes.

Two months after he was sworn in, he had issued a regulation prohibiting municipal employees from speaking to journalists on municipal finances and human resource management. This resulted in a protest by a group of journalists, and Mardjoko proceeded to remove the municipal government's head of public relations after blaming him for failing to communicate the policy. Mardjoko also ordered the removal of a street which bisected Purwokerto's alun-alun (town square) in order to beautify the area to attract investors, relocating a number of street vendors in the process. He promoted investment during his tenure, including hotels and restaurants, a cement factory, and a geothermal power plant. He also lobbied for an Indonesian Air Force airfield in neighboring Purbalingga Regency to be converted into a commercial airport. By 2012, municipal government receipt had increased to Rp 200 billion annually, a fivefold increase from 2007.

He frequently began speeches with opening words in the Banyumasan dialect, and later he promoted the dialect's use, resulting in the publication of the monthly Banyumasan magazine Ancas.

Mardjoko ran for reelection in 2013. However, he no longer secured PKB's support and instead ran with the endorsements of Golkar, Hanura, and Gerindra. He also switched his running mate to Gempol Suwandono, director of Banyumas' Regional General Hospital. They won 29.44% of votes, losing to PDI-P/PPP-backed Achmad Husein. He contested the 2018 regent election with the backing of a large coalition including PKB, PPP, Gerindra, Golkar, PAN and PKS, but again lost to Husein who secured 55.8% of votes.

== Personal life ==
He was married to Kusmiarsih, who died of a heart attack in 2019. They had three children.
