= Getuk goreng =

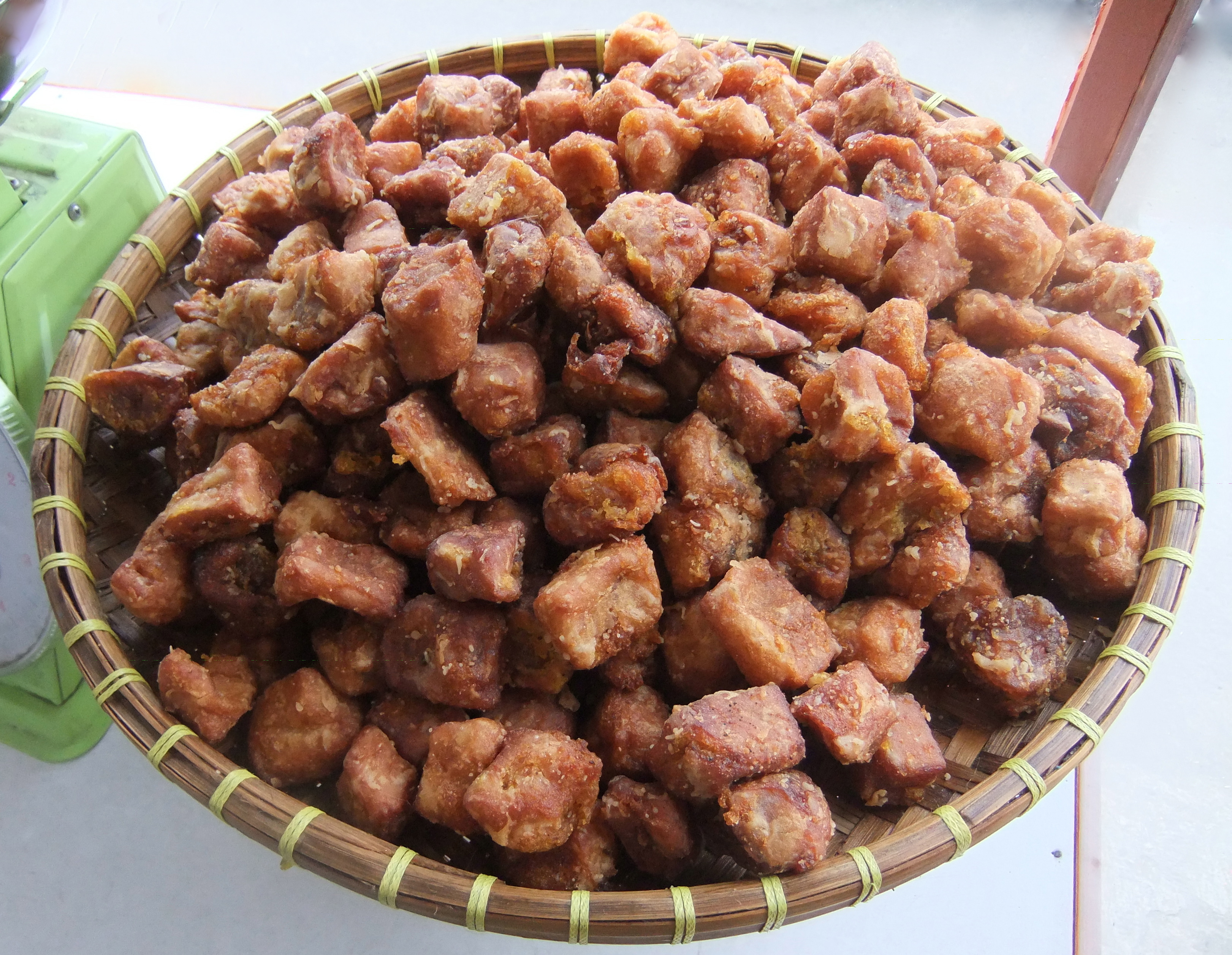
- Getuk goreng from Sokaraja
- Type: Snack
- Place of origin: Indonesia
- Region or state: Banyumas Regency, Banjarnegara Regency, Purbalingga Regency, Cilacap Regency
- Created by: Sunpringad
- Serving temperature: Warm
- Main ingredients: Cassava, brown sugar

Getuk goreng is a common dish from the Banyumas Regency of Central Java, Indonesia. Getuk goreng is made from cassava or usually the Banyumasan people call it boled with added brown sugar making this fried getuk sweet and savory.

== History ==
Getuk goreng was discovered in 1918 by accident by Sanpirngad, a nasi rames seller, around in Sokaraja. Getuk goreng was one of his trades at that time the merchandise he was selling did not sell, so he had the sense that it could be consumed again then fried fry that are not sold out are fried and sold again, it turns out that fried fry is favored by the buyer, now fried getuk is not a food that is no longer sold but rather a getuk that is deliberately sold.
