= Kemangkon, Purbalingga =

Kemangkon (Indonesian pronunciation: [kəˈmaŋkɔn]) is an administrative district (kecamatan) within the Purbalingga Regency of Central Java.

== Economy ==
The economy of Kemangkon is dominated by farming and factory.

== Demographics ==
Kemangkon had a population of 66,096 people at the mid-2023 official estimates, of which 97% are Banyumasan and use the traditional Banyumasan language. The majority of the inhabitants work as farmers.

== Geography ==
Kemangkon is located on Mount Slamet at the highest point within the Purbalingga Regency. It is located in the tropical forest of the region, with the Serayu and Klawing rivers running through it.

The district is home to 20 individual villages:

1. Bakulan
2. Bokol
3. Cengis
4. Gambarsari
5. Jetis
6. Kalialang
7. Karangkemiri
8. Karangtengah
9. Kedungbenda
10. Kedunglegok
11. Kemangkon
12. Majasem
13. Majatengah
14. Muntang
15. Panican
16. Pegandekan
17. Pelumutan
18. Senon
19. Sumilir
20. Toyareka

=== Points of attraction ===
Several sites sacred to the Kemangkon Banyumasan religion are located in or near Kemangkon, including

- Mount Kidul
- Serayu River
- Klawing River
