= Bakulan =

Coordinates: 7°26′42.6″S 109°22′56.9″E

- Location in Central Java
- Country: Indonesia
- Province: Central Java
- Regency: Purbalingga

Government
  - Village Chief (Perbekel): Sulistio R

Area
  - Total: 30 km^{2} (12 sq mi)

Population
  - Total: 1,376
  - Density: 46/km^{2} (120/sq mi)
- Postal code: 53381

Bakulan (Indonesian pronunciation: [baˈkulan]) is a village in Kemangkon, Purbalingga, Central Java, Indonesia.
