= Sumanto =

Former Indonesian convicted criminal

- Born: 3 March 1972 (age 54); Purbalingga, Central Java, Indonesia
- Known for: Cannibalistic acts
- Criminal charges: Aggravated theft
- Criminal penalty: Five years in prison
- Criminal status: Released
- Spouse: Sutrimah; Tugiyem
- Children: Titis Wahyu Widianti
- Relatives: Mulyati (sister), Karyono (brother), Maryati (sister), Mulyanto (brother)

Sumanto (born 3 March 1972) is an Indonesian man who gained notoriety among the Indonesian public for his infamous cannibalistic acts where he consumed three corpses from different locations, namely Lampung and Purbalingga. After a police investigation into the disappearance of an 81-year-old woman's corpse just hours after her burial, his cannibalism came to light and Sumanto was arrested on 13 January 2003, being charged with aggravated theft under Article 363 of the criminal code and sentenced to five years in prison on 27 June 2003.

On 24 October 2006, Sumanto was released early due to reported good behavior according to prison authorities. He was then taken in by the An-Nur rehabilitation center in Bungkanel, Karanganyar, Purbalingga, as neither his family nor his village wanted to accept him back.

In 2025, Sumanto played as cameo in a 2025 Indonesian horror film, Labinak: Mereka ada di Sini.

== Biography ==
=== Early life ===
Born on 3 March 1972, Sumanto was the eldest of five children—Mulyati, Karyono, Maryati, dan Mulyanto—and lived a comfortable childhood due to the inheritance money his father received from his grandparents. Nicknamed Suman by his friends, he attended SD Negeri Pelumutan 1 for his elementary education. Due to inadequate national exam scores, Sumanto was forced to repeat 6th Grade at SD Negeri Pelumutan 2 and was hindered from attending his chosen middle school at SMP Negeri 1 Kemangkon. Once he graduated, he was finally accepted into his preferred middle school, yet in his third year there, he dropped out.

=== Case ===
On 11 January 2003, the corpse of an 81-year-old woman named Mbok Rimah disappeared just 16 hours after her burial. Alarmed by her exhumation, locals reported the incident to the authorities. A police investigation led to Sumanto, who was found with her remains found throughout his house. Arrested two days later, he was charged with aggravated theft under Article 363 of the criminal code.

During Sumanto's court case, prosecutors demanded a six-year prison sentence, but his defense team objected, citing his diagnosed mental disorder by the Central Java Psychological Department. The team also argued that the corpse was not considered an object or property, but rather human waste discarded through burial. The judges however were unconvinced and Sumanto was sentenced to five years in prison on 27 June 2003, a lighter sentence than what the prosecutors had wanted.

Authorities revealed Mbok Rimah was not Sumanto's first victim. A masseur by the name of Mistam had also gone missing after giving Sumanto a massage with his clothes later found at Sumanto's house. The Purbalingga police chief suggested there may have been more than three victims.

Sumanto explained his reasoning for the heinous acts committed, believing that he would gain supernatural powers such as invulnerability and the ability to resurrect the dead. He had reportedly learned black magic while in Lampung from a man named Taslim.

== Personal life ==
Sumanto has been married twice. His first marriage was to Sutrimah, whom he met while working in Lampung, while his second marriage was to Tugiyem in 1993, a coworker at the sugarcane company they were both employed in. Both of his marriages ended in divorce however, primarily due to recurring incidents of domestic violence. He had a daughter with Tugiyem named Titis Wahyu Widianti.
