= Pelumutan =

Village in Kemangkon, Purbalingga, Indonesia

Coordinates: 7°28′51″S 109°22′00″E

- Village
- Interactive map of Pelumutan
- Province: Central Java
- Regency: Purbalingga
- District: Kemangkon

Dimensions
  - Width: 30 km (19 mi)
- Postal code: 53381

Pelumutan (Indonesian pronunciation: [pəluˈmut̪an]) is a village located in Kemangkon, Purbalingga, Central Java, Indonesia. Nearby rivers include Serayu and Klawing.
