= Banyumasan dialect =

Language mainly spoken on the island of Java

Banyumasan
- basa Banyumasan, basa Ngapak
- Native to: Western part of Central Java (Indonesia)
- Ethnicity: Banyumasan
- Native speakers: 13,940,028 (2023)
- Language family: Austronesian: Malayo-Polynesian; Javanese; Banyumasan
- Dialects: Banyumasan, Bumiayu, Wonosobo

Language codes
- ISO 639-3: –
- Glottolog: bany1247
- Areas where Banyumasan is spoken by a majority of the population Areas where Banyumasan is spoken by a significant minority of the population

Banyumasan (basa Banyumasan), also known by its autoglottonym Ngapak (basa Ngapak), is a dialect of Javanese spoken mainly in three areas of Java: the Banyumasan region in the westernmost part of Central Java province and surrounding the Dieng Plateau, Mount Slamet and Serayu River; a neighboring area inside West Java province; This area includes Cilacap, Kebumen, Banjarnegara, Purbalingga, Banyumas, Wonosobo regencies, southern part of Pemalang, southern part of Pekalongan, southern part of Batang and, together with independent cities within that region. Banyumasan is considered as one of the most conservative Javanese dialects, retaining the phonology and some aspects of Old Javanese (Kawi) grammar and vocabulary.

== History ==
Scholars divide the development of Javanese language into four different stages:

- 9th–13th century, known as Old Javanese.
- 13th–16th century, developed to Middle Javanese.
- 16th–20th century, developed to Early Modern Javanese.
- Since 20th century, developed to Modern Javanese.

The phases above were influenced by the emergence of empires in Java. In Javanese cultural history, empires yielded some distinct grades of language, each grade representing the social grade of the speakers (mainly nobles and populaces). Those grades of language are not of significant influence to Banyumasan people. In the Banyumasan region, high grades are usually used only when speaking to a stranger assumed to come from the eastern area of Java i.e. Yogyakarta / Surakarta etc., or on certain occasions. Nowadays the Banyumasan people use high grade Javanese to a stranger, a noble man and older people. Surakartan and Yogyakartan style are usually considered the standard Javanese language.

== Vocabulary ==
Banyumasan many differences compared to standard Javanese, mainly in phonology, pronunciation and vocabulary. This happened due to cultural or character distinction and widely current usage of Old Javanese vocabulary. Another distinction is that the pronunciation of the vowels is not as complicated.

Vocabulary distinction is basically found in:

- Same word and phonetic but different meaning
- Same word and meaning but different phonetic
- Same phonetic and meaning but different pronunciation (changed on consonant or vowel).

| Banyumasan | Standard Javanese | English |
|---|---|---|
| ageh | ayo | come on |
| ambring | sepi | quiet |
| batir | kanca | friend |
| bangkong | kodok | frog |
| bengel | mumet | dizzy |
| bodhol | rusak | broken |
| brug → Dutch loanwords | kreteg | bridge |
| bringsang | sumuk | hot |
| gering | kuru | thin |
| clebek | kopi | coffee |
| londhog | alon | slow |
| druni | medhit | stingy |
| dhonge/dhongane | kudune | should be |
| egin | isih | still |
| gableg | duwe | have |
| getul | tekan | arrive |
| gigal | tiba | fall |
| gili | dalan | road |
| gujih | rewel | fussy |
| jagong | lungguh | sit |
| kiye | iki | this |
| kuwe | iku | that |
| letek | asin | salty |
| maen | apik | good |
| maregi | nyebeli | badly |

== Politeness ==
Javanese speech varies depending on social context, yielding three distinct styles, or registers. Each style employs its own vocabulary, grammatical rules and even prosody. This is not unique to Javanese; neighbouring Austronesian languages as well as East Asian languages such as Korean, Japanese and Thai share similar constructions.

In Javanese these styles are called:

1. Ngoko is informal speech, used between friends and close relatives. It is also used by persons of higher status to persons of lower status, such as elders to younger people or bosses to subordinates.
2. Madya is the intermediary form between ngoko and krama. An example of the context where one would use madya is an interaction between strangers on the street, where one wants to be neither too formal nor too informal.
3. Krama is the polite and formal style. It is used between persons of the same status who do not wish to be informal. It is also the official style for public speeches, announcements, etc.

In the Banyumasan region, Madya and Krama styles are rarely used, usually towards a stranger who is assumed to come from the eastern area of Java (wetanan) such as Yogyakarta, Surakarta etc. or on certain occasions, an eastern style of language (basa wetanan) named bandhekan (from gandhek).

== sub-Dialects ==
There are two main dialects of Banyumasan: Western Banyumasan and Eastern Banyumasan (Wonosobo)

The Western Banyumasan sub-dialect is spoken in southern areas: Bumiayu, Karang Pucung, Cilacap, Nusakambangan Island, Kroya, Ajibarang, Wangon, Purwokerto, Purbalingga, Bobotsari, western part of Banjarnegara and Kebumen (included Gombong)

The Wonosobo sub-dialect is spoken in Wonosobo Regency, eastern part of Banjarnegara Regency and northeastern part of Kebumen Regency.

In addition, there are several sub-dialects spoken in Banyumasan, such as Bumiayu, Lakbok, and Ayah.

== See also ==
- Javanese script
- Java
- Hans Ras
- Banyumasan people
