= Bojongsari, Purbalingga =

District in Purbalingga Regency, Central Java, Indonesia

Bojongsari
- District

Other transcription(s)
  - Javanese: ꦧꦺꦴꦗꦺꦴꦁꦱꦫꦶ
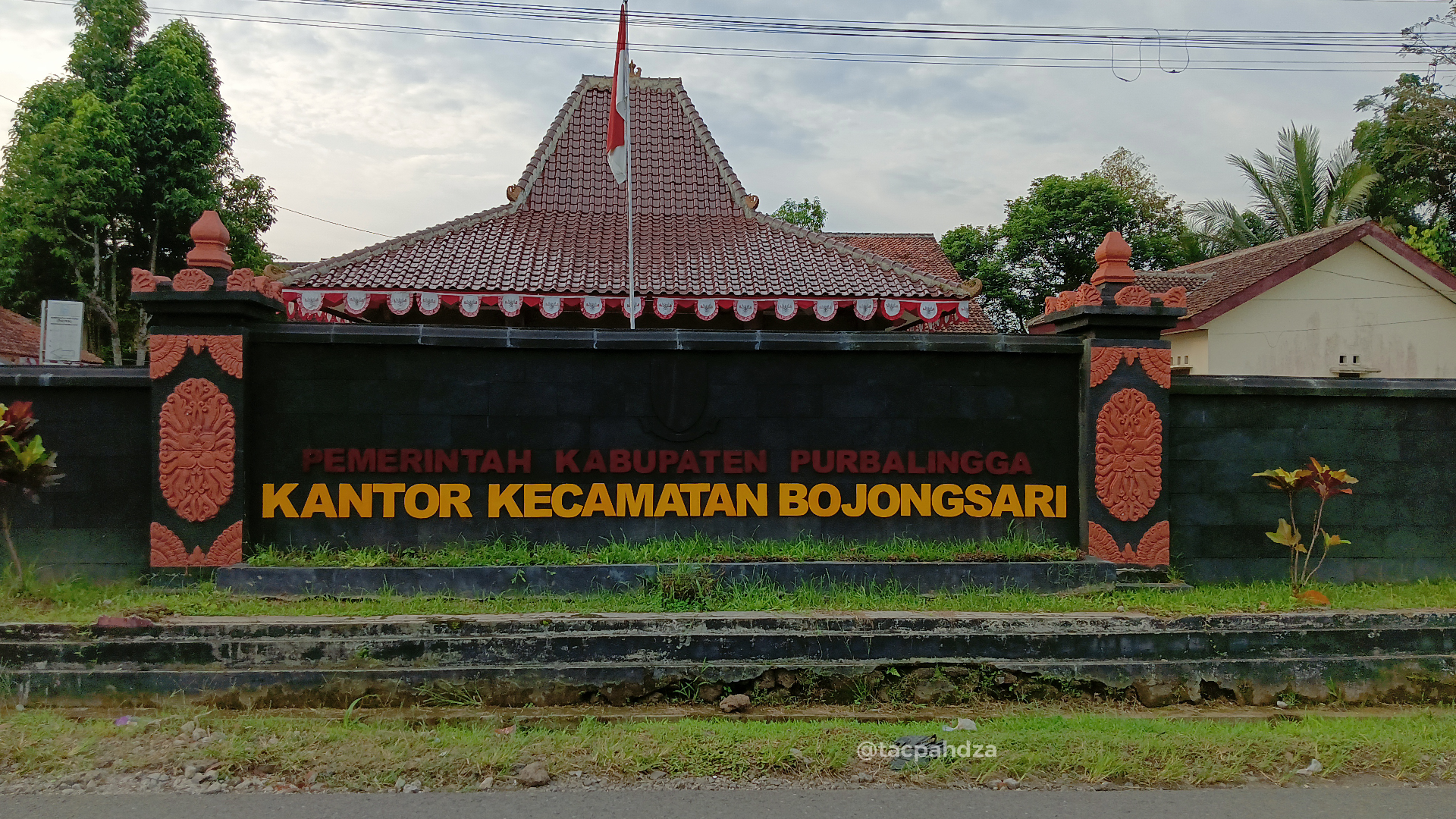
- Bojongsari District Office

- Location within Java Location within Indonesia
- Coordinates: 7°21′9.8064″S 109°21′18.9252″E
- Country: Indonesia
- Province: Central Java
- Regency: Purbalingga Regency
- Capital: Bojongsari

Government
  - District head: Sugeng Riyadi SH

Area
  - Total: 44.99 km^{2} (17.37 sq mi)

Population (mid 2024 estimate)
  - Total: 64,967
- Time zone: UTC+7 (WIB)
- Area code: 0281
- Website: kecamatanbojongsari.purbalinggakab.go.id

Bojongsari is a district in Purbalingga Regency, Central Java, Indonesia. This district is about 10 km away from Purbalingga, the capital city of Purbalingga Regency. The northern part of this district is the slopes of Mount Slamet.

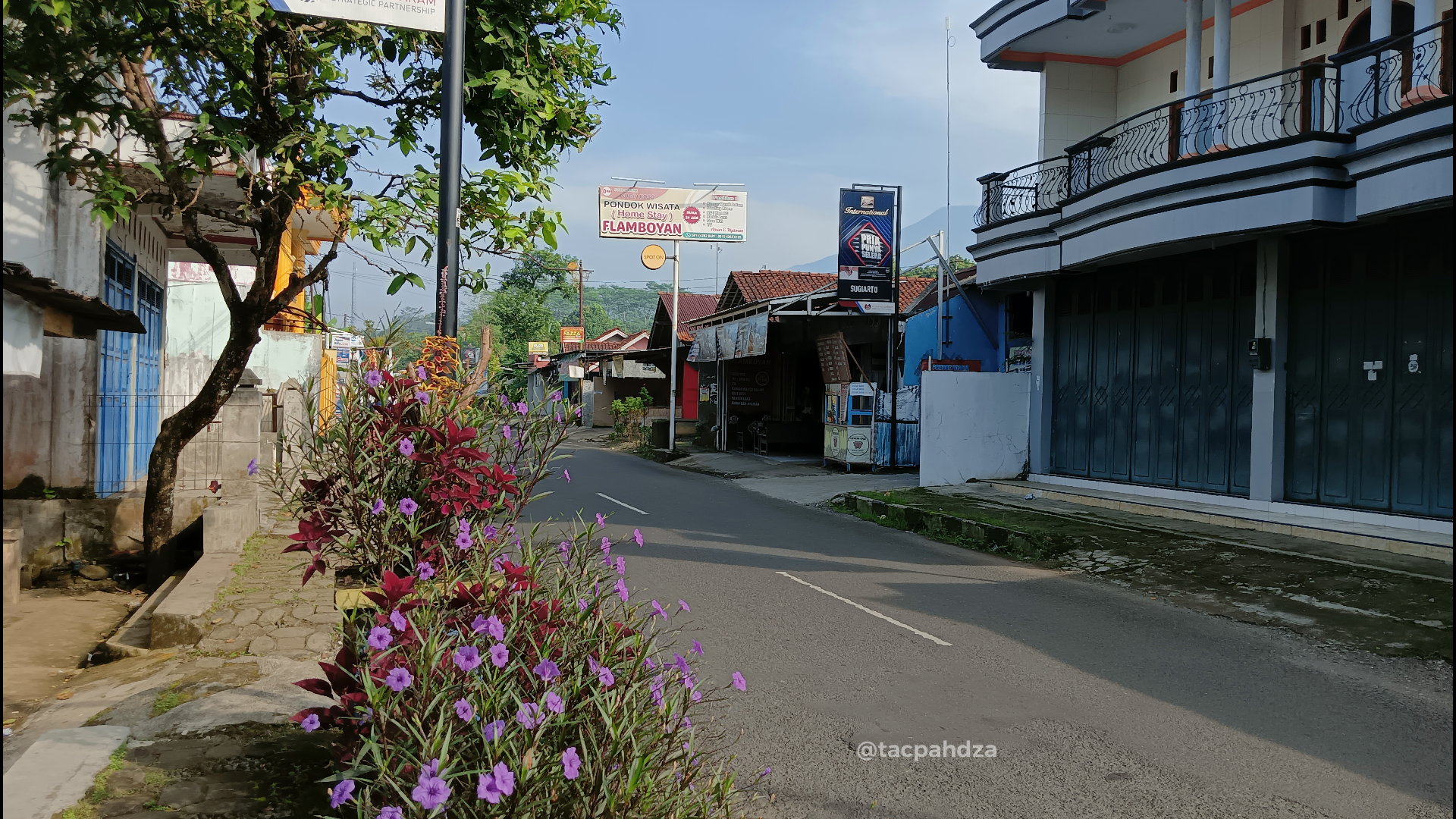
Owabong Rd, Bojongsari

== History ==
Bojongsari District was established in the early 90s, the area of Bojongsari District was the Kutasari District's area at that time. Then, half of Kutasari district area was separated into Bojongsari District.

== Geography ==
Bojongsari district is bordered by Mrebet District and Karangreja District to the north, Kaligondang District and Mrebet District to the east, Purbalingga District to the south, Kutasari District and Padamara District to the west.

== Subdivisions ==
Bojongsari district has 13 villages

- Banjaran
- Beji
- Bojongsari (the capital of Bojongsari district)
- Brobot
- Bumisari
- Galuh
- Gembong
- Kajongan
- Karangbanjar
- Metenggeng
- Pagedangan
- Patemon
- Pekalongan

== Tourist attractions ==
- Owabong, located in Bojongsari village. Owabong is a water park and also a mini zoo, Owabong also has facilities such as a 4d cinema, games such as flying fox, zipline, wave pool, etc.

== See also ==
- List of districts of Central Java
