= Plumutan, Bancak, Semarang =

Coordinates: 7°15′24″S 110°37′07″E

Plumutan is a village in Kemangkon district, Central Java, Indonesia. The village has two mosques, the Taman Pendidikan Al-Qur'an (TPQ/TPA) Al Huda mosque and the Majelis Taklim (MT) Al Muttaqin mosque.

== Economy ==
Most of people work a farmer and half a factory.
