= Bokol =

Coordinates: 7°28′S 109°21′E

- Location in Central Java
- Country: Indonesia
- Province: Central Java
- Regency: Purbalingga

Area
  - Total: 1.3095 km^{2} (0.5056 sq mi)

Population (2017)
  - Total: 2,185
  - Density: 1,669/km^{2} (4,322/sq mi)
- Postal code: 53381

Bokol (Indonesian pronunciation: [ˈbɔkɔl]) is a village in the Kemangkon District, Central Java, Indonesia.
