= Aris Setiono =

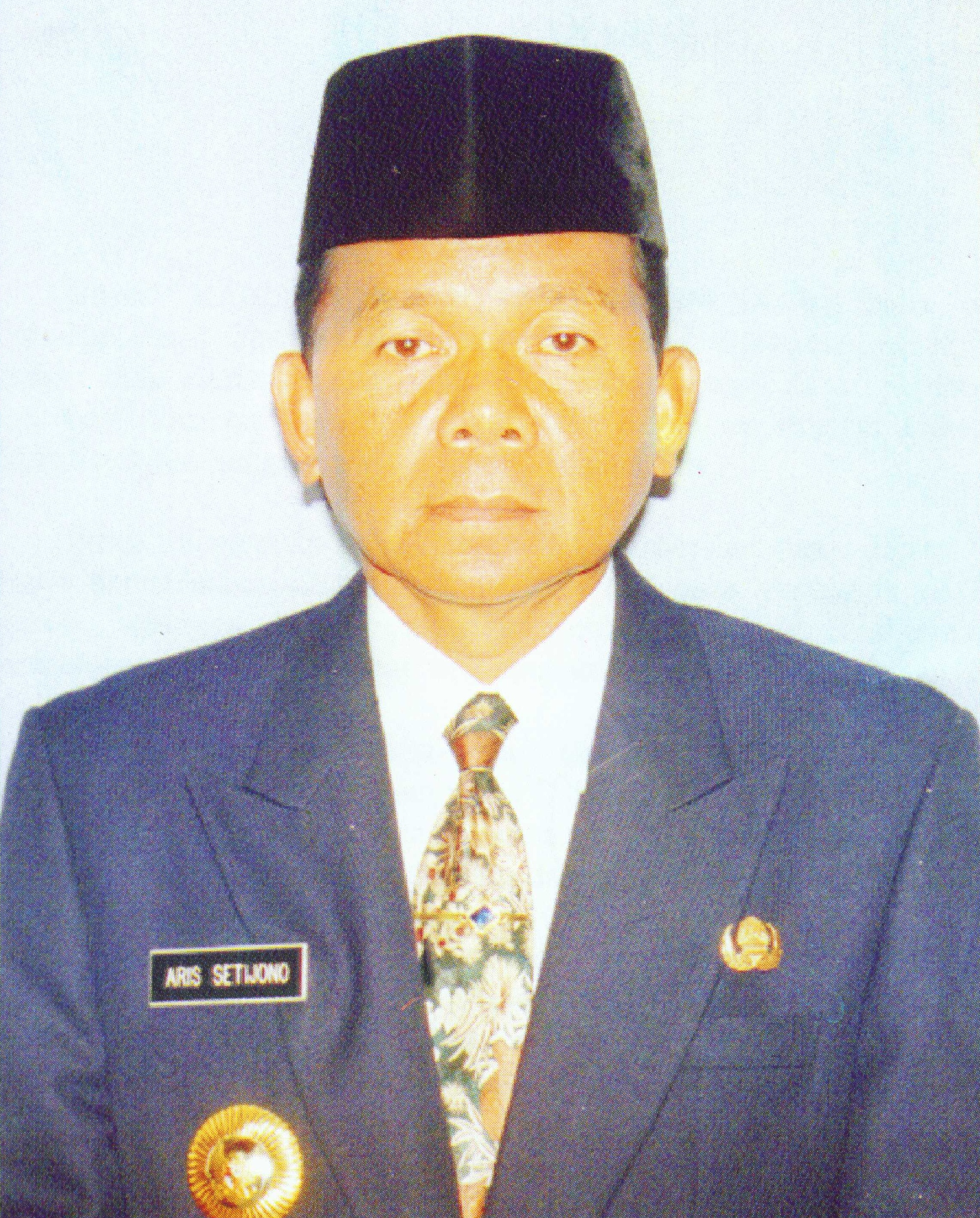

Regent of Banyumas
- In office 11 April 1998 – 11 April 2008
- Preceded by: Djoko Sudantoko
- Succeeded by: Mardjoko

Personal details
- Born: 30 November 1947 Wonogiri, Indonesia
- Died: 28 December 2014 (aged 67) Semarang, Indonesia

Military service
- Branch/service: Indonesian Army
- Years of service: 1970–1998
- Rank: Colonel

Aris Setiono (30 November 1947 – 28 December 2014) was an Indonesian former politician and military officer. He served as the regent of Banyumas Regency in Central Java for two terms between 1998 and 2008. Prior to entering government, he served in the Indonesian Army and reached the rank of colonel.

== Early life ==
Aris Setiono was born on 30 November 1947 to farmer parents in Wonogiri Regency, Central Java. After completing elementary school in his home village, he went to middle school and high school at Wonogiri's regency seat, 27 kilometers away from his home. He applied to universities in Yogyakarta and Semarang after completing high school, but he was not accepted and he went back home, working as a farmer and briefly as a teacher at a middle school. In 1965, he joined a militia purging alleged Communist Party members.

== Career ==
After his time in the militia, he enrolled at the Indonesian Armed Forces Academy in 1967 and graduated in 1970. He spent much of his career in the military as part of Korem 073 of Kodam IV/Diponegoro, eventually reaching the rank of colonel in the artillery branch.

On 18 March 1998, the Banyumas Regency Regional House of Representatives elected Setiono as regent of Banyumas with 35 of 45 cast votes, and he was sworn in on 11 April 1998. In 2003, he ran for a second term against two competitors, and although he placed second in the first round of voting, he won 28 out of 45 votes in the second round.

As regent, he initiated a loan program to small businesses in 2007, which his predecessors would continue. He also upgraded and relocated the regency's bus terminal in Purwokerto.

== Personal life ==
Setiono was a Muslim. He was married to Hariyani, and the couple had two children. He died at his home in Semarang on 28 December 2014, and was buried on the same day at the Mount Carmel Muslim Cemetery in Ungaran.
