= Fahmi Muhammad Hanif =

Indonesian politician (born 1996)

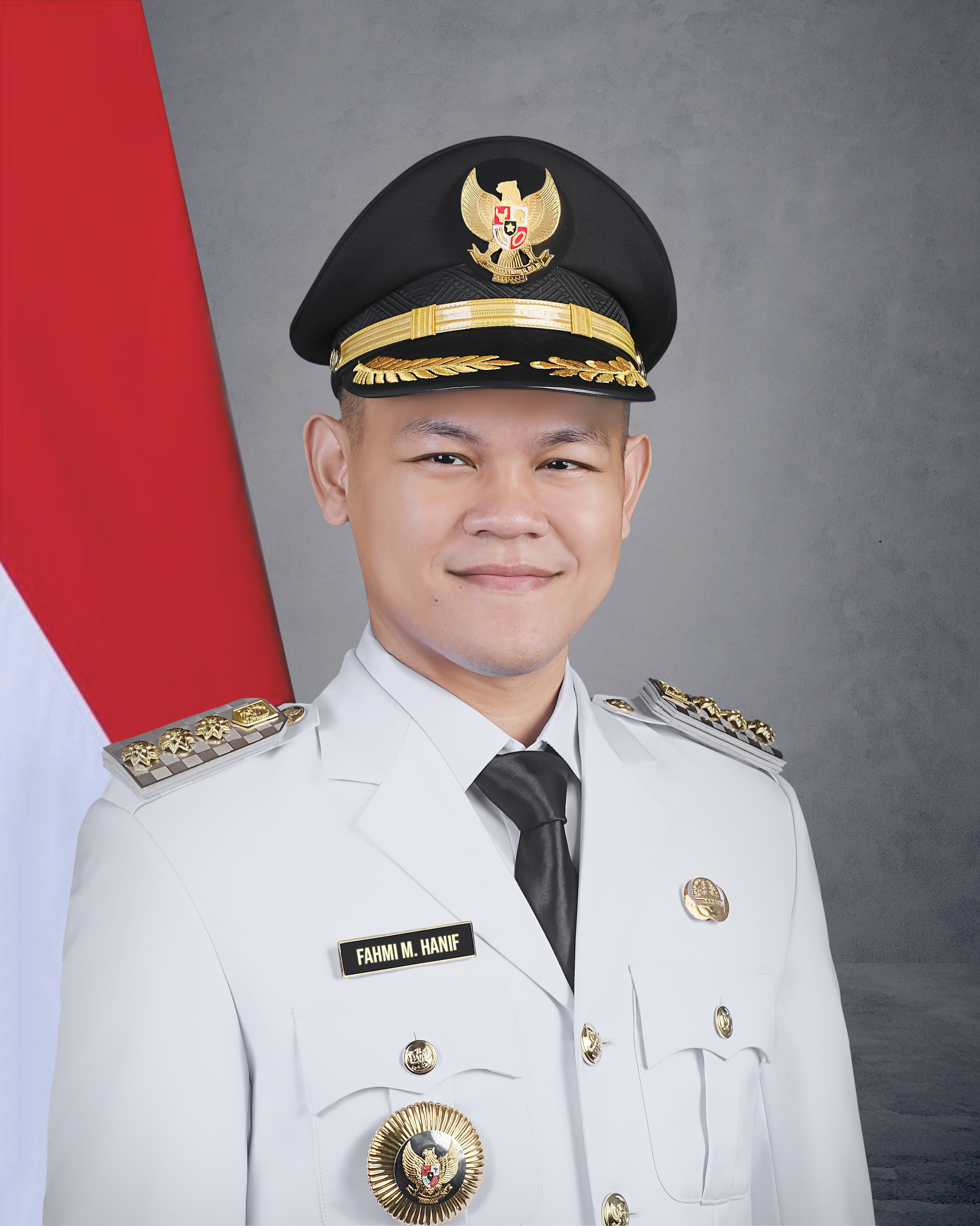
- Fahmi Muhammad Hanif in 2025

Regent of Purbalingga
- Incumbent
- Assumed office 20 February 2025
- Preceded by: Dyah Hayuning Pratiwi

Personal details
- Born: 2 September 1996 (age 29)
- Party: Prosperous Justice Party
- Parent: Rofik Hananto (father)

Fahmi Muhammad Hanif (born 2 September 1996) is an Indonesian politician serving as regent of Purbalingga since 2025. He is the son of Rofik Hananto.
