= Bobotsari, Purbalingga =

Bobotsari
- District

Other transcription(s)
  - Javanese: ꦧꦺꦴꦧꦺꦴꦠ꧀ꦱꦫꦶ
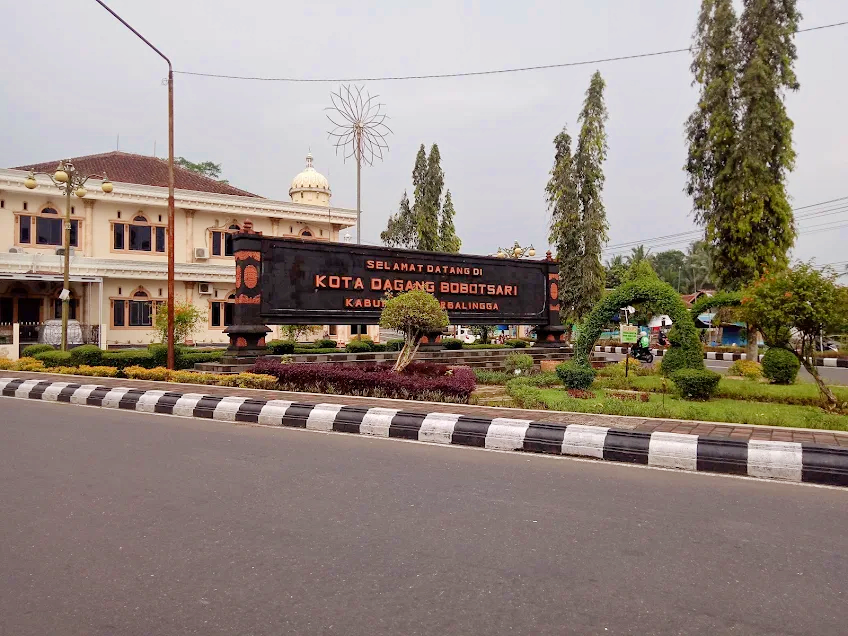
- Bobotsari town park

- Location within Java Location within Indonesia
- Coordinates: 7°18′21.1″S 109°22′05.1″E
- Country: Indonesia
- Province: Central Java
- Regency: Purbalingga Regency
- Capital: Bobotsari (de jure); Gandasuli (de facto)

Government
  - District head: Ari Wibowo SSos

Area
  - Total: 35.54 km^{2} (13.72 sq mi)

Population (mid 2024 estimate)
  - Total: 54,800
- Time zone: UTC+7 (WIB)
- Area code: 0281
- Website: kecamatanbobotsari.purbalinggakab.go.id

Bobotsari is a town and administrative district (kecamatan) in Purbalingga Regency, Central Java, Indonesia. Its capital is in the town of Bobotsari, though Gandasuli was sometimes considered the de facto capital of Bobotsari District. Bobotsari is also the second largest district town (id:Kota kecamatan) after Purbalingga in Purbalingga Regency.

== Geography ==
Bobotsari District is bordered by Karangreja District and Karangjambu District to the north, Karanganyar District to the east, and Mrebet District to the south and west.

=== Villages ===
Bobotsari district comprises 16 villages

- Banjarsari
- Bobotsari (the capital of Bobotsari district)
- Dagan
- Gandasuli
- Gunungkarang
- Kalapacung
- Karangduren
- Karangmalang
- Karangtalun
- Limbasari
- Majapura
- Pakuncen
- Palumbungan
- Palumbungan Wetan
- Talagening
- Tlagayasa

== See also ==
- Purbalingga Regency
- District of Indonesia
- List of districts of Central Java
