= Achmad Husein =

Indonesian politician (born 1959)

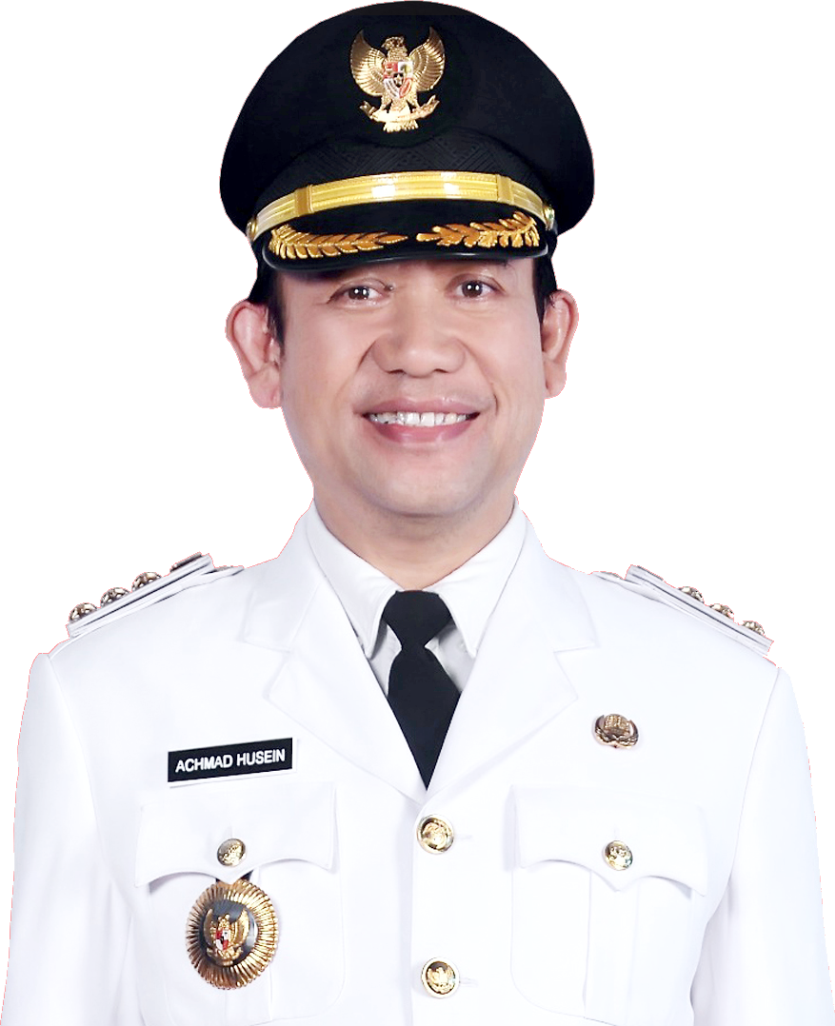

Regent of Banyumas
- In office 24 September 2018 – 24 September 2023
- In office 11 April 2013 – 11 April 2018
- Preceded by: Mardjoko
- Succeeded by: Sadewo Tri Lastiono

Personal details
- Born: 17 August 1959 (age 66) Jakarta, Indonesia
- Party: PDI-P

Achmad Husein (born 17 August 1959) is an Indonesian politician of the Indonesian Democratic Party of Struggle. He served as the regent of Banyumas Regency, Central Java for two terms in 2013–2018 and 2018–2023, and was previously Banyumas' vice regent from 2008 to 2013.

== Early life ==
Achmad Husein was born in Jakarta on 17 August 1959 to Agus Taruno and R.A. Soenarti. He spent his childhood in Banyumas and studied at public schools there. According to Husein, he had learning difficulties during his time at elementary school, and was forced to repeat school years twice. He eventually graduated high school from Purwokerto's State High School No. 1. He then studied civil engineering and obtained a bachelor's degree from the Bandung Institute of Technology.

== Career ==
Husein began to work as a civil engineering supervisor in Jakarta in 1986, and by 1990 he was a project manager at Chiyoda. In 1999, he moved to Jakarta's municipal water company PAM Jaya as a project control manager. By 2003, he had moved to Surabaya where he became distribution director of the city's municipal water company (PDAM Surabaya), and in 2005 he joined Banyumas Regency's PDAM as president director. In 2008, he ran as the running mate of Mardjoko for Banyumas' regency election, and the pair was elected after winning 321,106 votes in the four-way race.

=== Regent ===
Husein ran in Banyumas' 2013 regency election with Budhi Setiawan as running mate against Mardjoko's reelection with the backing of PDI-P and PPP, securing a victory in the six-way race after winning around 45 percent of votes. He would later be reelected in 2018 with Sadewo Tri Lastiono as running mate, again defeating Mardjoko in a head-to-head race with 515,329 votes (55.8%).

Shortly prior to the end of his first term, he faced protests from locals around Banyumas' landfill site who demanded its closure. Husein struck a deal with locals to keep the landfill open but to reduce the amount of trash disposed there, and he established waste recycling facilities in the regency's temporary landfills to do so. The facilities processed plastic waste (converted to fuel) and organic waste (used for black soldier fly breeding for animal feed), in addition to conducting pyrolysis with the final residue being used as an asphalt mixture. Municipal civil servants and contract workers were also required to collect 1 kg of inorganic waste (typically plastic) to the municipal waste agency each month following a 2016 instruction by Husein. Husein would take part in COP27 in Egypt as a speaker due to his trash-related work in Banyumas.

His term also saw the development of infrastructure projects such as a new retention basin and a new monument as a landmark in Purwokerto, along with a SME municipal loan program.

Late in his tenure, he began campaigning for Ganjar Pranowo in the leadup to the 2024 Indonesian presidential election. After his term as regent, Husein ran for a seat in the House of Representatives from Central Java's 8th district (Banyumas and Cilacap) for the 2024 legislative election. He placed third among PDI-P candidates in the district, but the party's vote allocated just two seats, and thus he was not elected.

== Personal life ==
He is married to Erna Sulistyowati, and the couple has three children. He received the nobility title Kanjeng Pangeran Haryo Adipati Purbowinoto from the Surakarta Sunanate in 2021. In mid-2025, he suffered a stroke while receiving medical treatment in Zhengzhou, China, resulting in him staying in intensive care there for a month before he returned to Indonesia in July.
