= Sadewo Tri Lastiono =

Indonesian politician (born 1966)

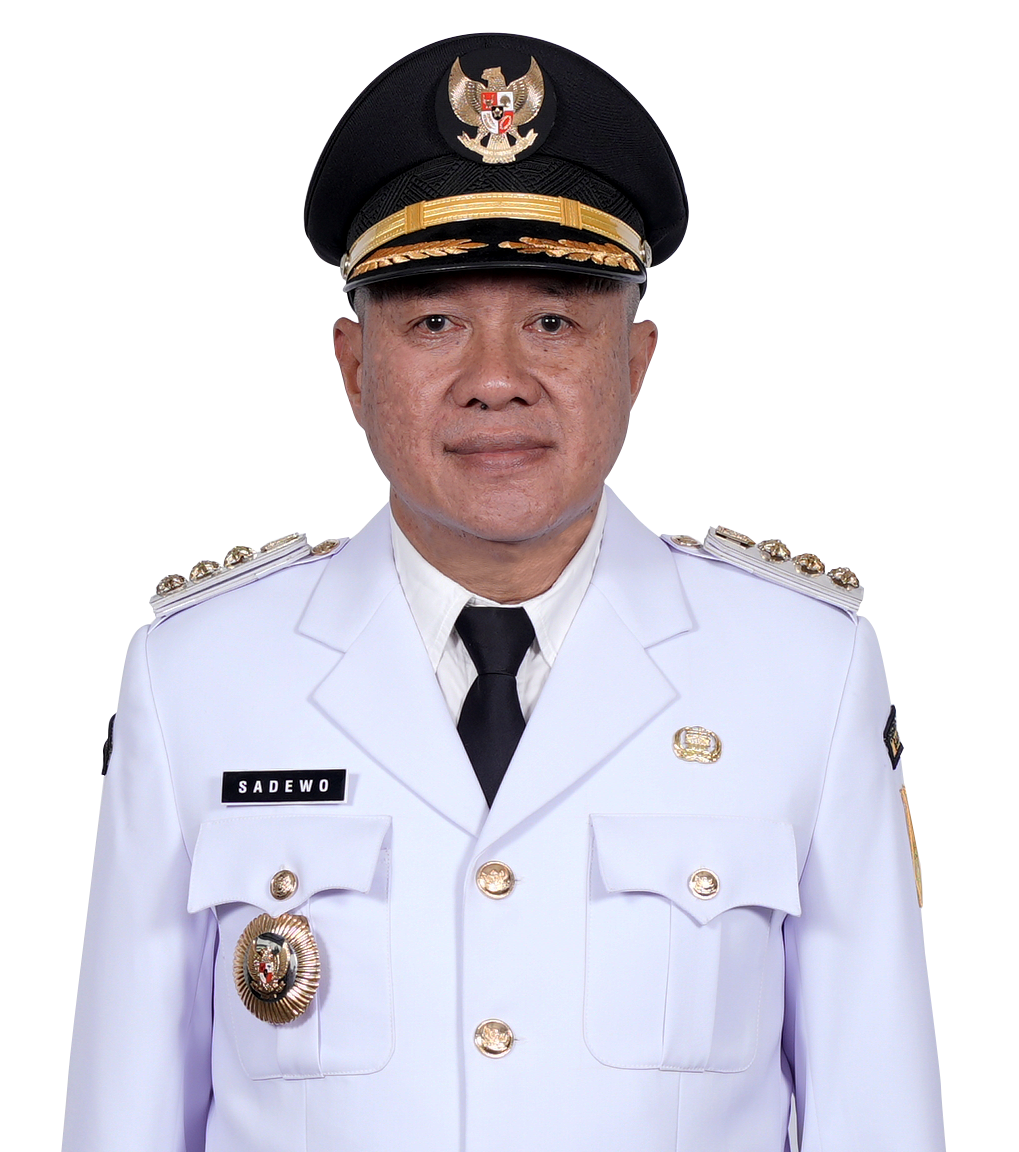

Regent of Banyumas
- Incumbent
- Assumed office 20 February 2025
- Preceded by: Achmad Husein; Iwanuddin Iskandar (act.)

Personal details
- Born: 21 April 1966 (age 60) Purwokerto, Central Java, Indonesia
- Party: PDI-P

Sadewo Tri Lastiono (born 21 April 1966) is an Indonesian politician of the Indonesian Democratic Party of Struggle who has been the regent of Banyumas, Central Java since February 2025. He was previously Banyumas' vice regent from 2018 to 2023 and a member of its Regional House of Representatives from 2004 to 2009. Prior to entering politics, he ran a construction company.

== Early life ==
Sadewo Tri Lastiono was born on 21 April 1966 in the town of Purwokerto, the regency seat of Banyumas. He studied at state-funded schools there until he graduated high school from Purwokerto State High School No. 2 (SMAN 2 Purwokerto), and then studied hydrology at Gadjah Mada University, graduating in 1990. He later received a master's degree in management from the Muhammadiyah University of Purwokerto in 2022.

== Career ==
After graduating from Gadjah Mada, Lastiono started a construction business under the name Tiara Group. He was active in business organizations, being part of Banyumas' construction services association and its chamber of commerce.

By 2004, Lastiono had entered politics and was elected into Banyumas' Regional House of Representatives (DPRD Banyumas) as a member of the Indonesian Democratic Party of Struggle, where he served for one term. He was made chairman of the party's South Purwokerto district branch in 2010, and in 2018 he ran as running mate of Achmad Husein in the regency's election. The pair was elected with 55.7 percent of the vote, and were sworn in on 24 September 2018.

=== Regent ===
Lastiono would run as regent in the 2024 regency election, with National Awakening Party member of DPRD Banyumas Dwi Asih Lintarti as his running mate. The pair ran uncontested in the election, securing 540,554 votes (59.4%) against the blank box option. They were sworn in on 20 February 2025.

As regent, Lastiono criticized the central government's free school lunch program, namely its lack of consultation and participation by local governments. He later clarified that he supported the program, but requested stronger oversight to prevent cases of food poisoning. He also initiated a free health examination program in schools, and an incentive payment scheme for local RT/RW leaders.

== Personal life ==
He is married to Nuraeni Tri Haryanti. Prior to becoming regent, he had also become manager at the junior club of local football club Persibas Banyumas (2005–2008) and chaired the regency's roller-skating association.
