= Mrebet, Purbalingga =

Mrebet
- District

Other transcription(s)
  - Javanese: ꦩꦿꦼꦧꦼꦠ꧀
- Location within Java Location within Indonesia
- Coordinates: 7.316944°S 109.361944°E
- Country: Indonesia
- Province: Central Java
- Regency: Purbalingga Regency
- Seat: Mangunegara

Area
  - Total: 51.43 km^{2} (19.86 sq mi)

Population (mid 2024 estimate)
  - Total: 81,443
- Time zone: UTC+7 (WIB)

Mrebet is a town and administrative district (kecamatan) in Purbalingga Regency, Central Java, Indonesia. Its administrative center is in the town of Mangunegara

== Geography ==
Mrebet District is bordered by Karangreja District to the north, Bobotsari District and Karanganyar District to the east, Bojongsari District and Kaligondang District to the south and Bojongsari District to the west.

=== Villages ===
Mrebet district comprises 19 villages

- Binangun
- Bojong
- Campakoah
- Cipaku
- Karang Nangka
- Karangturi
- Kradenan
- Lambur
- Mangunegara
- Mrebet
- Onje
- Pager Andong
- Pengalusan
- Sangkanayu
- Selaganggeng
- Serayu Karanganyar
- Serayu Larangan
- Sindang
- Tangkisan
