= Banyumasan people =

Ethnic group in Indonesia

Banyumasan
Orang Jawa Banyumasan ꦮꦺꦴꦁꦨꦚꦸꦩꦱꦤ꧀ Wòng Banyumasan / Tiyang Toyåjênéan / Priyantun Toyåjênéan
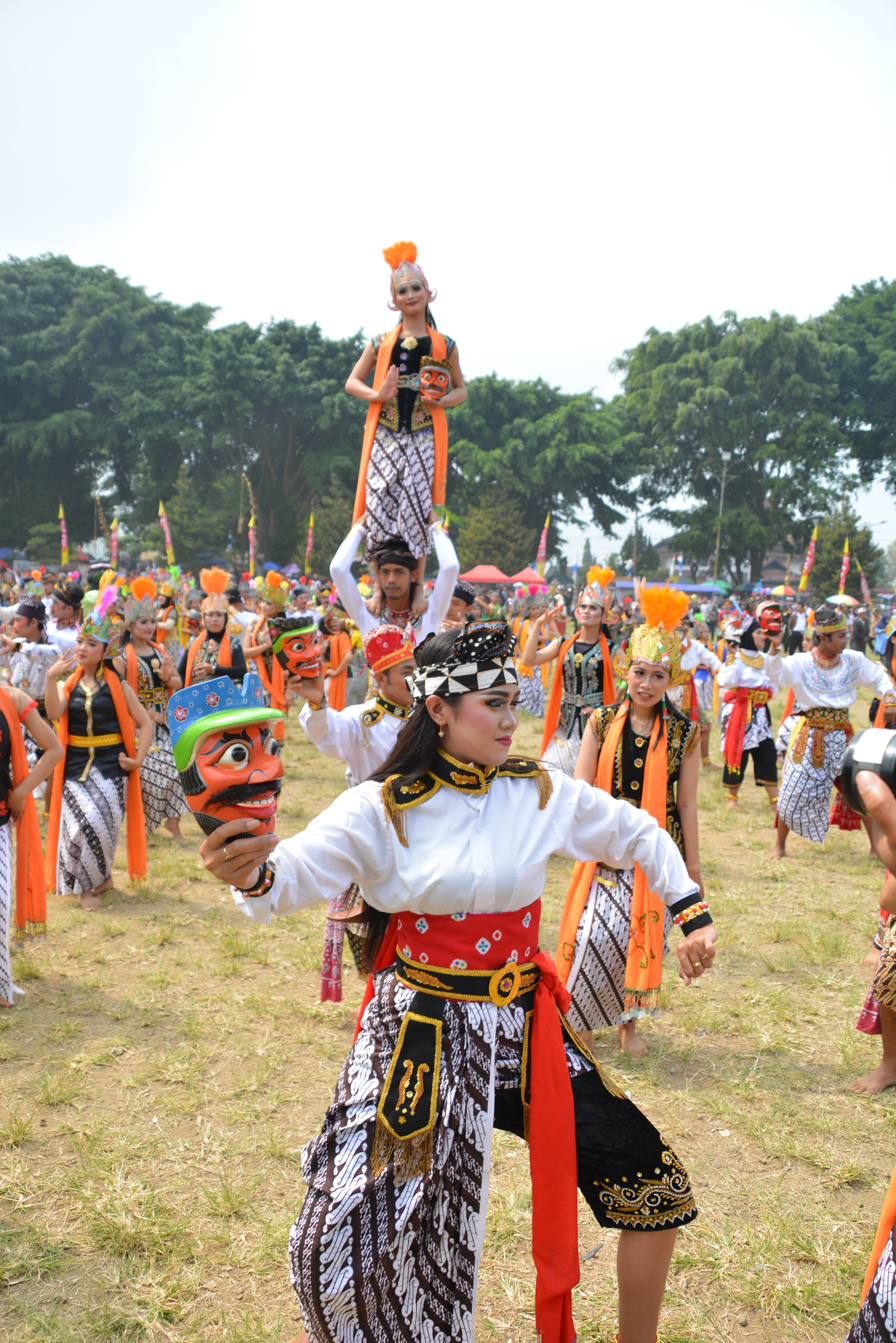
- Lengger dance from Banyumas

Total population
- 9,140,000

Regions with significant populations
- Indonesia (Western part of Central Java)

Languages
- Native: Javanese (Banyumasan dialect); Old Javanese (used in rituals); Other: - Indonesian

Religion
- Predominantly Sunni Islam (97,5%); Minority Christianity (Protestant and Catholic) (2,5%)

Related ethnic groups
- Other Javanese sub-ethnic groups such as: Cirebonese, Osing, Tenggerese, etc Sundanese

Banyumasan or Banyumasan Javanese (Javanese: Ngoko: ꦮꦺꦴꦁꦨꦚꦸꦩꦱꦤ꧀ (Wòng Banyumasan), Indonesian: Orang Banyumasan) (colloquially known as Javanese Ngapak) is a collective term for a Javanese subgroup native to the Indonesia's westernmost part of Central Java. At approximately ±9 million people, they are concentrated in Banyumas, Cilacap, Kebumen, Purworejo, Purbalingga, and Banjarnegara regencies. The Banyumasan-Javanese speak Banyumasan dialect of Javanese language, a dialect which is often called "basa ngapak-ngapak".

== History ==
=== Hindu-Buddhist kingdoms era ===
In the first era of Hindu-Buddhist in Indonesia, the Banyumasan region divided between Tarumanagara Kingdom's influence in the west and Kalingga Kingdom's influence in the east, with the Pemali River (Sundanese: Ci Pamali; Javanese: Kali Brebes, Kali Pemali) as natural borders. In the following period, the Banyumasan region was divided into two duchies, Pasirluhur in the west and Wirasaba in the east. Pasirluhur, which has Sundanese culture, acculturated with Wirasaba, which has Javanese culture in the east, so that today the influence of Sundanese toponymy can still be found, as well as the influence of other Sundanese cultures by the Banyumasan people. The other Hindu-Buddhist Kingdoms that influenced this region are Galuh Kingdom, Mataram kingdom, Kediri Kingdom, Singhasari Kingdom and Majapahit Empire. After the decline of Majapahit, Banyumasan region become part of Demak Sultanate.

=== End of Demak Sultanate until rise of Mataram ===
In Demak Sultanate era (1478–1546), Banyumasan region divided into several Kadipaten, which is Pasirluhur with its Adipati (Duke) Banyak Belanak, also Kadipaten Wirasaba with its Adipati Wargo Utomo I. Due to the territories extent of Demak Sultanate that make Sultan Trenggono (Third Sultan of Demak) consider that a strong military was needed, for that he divided Demak territories militarily into the area of military command. For Western region, Sultan Trenggono choose Adipati Banyak Belanak as a western territory military commander which includes region of Kerawang to Sumbing mountain (Wonosobo). As a military commander of Demak Sultanate, Adipati Pasirluhur was given a title Pangeran Senopati Mangkubumi I while his younger brother named Wirakencana became a Patih (General).

After the death of Sultan Trenggono, Demak Sultanate split into 3 sections, one of them is Pajang that ruled by Joko Tingkir with his title Sultan Adiwijaya (1546–1587). In this era, most of Banyumasan region become part of Pajang territory.

Following his predecessor's rule, Sultan Adiwijaya also choose Adipati Pasirluhur which at that time being held by Wirakencana, became Senopati Pajang with the title Pangeran Mangkubumi II. Meanwhile, the Adipati of Kadipaten Wirasaba, Wargo Utomo I died and one of his sons named R. Joko Kaiman was chosen by Sultan Adiwijaya became Adipati of Wirasaba with the title Wargo Utomo II, he became 7th Adipati of Wirasaba.

At the end of Pajang Kingdom's golden era and rise of Mataram Kingdom (1587), Adipati Wargo Utomo II gives his territory of Kadipaten Wirasaba to his brothers, meanwhile he himself created a new Kadipaten and named it Kadipaten Banyumas then he became first Adipati with the title Adipati Marapat.

And then, this Kadipaten of Banyumas growing rapidly, even after the center of this Kadipaten were transferred to Sudagaran - Banyumas, due to its influences, other Kadipatens became smaller. Along with the growing of Mataram Sultanate, Many Kadipatens in Banyumasan became under Mataram rule.

Mataram rule over Kadipatens in Banyumasan region did not automatically annex Banyumasan region into "inner circle" of Mataram power which makes Kadipatens in Banyumasan region still have autonomy and Mataram people also considered Banyumasan region as Måncånêgårå Kulòn region, and the people are often called Wòng (m)Banyumasan.

== Social structure ==
Banyumasan social structure have their own unique that which differs with the other Javanese because they had neighboring Sundanese (East Priangan) influence, even its root was still Javanese culture. This also related with the people's characteristic which was very egalitarian that do not recognized the term ningrat or priyayi. This was also reflected by their language Banyumasan language that did not recognised register social status. The use of high language (krama) essentially was loanwords due to their intensive interaction with other Javanese people in order to appreciate the outer culture. Honoring to the older person commonly to be shown by good attitude, affection, and manner.

Besides egalitarian, Banyumasan people also recognised by their honest and forthright characteristic which often called cablaka or blakasuta.

== Language ==
Javanese script

Banyumasan people speak Banyumasan language, a dialect (or variety?) of Javanese. The language were still retaining some of Old Javanese loanwords. Banyumasan did not replace the word "a" with "o" just like standard Javanese do. It is notable for its great number of nearly ubiquitous Sanskrit loans, found especially in literary Javanese. This is due to the long history of Hindu and Buddhist influences in Java.

Like other Javanese in Indonesia, most Banyumasan people are bilingual fluent in Indonesian and Banyumasan. In a public poll held circa-1990, approximately 12% of Javanese used Indonesian, around 18% used both Javanese and Indonesian, and the rest used Javanese exclusively.

In some areas especially in northern Cilacap and southern Brebes, Banyumasan people are able to speak Sundanese, due to the historical influence from the neighboring eastern Priangan region and the influx of Sundanese people migrated eastward and married the local people.

The Banyumasan language also commonly written with the a script descended from the Brahmi script, natively known as Hanacaraka or Carakan. Upon Indonesian independence it was replaced with a form of the Latin alphabet.

== Art ==
Banyumasan arts were spread almost throughout the region. The art itself commonly consists of folk performing arts which have certain functions that related to the people's lives with their creator. There is also another form of arts which is growing including:

Wayang Kulit Gragag Banyumasan is a form of wayang kulit in Banyumasan version. In this region also recognised two gragak or styles, which is Gragak Kidul Gunung and Gragak Lor Gunung. The specification of wayang kulit gragak Banyumasan is people's feel which is very thick with the show.

Bégalan, a traditional oral art which often used as part of a ceremonial wedding purpose, the property are often kitchen tools which every tools have their own symbolism that contains Javanese philosophy and useful for the bride and groom to create their own family.

=== Music ===
Banyumasan traditional music has clear distinct with the other Javanese music.

- Calung

A musical instrument which also commonly founded in Tatar Sunda (Sundaland) is made from bamboo snippets were transversely placed and played by being hit. This unique Banyumasan musical instrument is made of wulung bamboo that is similar to Javanese Gamelan, consists of gambang barung, gambang penerus, dhendhem, kenong, gong & kendang

- Kenthongan (also known as Tek-Tek)

Kentongan also made from bamboo. Kenthong is the most important tool, which made from bamboo snippets that elongated hole fed by its side and is played by being hit with a short wooden stick. Kenthongan were played by 20 persons equipped with Beduk, seruling, kecrek and led by majorette. In one group of kenthongan, Kenthong that used had several kinds used to produce harmonious sounds. The songs are sung mostly Javanese song and dangdut.

- Salawatan Jawa

One of musical arts with Islamic atmosphere with musical instrument terbang Jawa. In performing, this art sing the songs were adopted from Barzanji book.

=== Dance ===
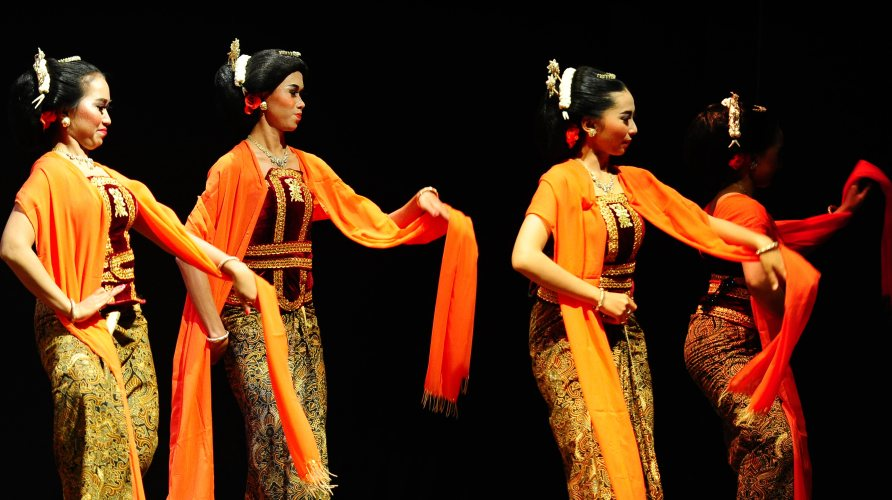
Banyumasan Lengger dance performance

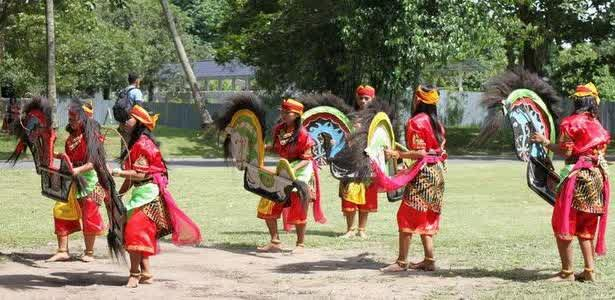
Ebeg or kuda lumping dance being performed

- Lengger is a kind of traditional dance that thrives in cultural Banyumasan region. This is commonly performed by two or more women. In the middle of this performance appears a male dancer, usually called badhud (clown), Lengger served in atop of a stage in the night or daylight, accompanied by a set of Calung instrument.
- Sintrén is a traditional art that were played by a male with feminine clothes. Usually this art often stick with ébég. In the middle of ébég perform, the player do a ritual called mendem or trance, then one of the players mendem badan, and then be pressed with lesung and locked into a cage. In that cage he dress up like a woman and dancing along - together with the other players. In some cases, that player do a thole-thole, that means the dancer bring a tampah and going around the arena looking for donation from the viewers.
- Akasimuda is an art with Islamic atmosphere that serces in a form of Pencak Silat actions which mixed with the dances.
- Angguk is an art with Islamic atmosphere and served in a dances form. Played by eight persons. At the end of the show the players doing Trance.
- Aplang or Daeng, an art that similar with Angguk, the dancers are female teenagers.
- Bongkél, Traditional musical instrument similar to Angklung, only consists one Instrument with four blades barreled slendro, with tone 2, 3, 5, 6. In Bongkel perform art are served gendhing - gendhing only for bongkel.
- Buncis is a blend between music arts & dance arts that served by eight players. In the show accompanied with Angklung instrument. The Buncis players besides from dancing they also become musician & vocalist. In the end of the show the Buncis players doung mendem.
- Ébég is a form of traditional dance unique to Banyumasan with Propherty kuda kepang. This art tells about valor of Prajurit Jaranan (knight) with their actions. Usually this performing art equipped with barongan, penthul & cépét. In ebeg performing accompanied with gamelan which usually called bandhe. This art were similar to others Jaran lumping in other regions. The performances often evoke a trance-like state among the dancers, which is believed to connect them to the spiritual realm, emphasizing the mystical and ceremonial significance of the art.

== Notable persons ==
- Ahmad Tohari
- Dading Kalbuadi
- Ebiet G. Ade
- Gatot Subroto
- Otto Soemarwoto
- Prabowo Subianto
- Richard Sam Bera
- Slamet Gundono
- Sudirman
- Tontowi Ahmad

== See also ==
- Baturaden
- Curug Cipendok
