= Curug Cipendok =

Waterfall tourism in Indonesia

- Cipendok Waterfall
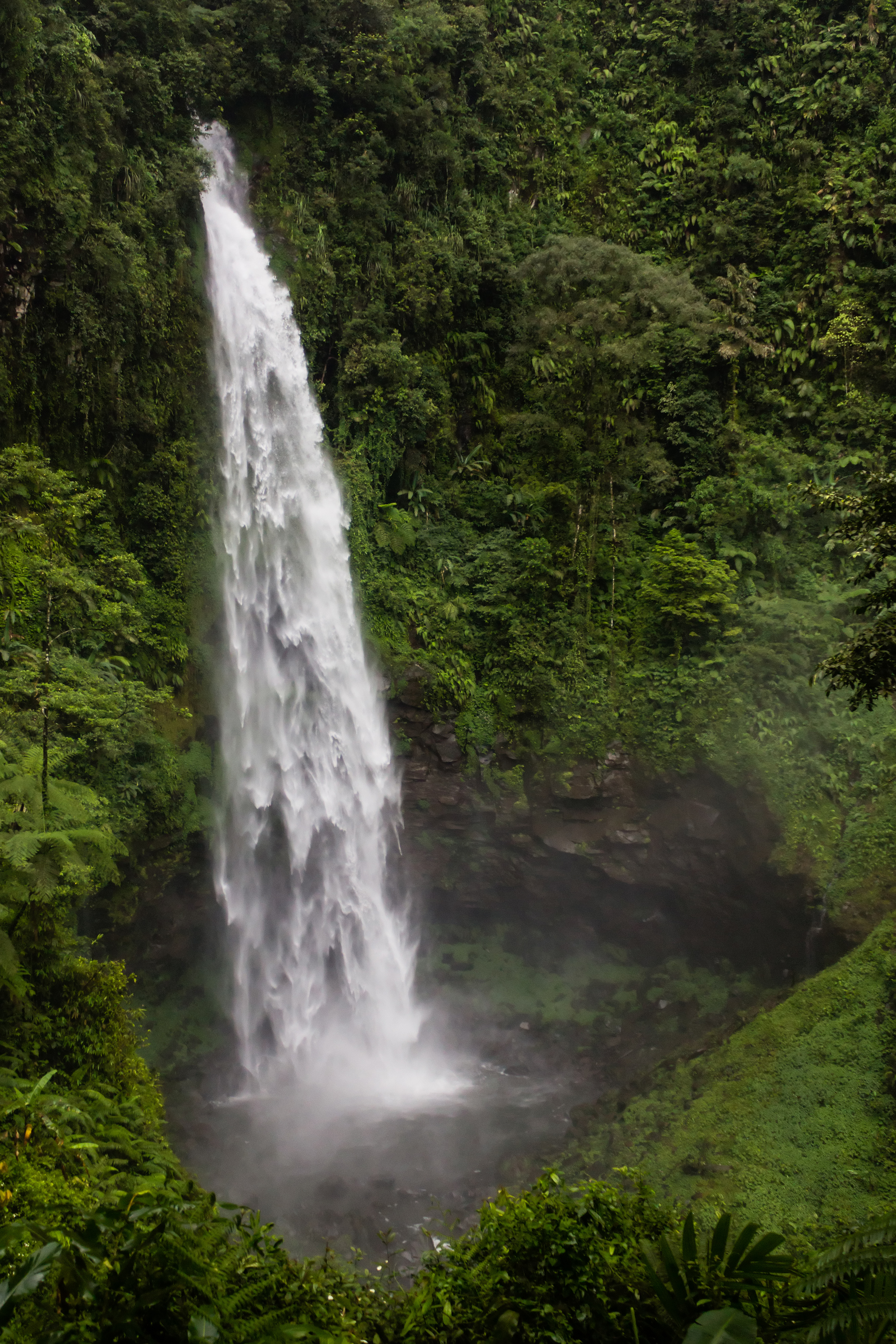
- Curug Cipendok, 2015

- Location within Indonesia
- Location: Karang Tengah, Cilongok Banyumas, Central Java
- Coordinates: 7°20′22″S 109°08′04″E
- Type: Segmented Plunges
- Total height: 92 m (302 ft)

Curug Cipendok is a waterfall in the southern part of Central Java. It is in Cilongok Banyumas (district), near the village of Karang Tengah, about 25 km (16 mi) from Purwokerto. The dramatic 92-metre (302 ft) falls are considered a major attraction and are very popular with tourists. The area also hosts a campsite and a large lake. The waterfall is 500 metres (1,600 ft) away from a parking area, through a tropical forest.

The depth reaches 25 metres (82 ft), with temperatures below 20 °C (68 °F).

The road to the waterfall is lined with celery plantations and stalls selling tempeh, pure milk, tomatoes, and peppers. In addition, many small rivers run along the road.

== Butterfly park ==
The village of Losari is around 8 kilometres (5.0 mi) from the waterfall. The road from Losari goes through a protected area which has a butterfly park, rare plants, Javan hawk-eagles, monkeys, Javanese tigers, and snakes.

Between July 2009 to August 2010, research students from the Faculty of Biology at Jenderal Soedirman University discovered 99 new species of butterflies and some species of orchids that exist only in the Cipendok area.

== History ==
After the Java War, the Dutch colonial government commissioned Ajibarang R. Ranusentika to clear the forest on the slopes. He often went fishing in a waterfall, under which there is a niche or a deep pool. During one of those fishing sessions, Ranusentika felt the tip of the hook pulled by a fish that was big, but when the end of the hook is retrieved, there was no big fish, but a pendok, or yellow gold dagger sheath, that caught the eye of the hook. Since then, the waterfall is named Cipendok. Curug Cipendok was restored and opened to the public in 1984.

Cipendok waterfall is at a plateau in the Banyumas region and was officially opened to the public on February 27, 1986. North of Cipendok lies the largest mountain forest in Java.

== See also ==
- List of waterfalls
