= Purbalingga =

- Regency capital

Other transcription(s)
  - Javanese: ꦥꦸꦂꦧꦭꦶꦁꦒ
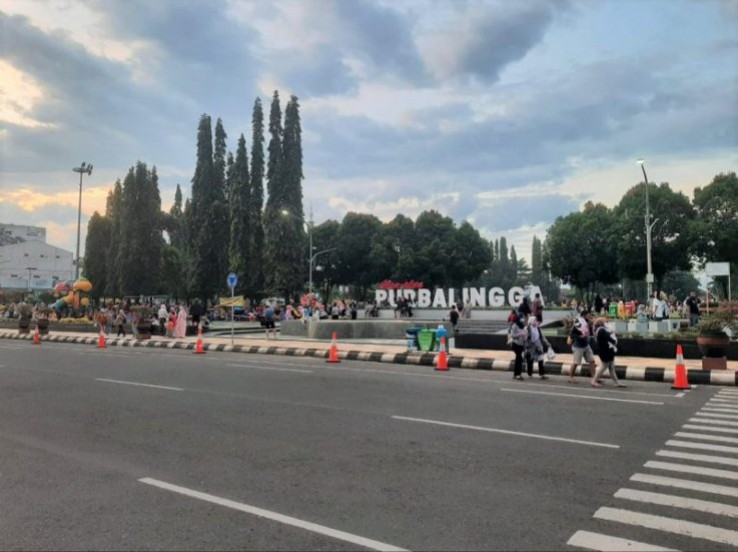
- Alun-alun Purbalingga

- Location within Indonesia
- Coordinates: 7°23′25″S 109°21′40″E
- Country: Indonesia
- Province: Central Java
- Regency: Purbalingga Regency

Area
  - Total: 15.66 km^{2} (6.05 sq mi)
- Elevation: 144 m (472 ft)

Population (mid 2025 estimate)
  - Total: 57,308
- Time zone: UTC+7 (WIB)
- Area code: 0281
- Website: purbalinggakab.go.id

Purbalingga (Indonesian pronunciation: [pʊrbaˈliŋɡa]; Javanese script: ꦥꦸꦂꦧꦭꦶꦁꦒ) is a town and district in Central Java Province of Indonesia and the seat of Purbalingga Regency.

== Villages ==
The district includes 11 urban villages (kelurahan) and 2 rural villages (desa) - the latter being Toyareja and Jatisaba in the east of the district. The populations of these 13 villages according to the official estimates as of mid-2021 were as follows:

- Bojong (4,908)
- Toyareja (3,229)
- Kedung Menjangan (3,948)
- Jatisaba (5,062)
- Bascar (4,813)
- Purbalingga Wetam (5,854)
- Penambongan (3,015)
- Purbalingga Kidul (2,657)
- Kandang Gampang (6,270)
- Purbalingga Kulon (4,778)
- Purbalingga Lor (7,479)
- Kembaran Kulon (2,905)
- Wirasana (3,611)

The kelurahan of Karangsentul (in neighbouring Padamara District) and the kelurahan of Kalikabong, Karangmanyar and Mewek (in neighbouring Kalimanah District) are adjacent to the town of Purbalingga and serve as suburbs to the town.

== Gallery ==
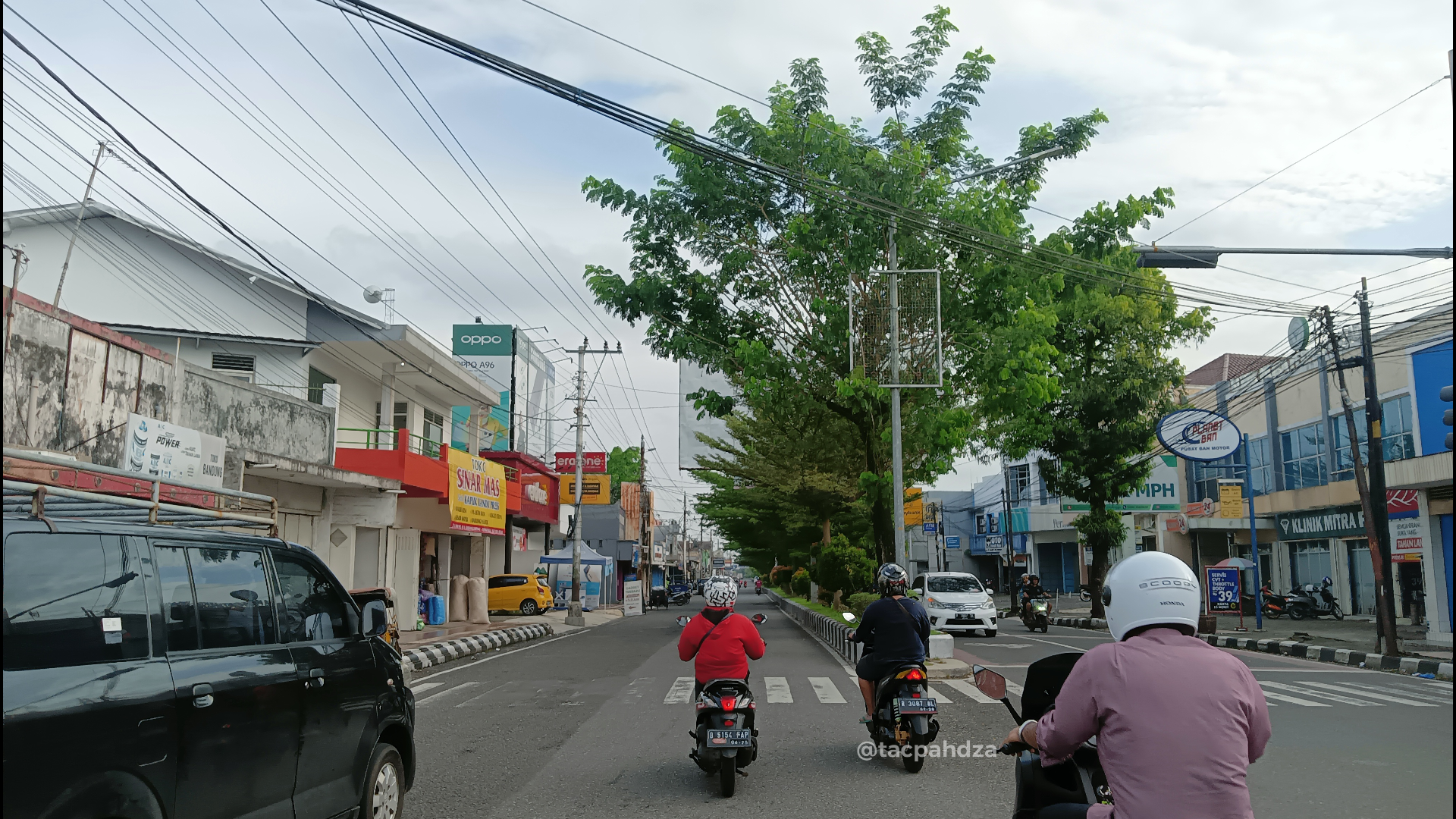
Ahmad Yani Rd, Purbalingga

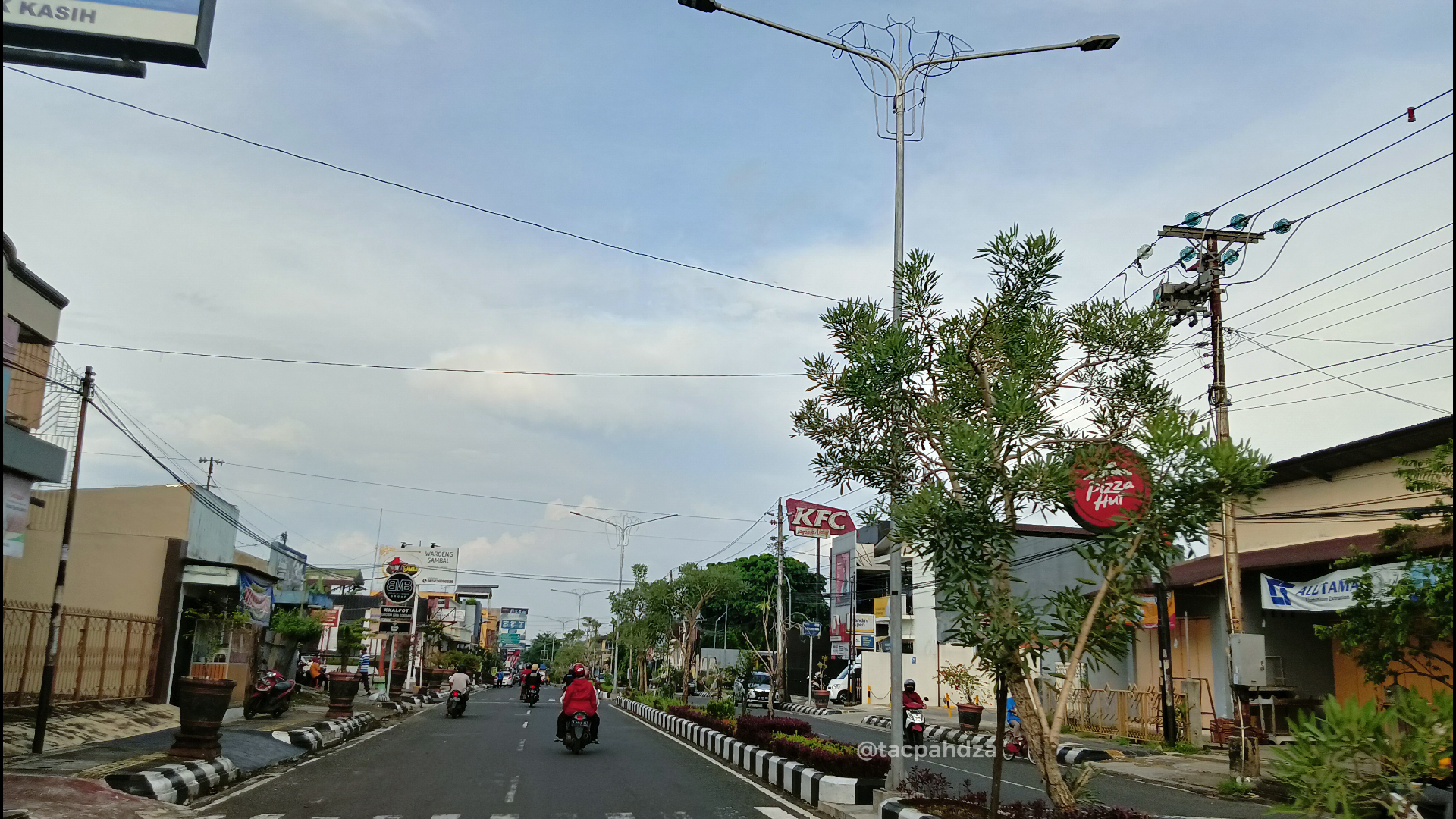
MT Haryono Rd, Purbalingga

== Climate ==
Purbalingga has a tropical rainforest climate (Af) with moderate rainfall from July to September and heavy to very heavy rainfall from October to June. The following climate data is for the town of Purbalingga.

Climate data for Purbalingga
Month	Jan	Feb	Mar	Apr	May	Jun	Jul	Aug	Sep	Oct	Nov	Dec	Year
Mean daily maximum °C (°F)	30.9 (87.6)	31.1 (88.0)	31.3 (88.3)	31.4 (88.5)	31.1 (88.0)	30.6 (87.1)	30.1 (86.2)	30.4 (86.7)	30.9 (87.6)	31.4 (88.5)	31.0 (87.8)	30.9 (87.6)	30.9 (87.7)
Daily mean °C (°F)	26.6 (79.9)	26.7 (80.1)	26.9 (80.4)	27.1 (80.8)	26.8 (80.2)	25.9 (78.6)	25.2 (77.4)	25.4 (77.7)	26.0 (78.8)	26.6 (79.9)	26.7 (80.1)	26.7 (80.1)	26.4 (79.5)
Mean daily minimum °C (°F)	22.3 (72.1)	22.4 (72.3)	22.6 (72.7)	22.8 (73.0)	22.5 (72.5)	21.3 (70.3)	20.4 (68.7)	20.5 (68.9)	21.1 (70.0)	21.8 (71.2)	22.5 (72.5)	22.5 (72.5)	21.9 (71.4)
Average rainfall mm (inches)	389 (15.3)	341 (13.4)	406 (16.0)	297 (11.7)	230 (9.1)	139 (5.5)	81 (3.2)	83 (3.3)	124 (4.9)	319 (12.6)	402 (15.8)	427 (16.8)	3,238 (127.6)
Source: Climate-Data.org
