= Purbalingga Regency =

Regency in Central Java, Indonesia

Purbalingga Regency Kabupaten Purbalingga
- Regency

Other transcription(s)
  - Javanese: ꦥꦸꦂꦧꦭꦶꦁꦒ
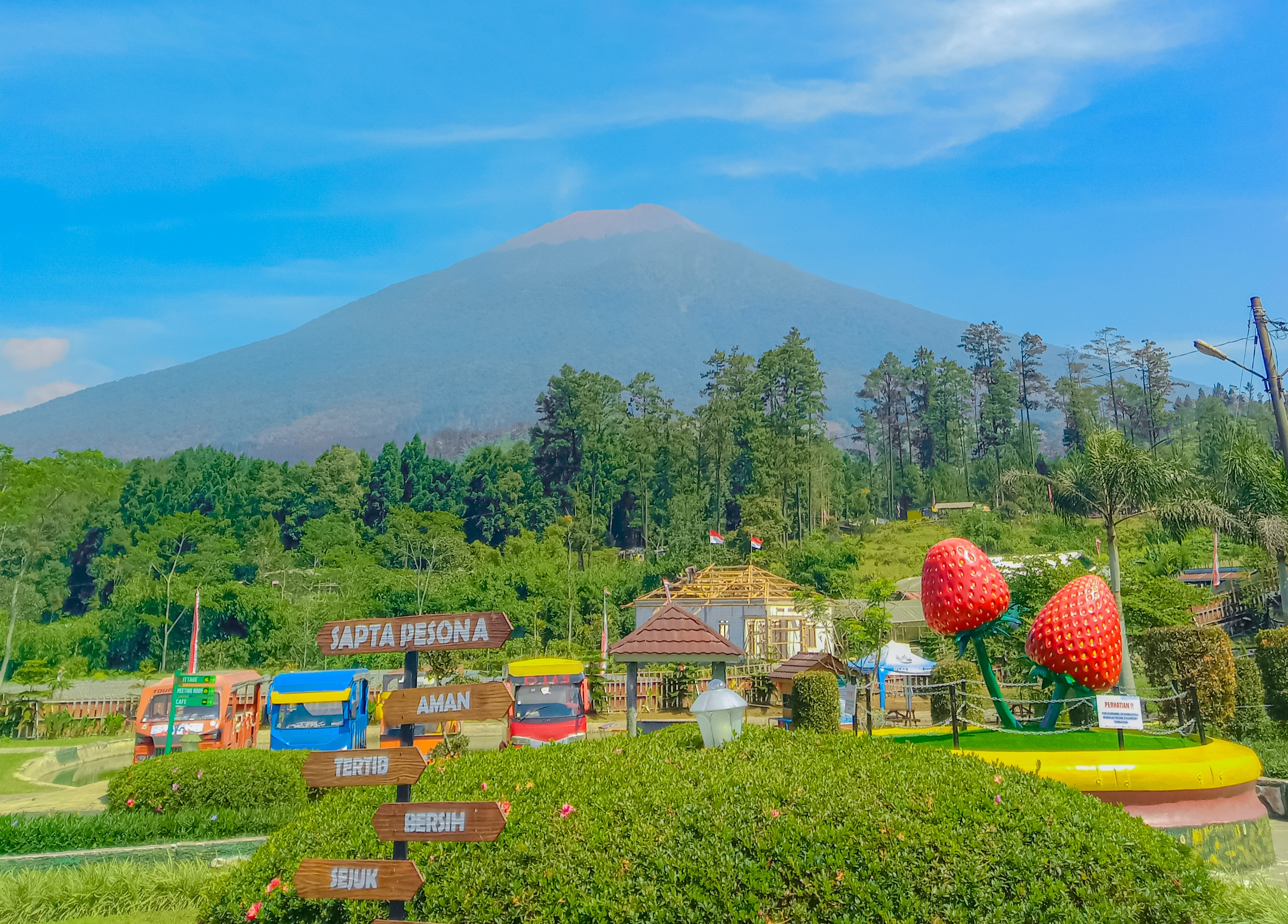
- Panorama of Mount Slamet from the Lembah Asri valley

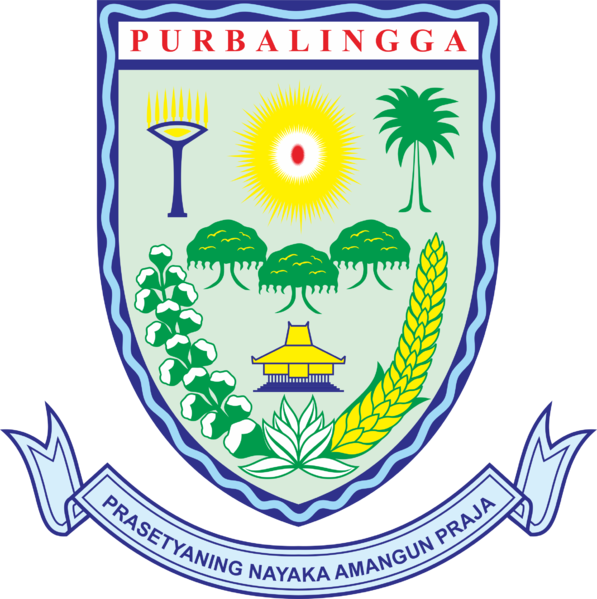
- Coat of arms
- Nickname: Kota Perwira
- Motto: Prasetyaning Nayaka Amangun Praja
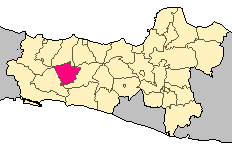
- Location of Purbalingga Regency in Central Java

- Location in Java Location in Indonesia
- Coordinates: 7°17′0″S 109°21′0″E
- Country: Indonesia
- Province: Central Java
- Capital: Purbalingga

Government
  - Regent: Fahmi Muhammad Hanif
  - Vice Regent: Dimas Prasetyahani

Area
  - Total: 805.76 km^{2} (311.11 sq mi)

Population (mid 2025 estimate)
  - Total: 1,057,643
  - Density: 1,312.6/km^{2} (3,399.6/sq mi)
- Time zone: UTC+7 (WIB)
- Postal code: 53300
- Area code: +62 281
- Website: purbalinggakab.go.id

Purbalingga Regency (Indonesian: Kabupaten Purbalingga, pronounced [kabuˌpat̪ɛn pʊrbaˈliŋɡa]; Javanese: Kabupatèn Purbalingga) is an inland regency (kabupaten) in the southwestern part of Central Java province in Indonesia. Purbalingga Regency has an area of 805.76 km^{2} and a population of 848,952 at the 2010 census and 998,561 at the 2020 census; the official estimate as at mid 2025 was 1,057,643 (comprising 534,876 male and 522,767 female inhabitants). The administrative capital is the town of Purbalingga.

== Etymology ==
The term Purbalinga comes from the Sanskrit root words of Hindu origin, purba (east) and linga (an abstract representation of the Hindu deity Lord Shiva), thus meaning the Lord Shiva of East. This reflects the historical origin of the place that the Srivijaya-era or earlier founders of the place had built a Hindu temple of Lord Shiva here in whose honor the place was named by the founder ruling dynasty.

== History ==
Purbalingga is steeped in the ancient history of the Hindu empires of the Srivijaya and Majapahit eras, with several extant ancient Hindu temples scattered in and around the regency:

- in Tegal Regency
  - Pura Caraka Dewa, Margo Padang, Tarub, Tegal.
  - Pura Segara Suci, Jalan Timor Timur, Martologo, Tegal.
- Nearby in Cirebon Regency
  - Pura Agung Jati Permana, Jalan Bali, No. 4, Cirebon.
  - Pura Jati Permana, Desa Larangan, Rt 3/4, Harjomukti, Cirebon.
  - Pura Jati Pramana, Jalan Ciremai Raya, Cirebon.

== Administrative districts ==
Purbalingga Regency comprises eighteen districts (kecamatan), tabulated below with their areas and their populations at the 2010 census and the 2020 census, together with the official estimates as of mid 2025. The table also includes the locations of the district administrative centres, the number of administrative villages in each district (a total of 224 rural desa and 15 urban kelurahan - the latter consists of 11 villages in Purlalingga (town) District, 3 in Kalimanah District and 1 in Padamara District), together with its postcode.

| Kode Wilayah | Name of District (kecamatan) | Area in km^{2} | Pop'n 2010 census | Pop'n 2020 census | Pop'n mid 2025 estimate | Admin centre | No. of Villages | Post code |
|---|---|---|---|---|---|---|---|---|
| 33.03.01 | Kemangkon | 48.46 | 52,260 | 63,622 | 68,486 | Panican | 19 | 53381 |
| 33.03.02 | Bukateja | 44.96 | 65,381 | 78,114 | 83,323 | Bukateja | 14 | 53382 |
| 33.03.03 | Kejobong | 40.14 | 42,237 | 50,738 | 54,265 | Kejobong | 13 | 53392 ^{(a)} |
| 33.03.16 | Pengadegan | 41.25 | 35,249 | 41,046 | 43,243 | Pengadegan | 9 | 53393 |
| 33.03.04 | Kaligondang | 51.44 | 55,343 | 65,548 | 69,626 | Kaligondang | 18 | 53391 ^{(b)} |
| 33.03.05 | Purbalingga (capital town) | 15.66 | 55,615 | 57,580 | 57,308 | Penambongan | 13 ^{(c)} | 53311 -53319 |
| 33.03.06 | Kalimanah | 23.24 | 49,347 | 57,667 | 60,859 | Selabaya | 17 ^{(d)} | 53371 ^{(e)} |
| 33.03.15 | Padamara | 17.90 | 38,698 | 46,533 | 49,792 | Padamara | 14 ^{(f)} | 53372 |
| 33.03.07 | Kutasari | 37.81 | 54,278 | 65,235 | 69,787 | Kutasari | 14 | 53361 |
| 33.03.14 | Bojongsari | 44.99 | 54,874 | 64,147 | 66,067 | Bojongsari | 13 | 53362 |
| 33.03.08 | Mrebet | 51.43 | 65,042 | 77,869 | 83,146 | Mangunegara | 19 | 53352 |
| 33.03.09 | Bobotsari | 35.54 | 46,593 | 53,319 | 55,702 | Bobotsari | 16 | 53353 |
| 33.03.10 | Karangreja | 62.01 | 39,092 | 46,640 | 49,717 | Karangreja | 7 | 53358 |
| 33.03.17 | Karangjambu | 48.95 | 23,422 | 28,078 | 30,000 | Karangjambu | 6 | 53357 |
| 33.03.11 | Karanganyar | 35.21 | 34,171 | 40,091 | 42,391 | Karanganyar | 13 | 53354 |
| 33.03.18 | Kertanegara | 36.01 | 30,177 | 36,926 | 39,847 | Kertanegara | 11 | 53351 |
| 33.03.12 | Karangmoncol | 71.98 | 49,790 | 58,543 | 61,967 | Pekiringan | 11 | 53355 |
| 33.03.13 | Rembang | 98.79 | 57,385 | 67,917 | 72,117 | Bantarbarang | 12 | 53356 |
| | Totals | 805.76 | 848,952 | 998,561 | 1,057,643 | Purbalingga | 239 | |

Notes: (a) except the village of Timbang, which has a post code of 53314.
(b) except the village of Penaruban, which has a post code of 53331.
(c) comprises 11 classed as kelurahan (Bancar, Bojong, Kandang Gampang, Kedung Menjangan, Kembaran Kulon, Penambongan, Purbalingga Kidul, Purbalingga Kulon, Purbalingga Lor, Purbalingga Wetan and Wirasana) and 2 as desa.
(d) comprises 3 kelurihan (Kalikabong, Karangmanyar and Mewek) and 14 desa. (e) except the village of Kalikabong, which has a post code of 53321. (f) includes one kelurahan (Karangsentul).

== Gallery ==
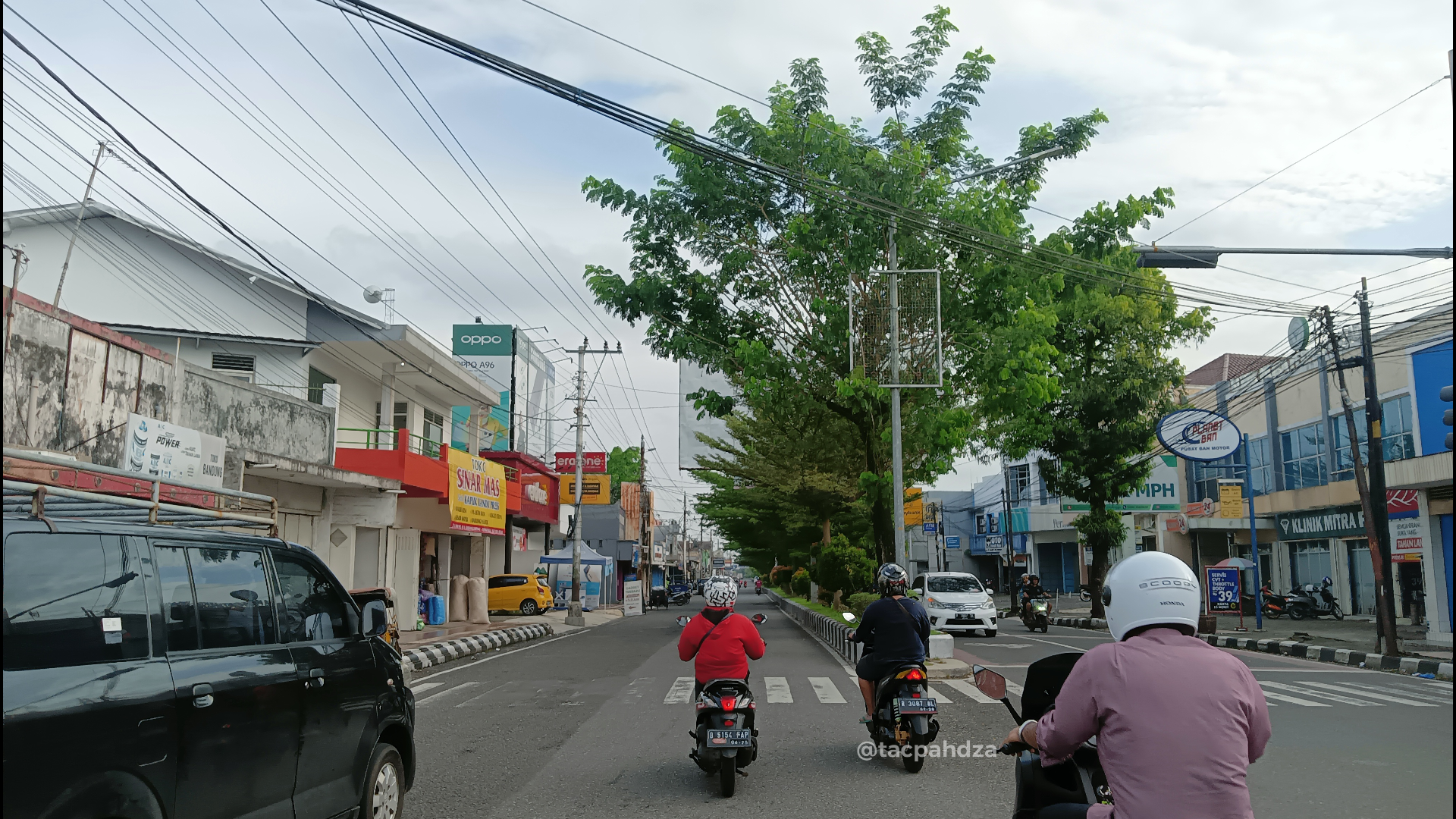
Ahmad Yani Rd, Purbalingga

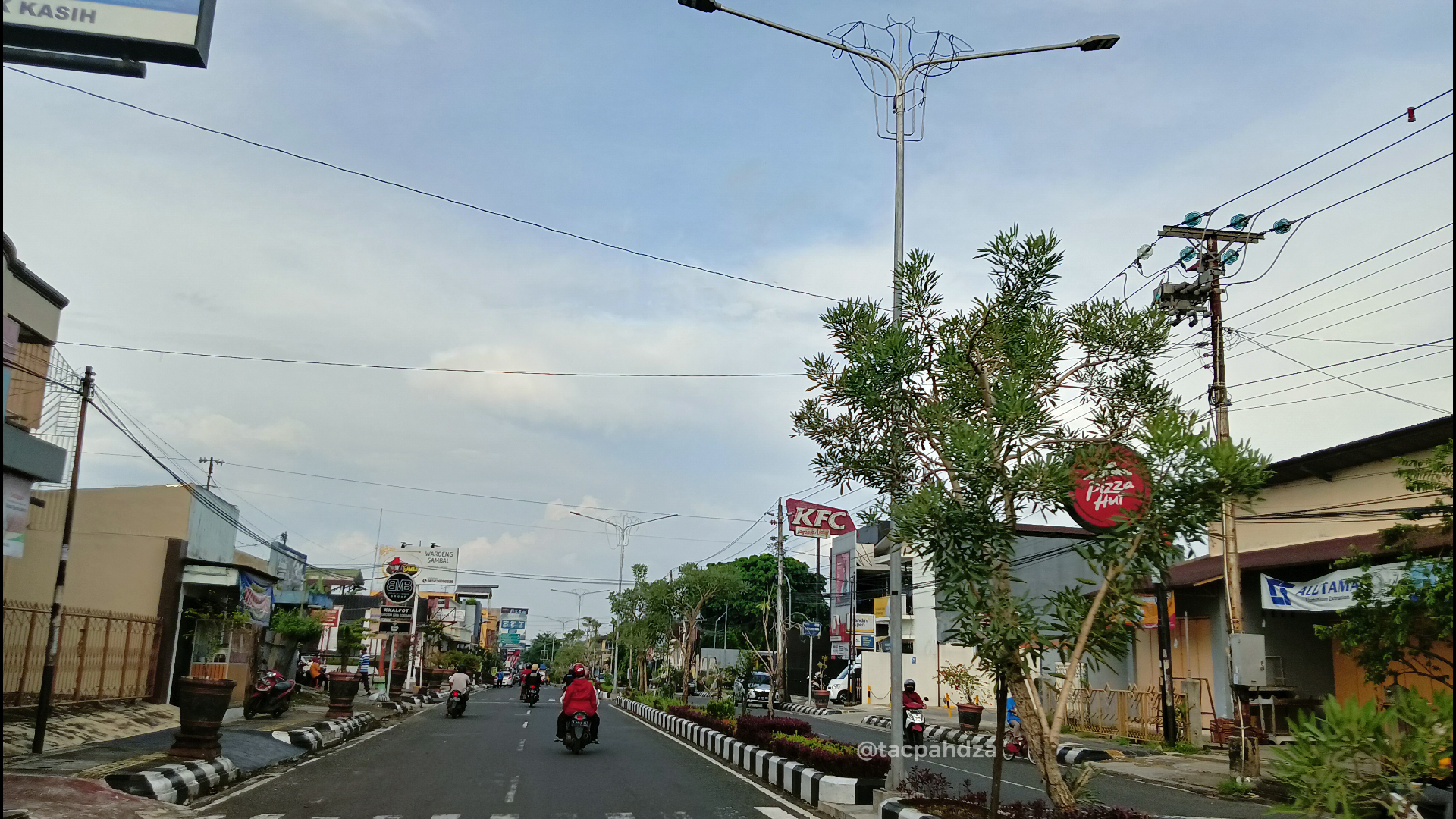
MT Haryono Rd, Purbalingga

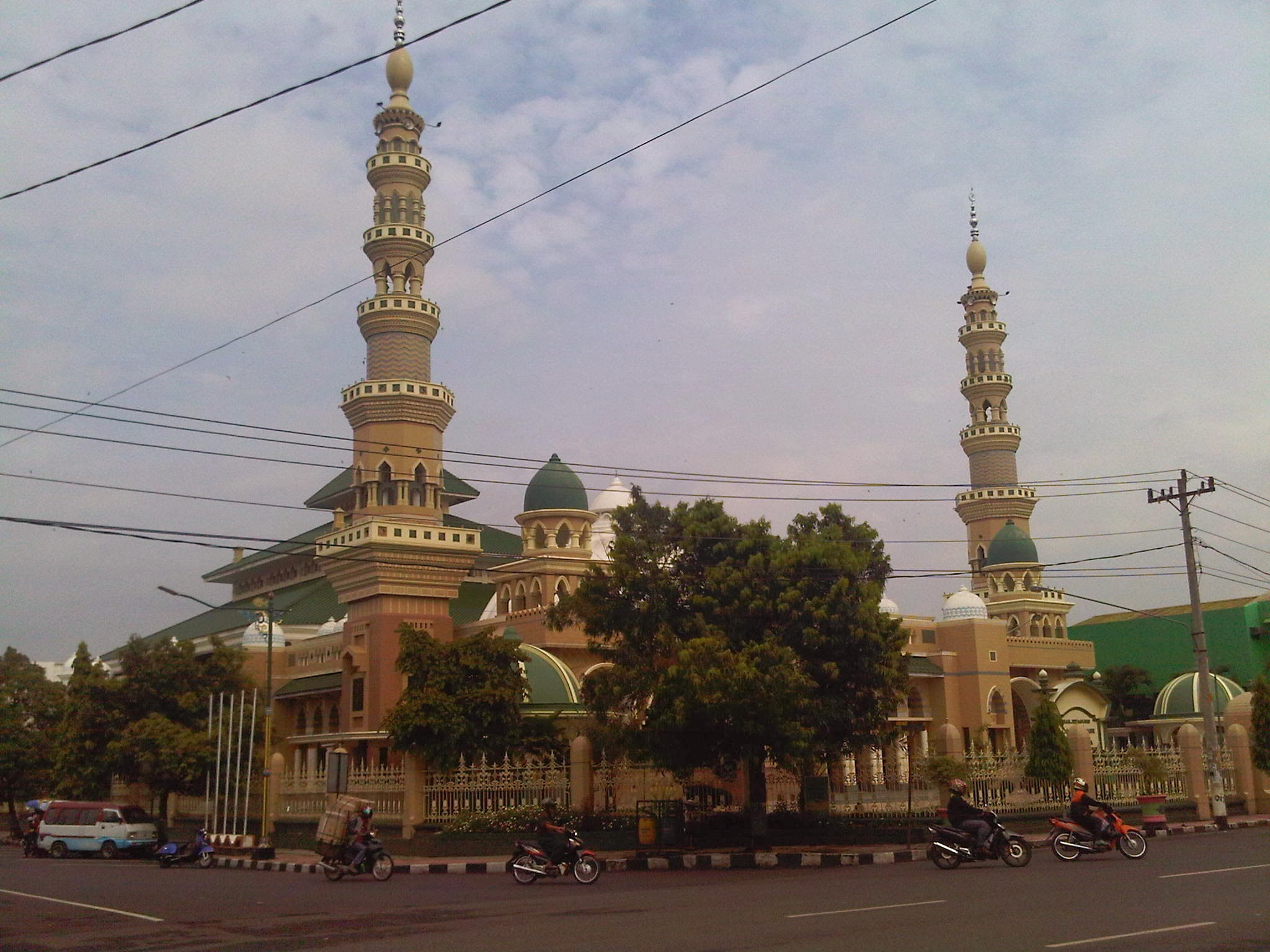
Great Mosque of Purbalingga

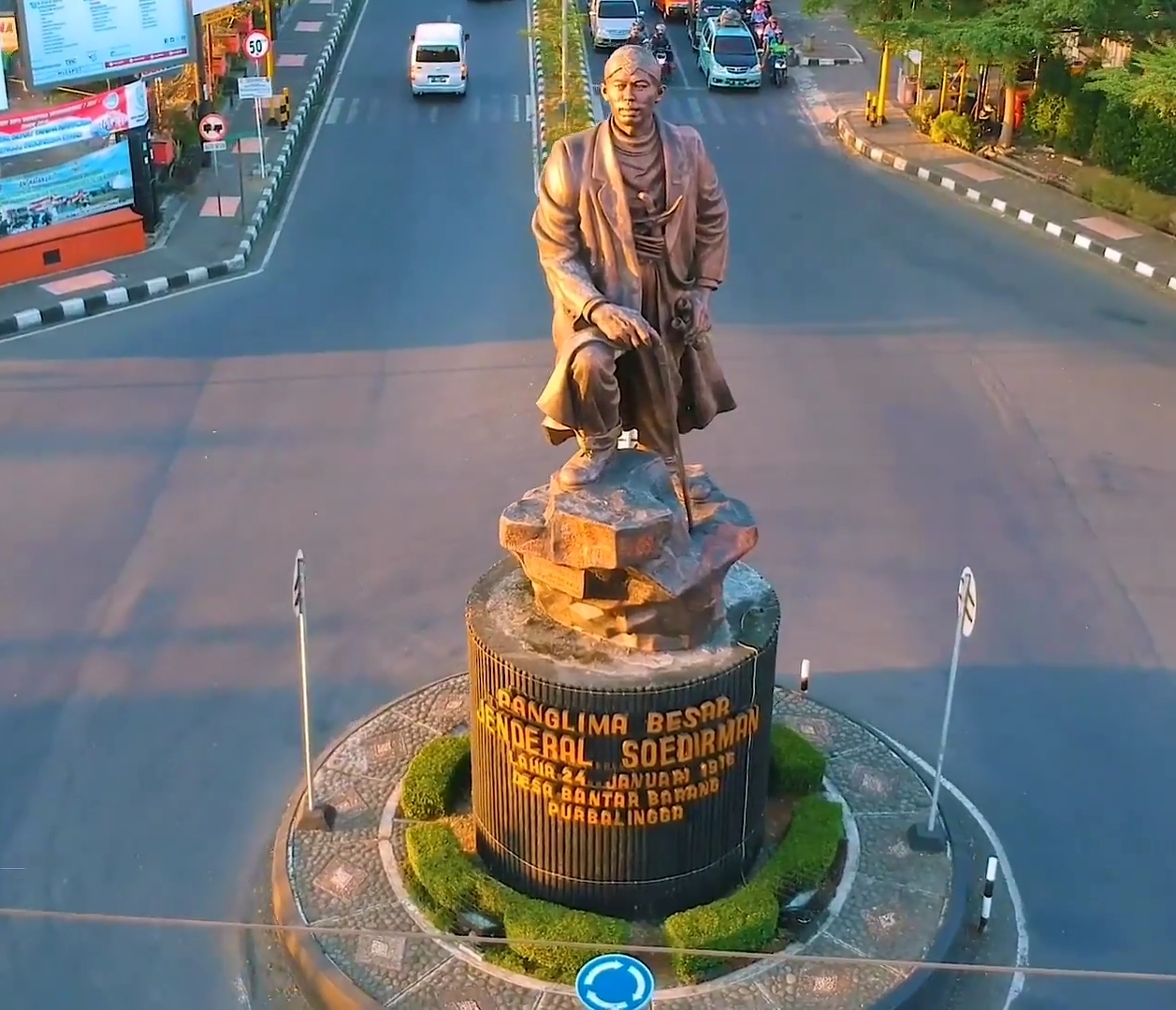
Statue of general Sudirman at Purbalingga

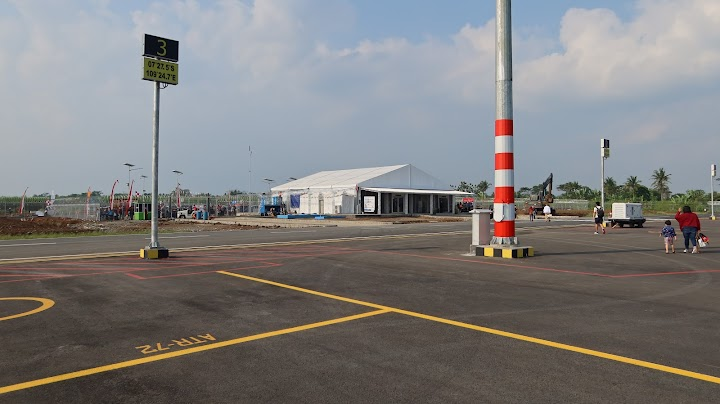
Runaway at Jenderal Besar Soedirman airport

== Climate ==
Purbalingga Regency has a tropical rainforest climate (Af) with moderate rainfall from July to September and heavy to very heavy rainfall from October to June. The following climate data is for the town of Purbalingga.

Climate data for Purbalingga
| Month | Jan | Feb | Mar | Apr | May | Jun | Jul | Aug | Sep | Oct | Nov | Dec | Year |
|---|---|---|---|---|---|---|---|---|---|---|---|---|---|
| Mean daily maximum °C (°F) | 30.9 (87.6) | 31.1 (88.0) | 31.3 (88.3) | 31.4 (88.5) | 31.1 (88.0) | 30.6 (87.1) | 30.1 (86.2) | 30.4 (86.7) | 30.9 (87.6) | 31.4 (88.5) | 31.0 (87.8) | 30.9 (87.6) | 30.9 (87.7) |
| Daily mean °C (°F) | 26.6 (79.9) | 26.7 (80.1) | 26.9 (80.4) | 27.1 (80.8) | 26.8 (80.2) | 25.9 (78.6) | 25.2 (77.4) | 25.4 (77.7) | 26.0 (78.8) | 26.6 (79.9) | 26.7 (80.1) | 26.7 (80.1) | 26.4 (79.5) |
| Mean daily minimum °C (°F) | 22.3 (72.1) | 22.4 (72.3) | 22.6 (72.7) | 22.8 (73.0) | 22.5 (72.5) | 21.3 (70.3) | 20.4 (68.7) | 20.5 (68.9) | 21.1 (70.0) | 21.8 (71.2) | 22.5 (72.5) | 22.5 (72.5) | 21.9 (71.4) |
| Average rainfall mm (inches) | 389 (15.3) | 341 (13.4) | 406 (16.0) | 297 (11.7) | 230 (9.1) | 139 (5.5) | 81 (3.2) | 83 (3.3) | 124 (4.9) | 319 (12.6) | 402 (15.8) | 427 (16.8) | 3,238 (127.6) |
Source: Climate-Data.org

== Famous people ==
- Sudirman, General of the Army and the first commander-in-chief of the Indonesian Armed Forces - one of the most prominent national heroes of Indonesia - was born in Bodas Karangjati village, in the district of Rembang, Purbalingga Regency, on 24 January 1916.
- Indro (Warkop), (born 1958), Indonesian comedian and a member of the Indonesian legendary comedy group Warkop.
