= R. Achmad Rivai =

Indonesian admiral

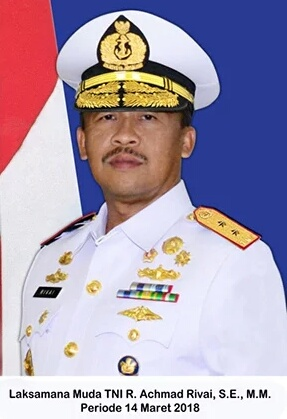
- Children: Randy Rivaldi; Amanda Risviandari
- Relatives: Dra. R. Ida Sundari
- Military career
- Allegiance: Indonesia
- Branch: Indonesian Navy
- Service years: 1988—2023
- Rank: Rear Admiral
- Commands: Senior Officer of Indonesian Navy
- Awards: See Awards

R. Achmad Rivai is a rear admiral in the Indonesian Navy who served as a senior officer (Indonesian: Perwira Tinggi) to the chief of staff of Kasal. The last position of this two-star general was TA Pengkaji Bid. National Defense System System.

== Career ==
He graduated from the AAL-33 TA Naval Academy in 1988. He has served various assignments both on warships and on staff.

His education and training also includes Korbantem (1990), Pikspespa/Artileri Angkatan 6 (1992/1993), Diklapa ll/Koum Angkatan 11 (1997/1998), Sekolah Staf dan Komando TNI Angkatan Laut (Seskoal) Angkatan 39 (2001), Sekolah Staf dan Komando (Sesko) TNI Angkatan 38 (2011) and Lemhannas Rl PPRA Angkatan ke-53 (2015).

Abdul Rasyid Kacong held the role in charge of finding the wreck of the Sriwijaya Air plane that crashed in the waters of the Thousand Islands, Jakarta. He led the Indonesian Navy forces with 10 ships at night in the search for Sriwijaya Air SJ182 on 9 January. He served as the commander of the Fleet Command I in the search for the Sriwijaya Air SJ182 plane that crashed on Laki Island, Sunday, 10 January 2021. A team of divers from the Indonesian Navy was also deployed in the search process. The Navy have prepared KRI Dishidros, who has the capability in conducting underwater searches.

== Awards ==
Satyalancana Seroja

Bintang Jalasena Nararya

Satyalancana Kesetiaan 24 years' service

Satyalancana Kesetiaan 16 years' service

Satyalancana Kesetiaan 8 years' service

Satyalancana Dwidya Sistha

Satyalancana Kebhaktian Sosial

Satyalancana Dharma Nusa

Satyalancana Wira Dharma

Satyalancana Wira Nusa

== Position ==
- Marine Weapons Division (Padiv) Officer KRI Badik (1990)
- Head of Ops KRI Mandau
- Palaksa KRI Tjiptadi
- Palaksa KRI Badik
- Commander of KRI Sura
- Commander Lanal Nunukan (2006)
- Satkerbar Commander (2008)
- Armabar Strict Commander (2009)
- Asops Guskamlabar (2009)
- Paban l Strategic Plan Srena Headquarters (2011)
- Asops Pangarmabar (2013)
- Deputy Commander of Lantamal III Jakarta (2015)
- Commander Lantamai Il Padang (2016)
- Pankolinlamil (2018)
- TA Reviewer Bid. National Defense System System (2018)
- Special Staff of Kasal (2019)

== See also ==
- Indonesian military ranks
