= 1989 TAROM Antonov An-24 crash =

1989 aircraft shootdown in Romania

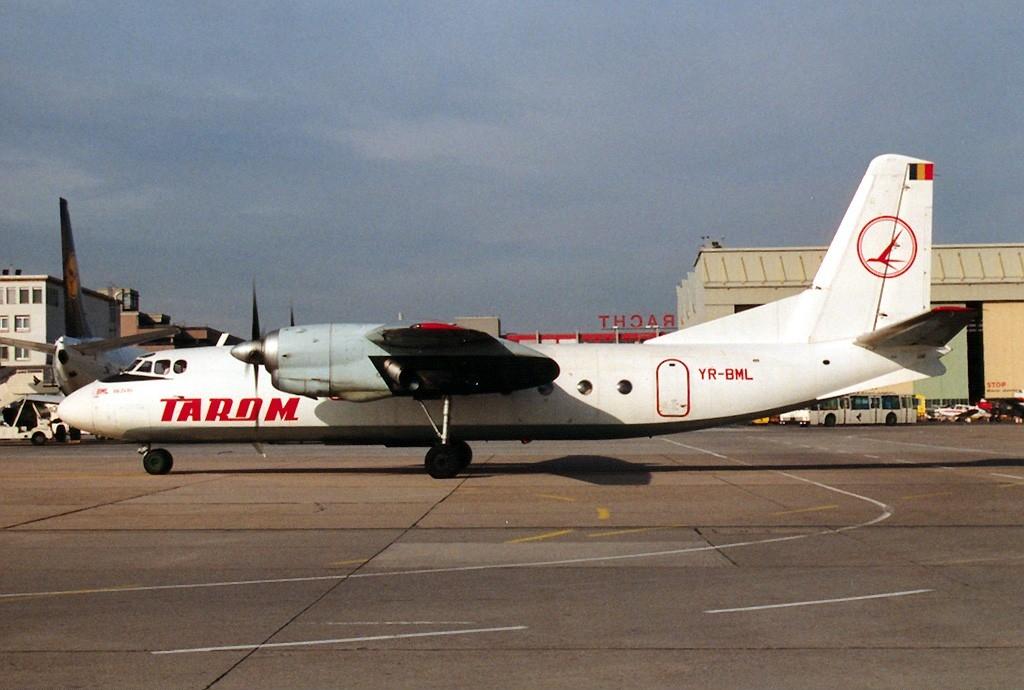
- A TAROM Antonov An-24, similar to the aircraft involved

Shootdown
- Date: 28 December 1989
- Summary: Impact with a foreign object, probably a missile fired upon the airplane
- Site: Near Vișina, Dâmbovița County, Romania; 44°34′32.3″N 25°21′28.6″E

Aircraft
- Aircraft type: Antonov An-24RV
- Operator: TAROM
- Registration: YR-BMJ
- Flight origin: Bucharest Henri Coandă International Airport, Ilfov County, Romania
- Destination: Belgrade International Airport, Belgrade, SFR Yugoslavia (today Serbia)
- Occupants: 7
- Passengers: 1
- Crew: 6
- Fatalities: 7
- Survivors: 0

On 28 December 1989, a TAROM Antonov An-24RV, operating an international cargo flight from Bucharest Henri Coandă International Airport, Romania, to Belgrade International Airport, Yugoslavia, crashed near Vișina, Dâmbovița County, Romania. All seven people on board the aircraft were killed. The official investigation stated that an impact with a foreign object, which damaged the aircraft's structural integrity and made it enter a dive, was what caused the crash. The object is believed to be a missile fired at the aircraft.

== Background ==
=== Political situation ===
Between December 16 and December 25, 1989, a revolution occurred in Romania, which led to the overthrow of president Nicolae Ceaușescu and his execution. Because of this military activity was ongoing in the country, including aviation-related ones, given also the fact that Ceausescu himself was trying to escape with a helicopter before being intercepted. This flight was the first taking off from Bucharest Henri Coandă International Airport after the revolution.

=== Aircraft ===
The aircraft involved was an Antonov An-24RV registered as YR-BMJ and manufactured in 1977. The aircraft was on a cargo flight to pick up blood in Belgrade, and then deliver it back to Bucharest, where the injured from the clashes in Romania were being treated.

=== Occupants ===
The aircraft was carrying a total of seven people, six crew members and a single passenger. The six crew members were 31-year-old pilot Valter Jurcovan, 38-year-old flight instructor Chifor Ioan, 35-year-old flight instructor commander Moldoveanu Mihai, 33-year-old flight mechanic Cirstea Gilu and two flight attendants, 35-year-old Marghidan Elena and 41-year-old Petre Banica. The single passenger was the British photographer and journalist Ian Parry, who was returning to the United Kingdom after documenting the Romanian Revolution.

== Incident ==
The aircraft was due to make a special cargo flight from Bucharest Henri Coandă International Airport, Romania, to Belgrade International Airport, Yugoslavia, to pick up blood supplies that were supposed to be brought back to treat the victims of the Romanian Revolution. The flight was supposed to be cargo only, but a single passenger was admitted on board at the last moment. The aircraft took off at 11:06 am EET, and the first part of the flight went uneventful. About 30 minutes after takeoff, as the airplane was flying near the town of Vișina, about 55 kilometers from Bucharest, it disappeared from radar. Local residents reported seeing a plane with a low attitude descending and emitting smoke from its rear, that impacted trees shortly after. The aircraft exploded on impact killing all seven people on board. The wreckage was spread on an area of a squared kilometer inside the Mălinoasa forest.

== Investigation ==
=== Romanian authorities ===
Romanian authorities were reluctant to investigate the crash, due to the possible political implications of it. Their first statement was released shortly after the incident, in which they attributed the crash to icing conditions, that caused the formation of ice crystals on the front of the aircraft, leading to a pitch down and a loss of control. This explanation was immediately criticised given the weather conditions present during the day of the crash in the area, which were not favorable to ice formation, and the fact that icing conditions usually affect the wings and not the nose of airplanes. In this first investigation the pilots of the aircraft were also blamed for having not taken the necessary actions to prevent the disaster. In 2006 a new inquiry stated that the crash was not the result of icing, but instead it was caused by the impact of a foreign object with the airplane's horizontal stabilizer. The impact weakened the aircraft structural integrity, and jammed the stabilizer in a position that put the aircraft into a dive, making it uncontrollable for the crew. The foreign object is believed to be a missile fired by the 182nd anti-aircraft missile division of the Romanian army, that was stationed in Boteni, Argeș County, only 12 kilometers from the crash site.

=== Intentional shootdown theory ===
An alternative theory, supported by former Romanian chief military prosecutor Dan Voinea in a documentary broadcast on Channel Four Wales, suggested that the shootdown was intentional and ordered by the Romanian government to avoid that the fourteen tapes, in which the Romanian Revolution was documented, that journalist Ian Parry was reportedly carrying in his luggage, reached foreign countries. According to the supporters of this theory the tapes that he had would "hurt the new regime" that was established in Romania, so they decided to silence him. Witnesses on the ground also reported that police and military officers were among the first to reach the crash site, and that they took away parts of the wreckage. There were also reports that, before boarding, at Bucharest airport, Romanian authorities attempted to take away Parry's luggage from him. The theory was criticised by many Romanian journalists and by Ian Parry's family. The critics of this theory stated that if Romanian authorities wanted to censor Parry it would have been more practical for them to arrest him before he left the country and that, even though a shootdown is the most probable cause of the incident, it was probably not deliberate, and may be the result of an isolated division that had not yet heard the order to reopen the national airspace.

== Aftermath ==
Documentaries were made on the crash including one from Romanian broadcaster Antena 3 CNN and one from the Welsh language channel Channel Four Wales, both of which investigate the incident and focus especially the intentional shootdown theory.

A memorial service for Ian Parry was held at St Bride's Church, London, about a month after the crash.

== See also ==
- List of airliner shootdown incidents
- Romanian Revolution
- 1985 Aeroflot Antonov An-12 shootdown, another cargo aircraft shot down
