= Autothrottle =

System that allows a pilot to control thrust without manually setting fuel flow

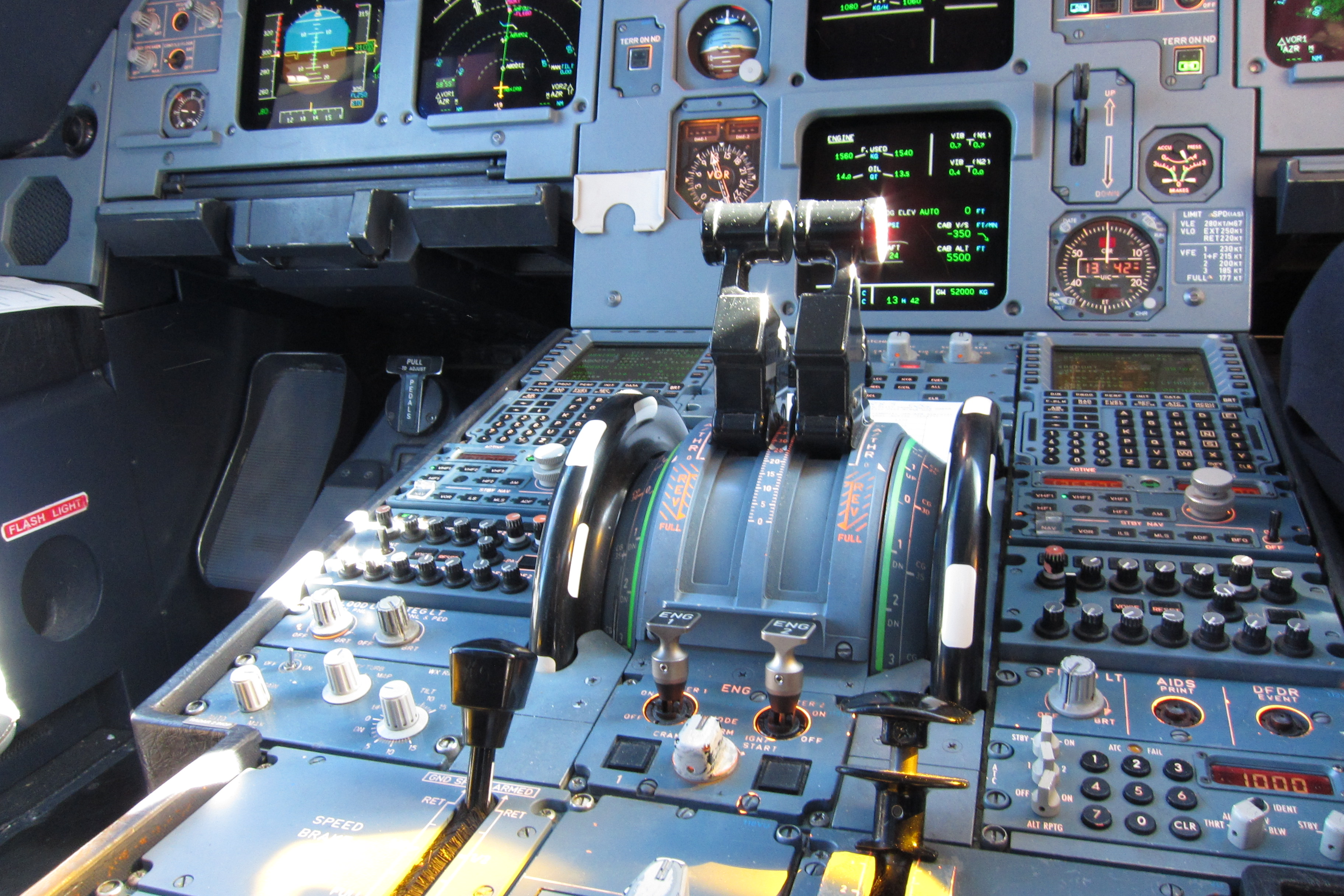
Thrust levers of an A320 set to the autothrust position during cruise flight

An autothrottle (automatic throttle; also known as autothrust, A/T, or A/THR) is a system that allows a pilot to control the power setting of an aircraft's engines by specifying a desired flight characteristic, rather than manually controlling the fuel flow. The autothrottle can greatly reduce the pilots' workload and help conserve fuel and extend engine life by metering the precise amount of fuel required to attain a specific target indicated air speed, or the assigned power for different phases of flight. A/T and AFDS (Auto Flight Director Systems) can work together to fulfill the whole flight plan.

== Working modes ==
There are two parameters that an A/T can maintain, or try to attain: speed and thrust.

In speed mode the throttle is positioned to attain a set target speed, subject to safe operating margins. For example, if the pilot selects a target speed which is slower than stall speed, the autothrottle system maintains a speed above the stall speed.

In the thrust mode the engine is maintained at a fixed power setting according to the different flight phases. For example, during takeoff, the A/T maintains constant takeoff power until takeoff mode is finished. During climb, the A/T maintains constant climb power; in descent, the A/T reduces the setting to the idle position, and so on. When the A/T is working in thrust mode, speed is controlled by pitch (or the control column), and not by the A/T. A radar altimeter feeds data to the autothrottle in this mode.

== Usage ==
On Boeing-type aircraft, A/T can be used in all flight phases from takeoff, climb, cruise, descent, approach, all the way to land or go-around, barring malfunction. Taxi is not considered a part of flight, and A/T does not work for taxiing. In most cases, A/T mode selection is automatic without the need of any manual selection unless interrupted by pilots.

According to Boeing-published flight procedures, A/T is engaged before the takeoff procedure and is automatically disconnected two seconds after landing. During flight, manual override of A/T is always available. A release of manual override allows A/T to regain control, and the throttle will go back to the A/T commanded position except for two modes (Boeing type aircraft): IDLE and THR HLD. In these two modes, the throttle will remain at the manual commanded position.

== History ==
A primitive autothrottle was first fitted to later versions of the Messerschmitt Me 262 jet fighter late in World War II. However, the first commercial airplane with this system (named AutoPower) was the DC-3 (since 1956). The first version was able to keep a constant angle of attack but speed-only during approach. When the possibility of maintaining speed during an entire flight was introduced, it led to the creation of the modern autothrottle. The RA-5C Vigilante used an autothrottle actuated by the input from accelerometers installed in the tail which caused the throttle to be sensitive to movement of the stabilator. This allowed the pilot to adjust the throttle setting during landing approach by stick input alone.

Shortly after AutoPower's success, two companies, Sperry (now part of Honeywell) and Collins started competing in the development of an autothrottle, with more and more liners and business jets being equipped with it.

Today, it is often linked to a flight management system. FADEC is an extension of the autothrottle concept and controls many other parameters besides fuel flow.

== See also ==
- Thrust lever
- Asiana Airlines Flight 214 - crashed when the pilot changed the auto pilot setting that disengaged the auto-throttle
- Atlas Air Flight 3591 – 2019 crash of a Boeing 767 freighter in which the pilot unknowingly switched the A/T to go-around mode in instrument meteorological conditions and suffered a head-up somatogravic illusion
- TAROM Flight 371 - crashed after an auto-throttle failure and incapacitation of the captain
- Sriwijaya Air Flight 182 - crashed after an auto-throttle failure
