= TAROM Flight 35 =

1970 airliner crash in Romania

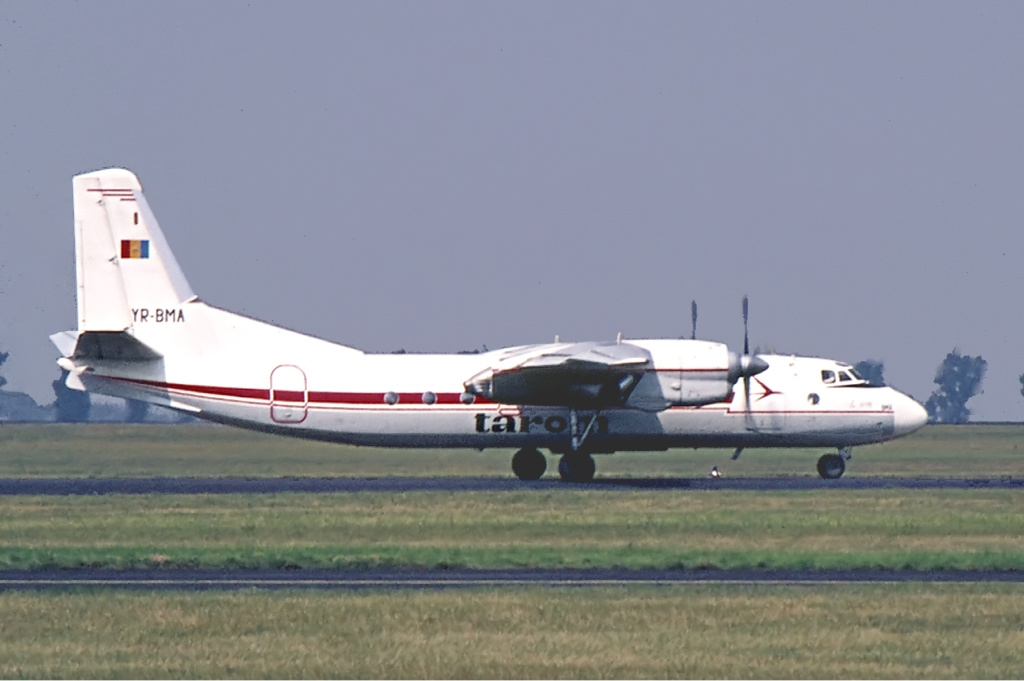
- A TAROM Antonov An-24 similar to the one involved

Accident
- Date: February 4, 1970
- Summary: CFIT due to pilot error
- Site: Vlădeasa Mountain, Cluj County, Romania

Aircraft
- Aircraft type: Antonov An-24
- Operator: Tarom
- Registration: YR-AMT
- Flight origin: Henri Coandă International Airport
- Destination: Oradea International Airport
- Passengers: 15
- Crew: 6
- Fatalities: 20
- Injuries: 1
- Survivors: 1

TAROM Flight 35 was a scheduled domestic passenger flight, with an Antonov An-24 from Henri Coandă International Airport in Romania's capital Bucharest to Oradea International Airport in Oradea, Romania. The flight was operated by TAROM, the flag carrier of Romania. On 4 February 1970, the Antonov An-24, registered as YR-AMT, crashed into a cliff near Vlădeasa Mountain while approaching Oradea International Airport, causing the deaths of 20 out of the 21 occupants of the airplane.

== Investigation ==
Investigation of the crash revealed that the captain believed he was above Oradea and started descending under low visibility without contacting the air traffic tower, whilst he was actually over 70 kilometres (43 mi) away from the airport, crashing shortly afterwards. The sole survivor was Ludovic Alexandru Sarkadi, a male passenger from Oradea. It was reported, years later, that multiple other passengers had survived the initial crash, but subsequently died from hypothermia.
