= 1980 Nouadhibou Tupolev Tu-154 crash =

1980 aviation accident in Mauritania

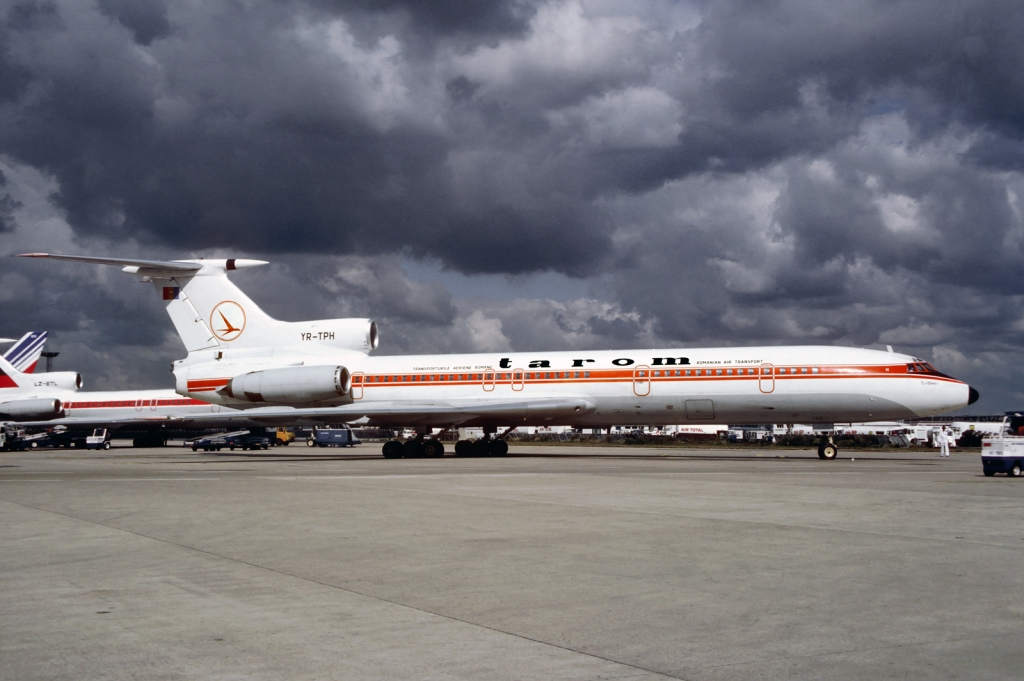
- YR-TPH, the aircraft involved in the incident, photographed in 1979

Accident
- Date: 7 August 1980
- Summary: Crashed on approach due to ATC error and navigational equipment failure
- Site: near Nouadhibou International Airport, Nouadhibou, Mauritania

Aircraft
- Aircraft type: Tupolev Tu-154B-1
- Operator: TAROM
- Registration: YR-TPH
- Flight origin: Bucharest Airport, Otopeni, Romania
- Destination: Nouadhibou International Airport, Nouadhibou, Mauritania
- Occupants: 168
- Passengers: 152
- Crew: 16
- Fatalities: 1
- Injuries: 13
- Survivors: 167

On 7 August 1980, a Tupolev Tu-154B-1 operated by TAROM undershot the runway during a night landing at Nouadhibou and landed in the Atlantic Ocean. The flight was an international flight from Bucharest, Romania to Nouadhibou, Mauritania, carrying 152 passengers and 16 crew members. One passenger died, a few were severe injured and several others sustained other injuries.

== Aircraft ==
The plane involved was manufactured in May 1978. On June 6, it was sold to TAROM with the registration YR-TPH.

== Accident ==
The landing was made at night in foggy condition. When descending to the decision altitude (90 meters, 300 feet), the crew did not see the airfield lights. A go-around was considered until a crew member saw a flat surface below them. Mistaking for the airport, the crew continued the descent before realizing that it was actually the sea.

The airliner collided with the water 350 meters from the shore in the Atlantic Ocean. It then struck a sandbar, breaking in half as it was skidding. The landing was so smooth that passengers seated in the rear section did not immediately realized that the plane was in the water and waited for the ramp to disembark. Passenger climbed out onto the wing through the split in the fuselage. Despite numerous sharks in the area, they stayed away from the aircraft because the high-air intake prevented water from flooding the still-running engine, frightening the predators with its noise. Mauritanian coast guard ship arrived 30 to 60 minutes later. Initially, it was believed that everyone on board had survived until a body of a women was found in the rear section. From the autopsy, she died from a heart attack, not the crash itself. Also in the initial case, one person was missing. Two passengers, a flight attendant and the co-pilot were severely injured and several other first-class passengers sustaned minor injuries. A total of 13 injured people were reported.

== Aftermath ==
According to investigators, the cause of the crash was a malfunction in the airport's navigational equipment, and no warnings were reported to the pilot. As a result, the airliner deviated slightly to the south of the original path; therefore, the crew can't see the airport lights as expected.The pilots were not blamed for the crash and TAROM was compensated with $36 million.
