= TAROM Flight 785A =

1991 Ilyushin II-18 flight accident

- YR-IMH, the aircraft involved in the accident, pictured in 1984

Accident
- Date: 13 August 1991
- Summary: Controlled flight into terrain due to pilot error
- Site: Retezat Mountains, near Uricani, Hunedoara County, Romania

Aircraft
- Aircraft type: Ilyushin Il-18
- Operator: TAROM
- Registration: YR-IMH
- Flight origin: Bucharest Otopeni Airport, Bucharest, Romania
- Destination: Timișoara Traian Vuia International Airport, Timișoara, Romania
- Occupants: 9
- Passengers: 4
- Crew: 5
- Fatalities: 9
- Survivors: 0

TAROM Flight 785A was a repositioning flight in Romania from Bucharest to Timișoara. On 13 August 1991, the Ilyushin Il-18 crashed into the Retezat Mountains while descending to Timișoara Traian Vuia International Airport, killing the five crew members and four company employees.

== Accident ==
The plane took off from Bucharest Otopeni Airport at 23:15. By the time the pilots reported to be 5 nautical miles from the city of Deva, they had descended from 6,100 meters (20,000 feet) to 2,440 meters (8,000 feet). A minute before impact, the crew reported flying over Făgețelu and had received clearance to land at Timișoara Traian Vuia International Airport. At 23:53, the pilots confirmed intercepting the beacon, but the transmission was interrupted. Ten seconds later, the ATC heard the pilots last message: "See, it's coming...", before losing radio contact. The aircraft crashed into rocks, killing all nine on board.

== Investigation ==
The cause of the crash was concluded to be pilot error. It is found that the pilots had deviated the flight plan as they did not follow air navigation procedures, falsely reported their position and did not fully use the radio navigation equipment on board.

== Theories ==
On August 4, 1991, several luminous spheres was witness by seven people and which assumingly were UFO. After the accident, it was suspected that the UFO might have connection with the crash. On the day of the crash, witness found two flying objects: the Il-18 and flame. The theory stated that the flame had collided with the Il-18, causing the plane to lose control, and the pilots tried to perform an emergency landing on the forest. In 1994, analysis of the impact stated that the pilots might have been aware of their situation and attempt an emergency landing. Combined with the fact that the tragedy was kept secret, there was also a theory that it was shot down by a surface-to-air missile, launched from one of the military anti-aircraft units in the area. Those theories were refuted by the investigators.
