= Mulyadi Tamsir =

Indonesian politician (1981–2021)

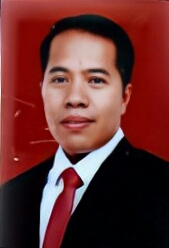

Chairman of Muslim Students' Association
- In office 5 December 2015 – 30 March 2018
- Preceded by: Arief Rosyid
- Succeeded by: Saddam Al Jihad

Personal details
- Born: 8 April 1981; Lampung, Indonesia
- Died: 9 January 2021 (aged 39); Thousand Islands, Jakarta, Indonesia
- Political party: People's Conscience Party
- Spouse: Makrufatul Yeti Srianingsih (m. 2020)

Mulyadi Tamsir (8 April 1981 – 9 January 2021) was an Indonesian student activist and politician from the People's Conscience Party who was the chairman of the Muslim Students' Association from 2015 until 2018.

== Early life and education ==
Mulyadi was born on 8 April 1981 in Lampung as the son of Ponijan and Katimah. At the age of 4, Mulyadi and his parents moved to Sintang Regency in West Kalimantan. Mulyadi graduated from the Serangas State Elementary School in 1993, West Kalimantan Junior High School in 1996, and the Budi Luhur Business Management Vocational School in 1999.

After he graduated from the vocational school, Mulyadi did not continue his study to university due to the lack of funds. He instead worked for about two years, until he obtained enough money to attend the Social and Political Faculty of the Kapuas University. He studied from the university for six years until he graduated in 2007. Mulyadi then moved to Malang, where he enrolled at the Indonesian Economic Institute and graduated from the institute with a Bachelor of Economics degree in 2009. Two years later, Mulyadi attended the Faculty of Economics of the Trisakti University to pursue postgraduate degree in economics.

== In the Muslim Students' Association ==
=== Positions ===
Mulyadi joined the Muslim Students' Association (HMI) in October 2001 while he was in the Kapuas University. Two years, Mulyadi was put in charge of supervising members of the association in the university and was promoted again to become the chairman of the Sintang branch of the association. Between 2005 and 2013, Mulyadi was promoted several times, ranging from regencial and provincial positions, until he was appointed in 2013 as the secretary general of the organization. As a secretary general, Mulyadi was involved in various protests which criticized government policies, such as demonstration against rising fuel prices.

=== Chairman of the Muslim Students' Association ===
Mulyadi was elected as the chairman of the Muslim Students' Association (HMI) on 5 December 2015. Mulyadi ran against Azhar Kahfi in the section round of the election, where he obtained 224 votes, while Kahfi only obtained 181 votes. Mulyadi served as chairman until his term ended on 30 March 2018.

During his tenure, the November 2016 Jakarta protests occurred, with HMI as one of the main perpetrators of the protests. However, the protests soon turned violent and Mulyadi's secretary general—along with five HMI cadres—was arrested by the police. The Indonesian National Police speculated that there were a group of politicians inciting the riots and interrogated Mulyadi as the chairman of the organization. Mulyadi defended the innocence of the organizations, stating that the arrests had no legal basis and that a group of unknown students were the one who should be blamed for the riots. Mulyadi then formed a legal team to challenge the arrests conducted by the police. He stated that the arrests "did not conform with the human rights principles". The police later relented and freed Mulyadi's secretary general and the five cadres on 17 November. In an interview conducted after the arrests, Mulyadi denied that the demonstration was masterminded by certain political groups and stated that the association was an "independent and idealist" association.

In March 2017, a photo of Mulyadi wearing a shirt with the word "Anies-Sandi" and a logo of HMI became viral. A number of HMI branches criticized Mulyadi for his partisanship in the 2017 Jakarta gubernatorial election. Joni Riski Putra, the chairman of the association in Bukittinggi, demanded Mulyadi to resign from his position because Mulyadi had violated the HMI constitution for wearing the shirt.

== In the People's Conscience Party ==
After his term ended, Mulyadi joined the People's Conscience Party in 2018 and became the Deputy Treasurer of the Party. As part of his job, Mulyadi organized meetings for provincial legislature candidates to consolidate in the 2019 elections. Mulyadi himself ran as a candidate for the People's Representative Council from the East Java I electoral district, but he did not win the election. After the election, he became the chairman for organization affairs of the party.

== Personal life ==
Mulyadi was married to Makrufatul Yeti Srianingsih on 20 November 2020.

== Death ==
Mulyadi, alongside his wife, a parent-in-law and one child, died on 9 January 2021 on board Sriwijaya Air Flight 182, which crashed in the waters near Thousand Islands. His body, along with five other victims of the crash, was identified on 19 January 2021. His body was handed over to his family a day later and he was buried in a public cemetery near his house on 21 January 2021. A number of HMI members and government officials, including the chairman of the Indonesian Investment Coordinating Board Bahlil Lahadalia and the Governor of Jakarta Anies Baswedan, conducted a funeral prayer for Mulyadi in the HMI headquarters.
