= TAROM =

Flag carrier of Romania

TAROM — Romanian Air Transport TAROM — Transporturile Aeriene Române

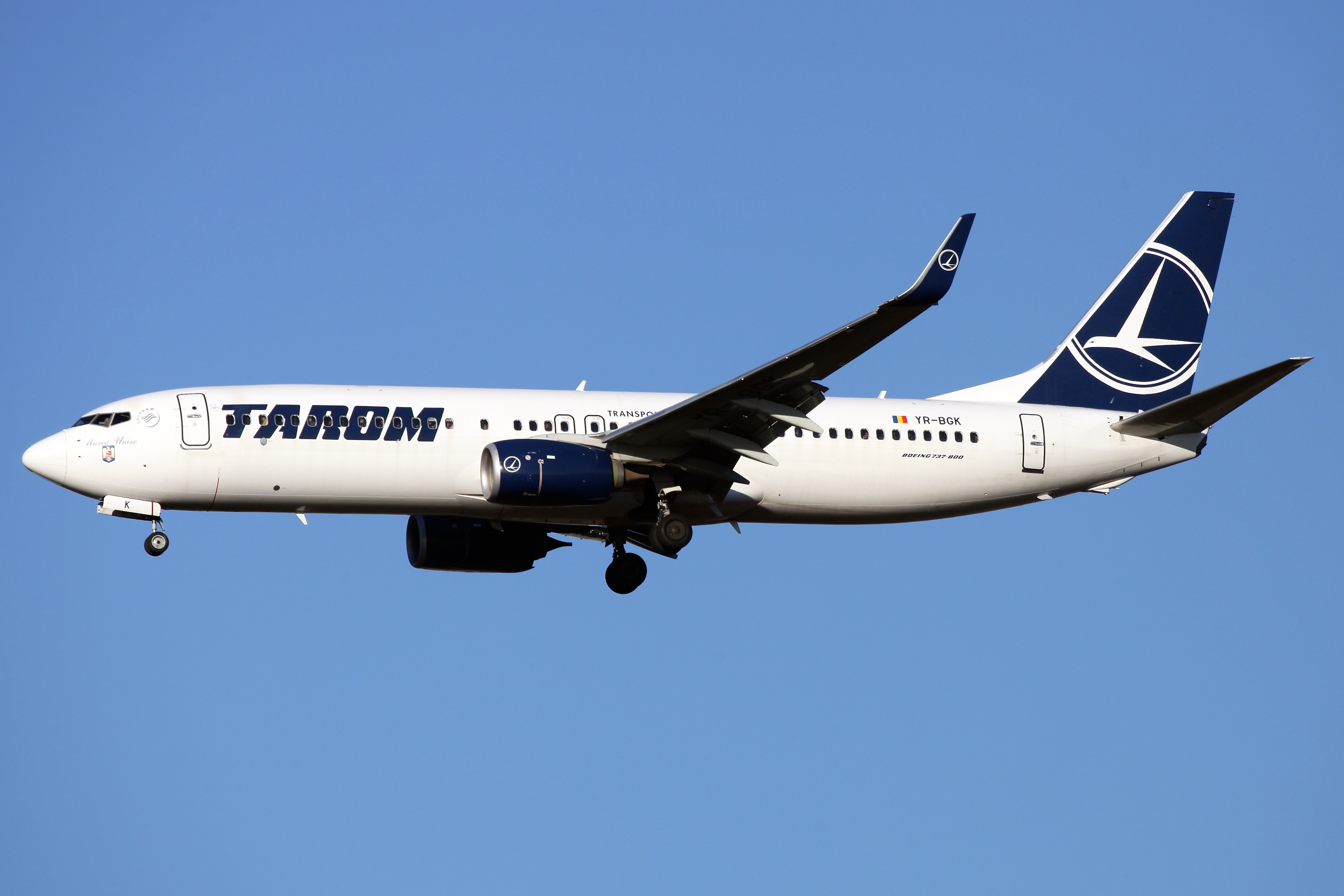
- TAROM Boeing 737-800
IATA	ICAO	Call sign
RO	ROT	TAROM
- Founded: 1 January 1920; 106 years ago (as CFRNA)
- Commenced operations: 18 September 1954; 72 years ago (as TAROM)
- AOC #: RO-001
- Hubs: Bucharest Henri Coandă International Airport
- Frequent-flyer program: Flying Blue
- Alliance: SkyTeam
- Fleet size: 14
- Destinations: 28
- Headquarters: Otopeni, Ilfov County, Romania
- Key people: Cristian Anghel (CEO)
- Revenue: ▲433 million € (2024)
- Operating income: ▲60 million € (2024)
- Website: www.tarom.ro

TAROM (Romanian pronunciation: [taˈrom]; legally Compania Națională de Transporturi Aeriene Române TAROM S.A.) is the flag carrier and oldest operating airline of Romania. Headquartered in Otopeni, near Bucharest, the airline operates its main hub at Henri Coandă International Airport. TAROM serves destinations across Europe and the Middle East and has been a member of the SkyTeam alliance since 2010.

The name TAROM is an acronym of Romanian: Transporturile Aeriene Române (Romanian Air Transport). The airline is owned by the Government of Romania and traces its origins to 1920, making it one of the oldest airlines in Europe. Since the 2020s, TAROM has undergone a restructuring programme that included fleet renewal and operational reforms aimed at improving its financial performance.

== History ==
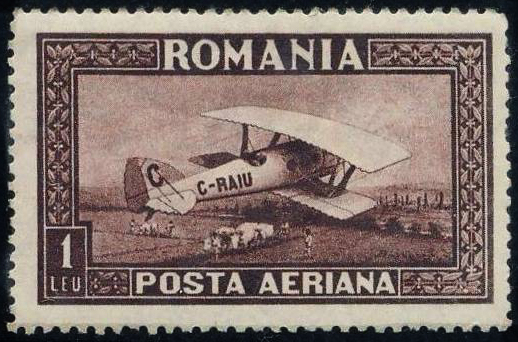
A photo of a Blériot-SPAD S.46 on an airmail stamp

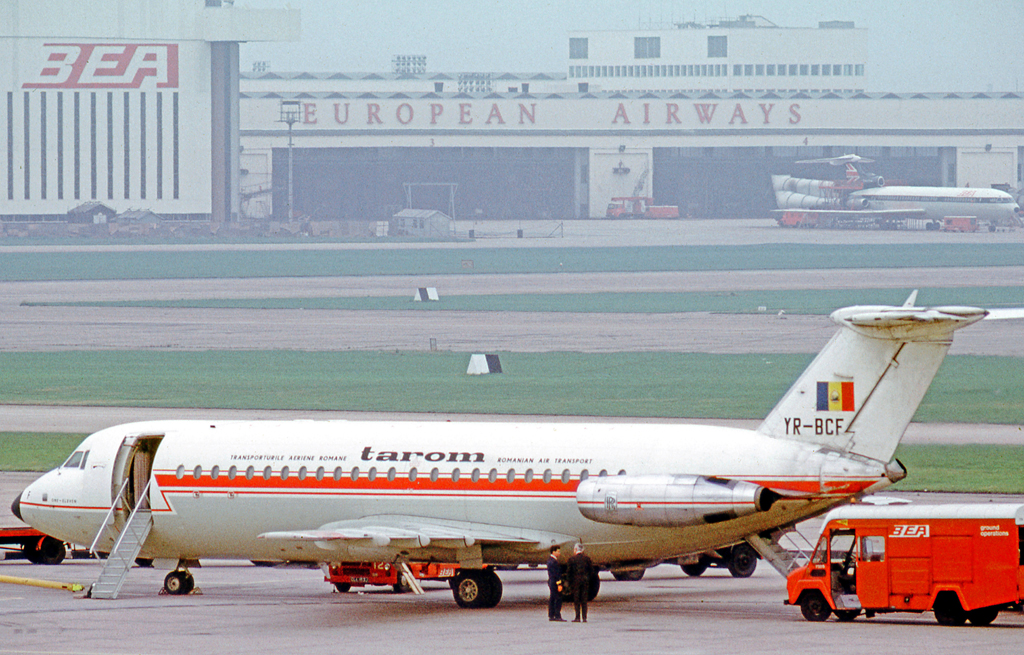
TAROM RomBAC 1-11 at London Heathrow Airport in 1971

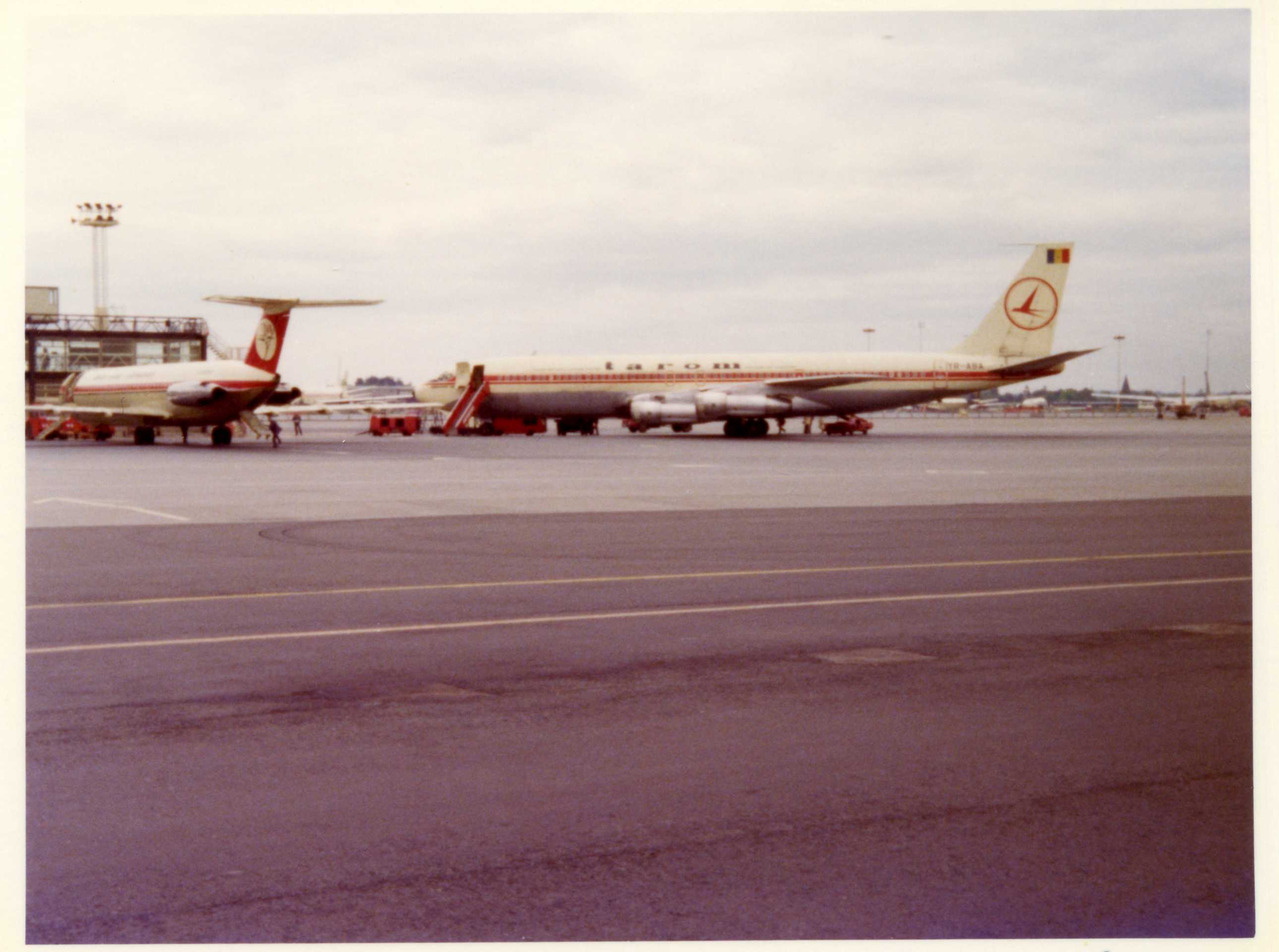
TAROM Boeing 707 (YR-ABA) at London Gatwick Airport

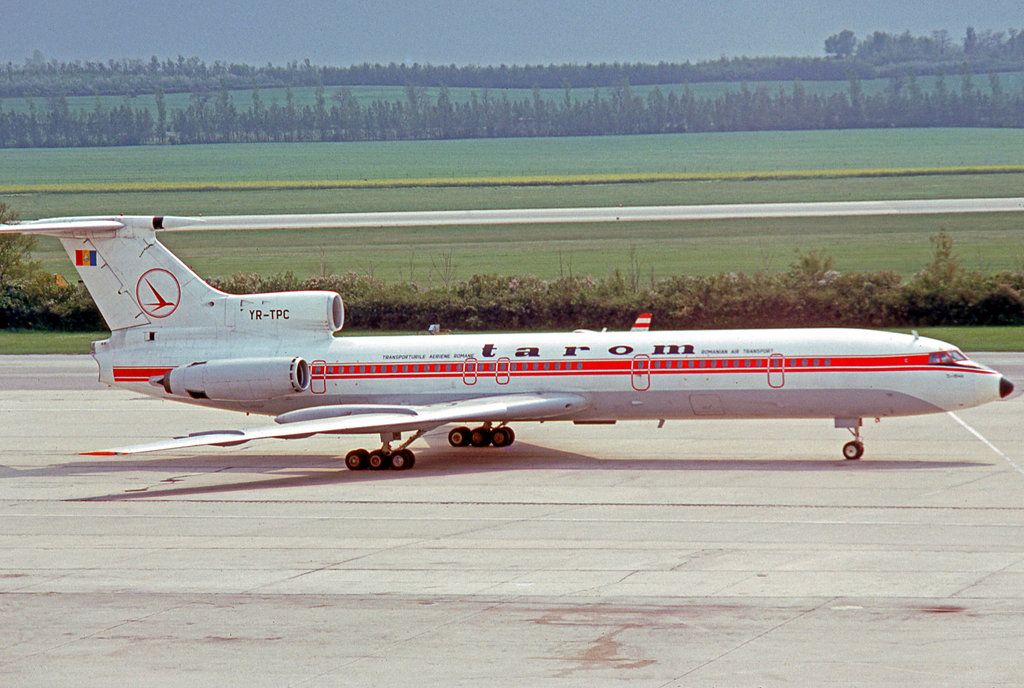
TAROM Tupolev Tu-154B at Vienna Airport in 1977

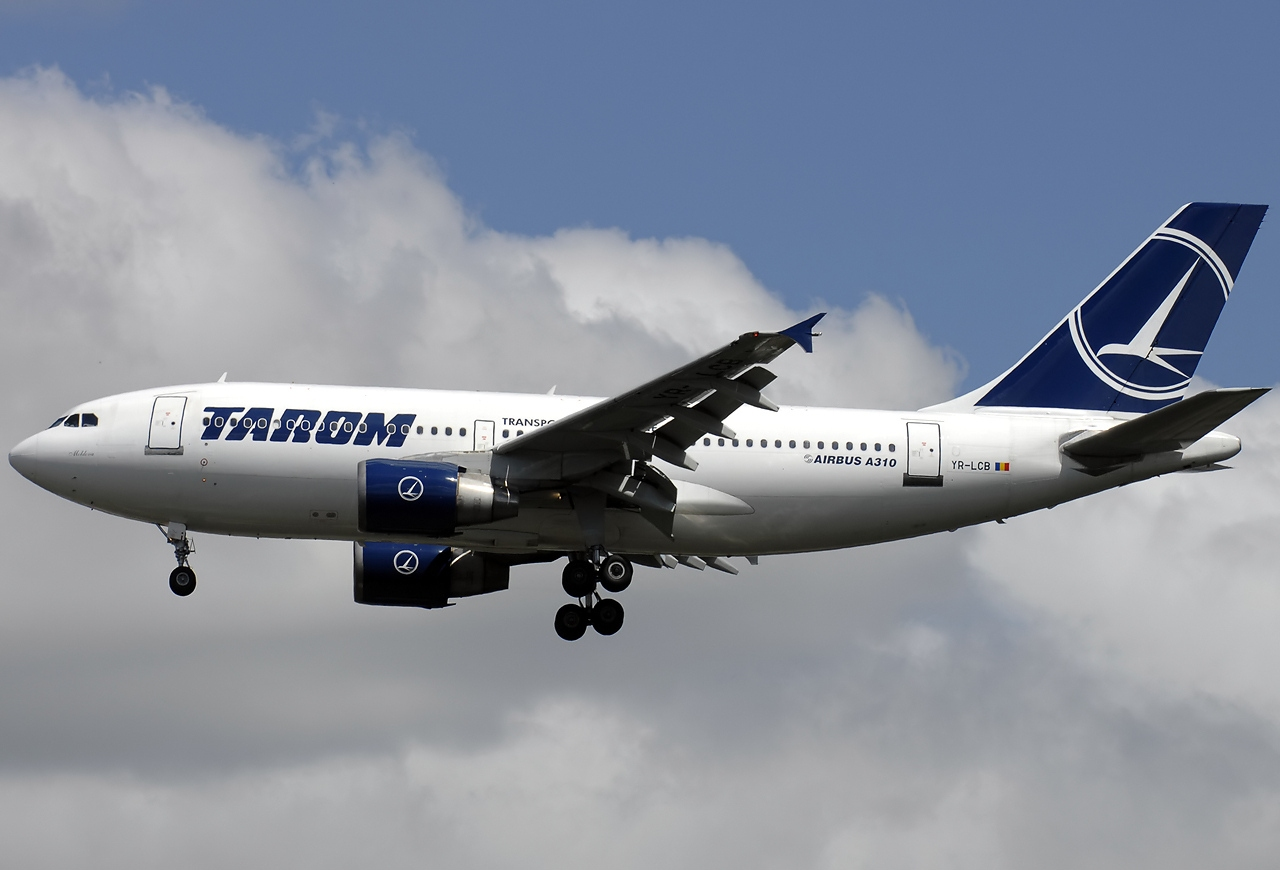
TAROM Airbus A310-300 in 2008

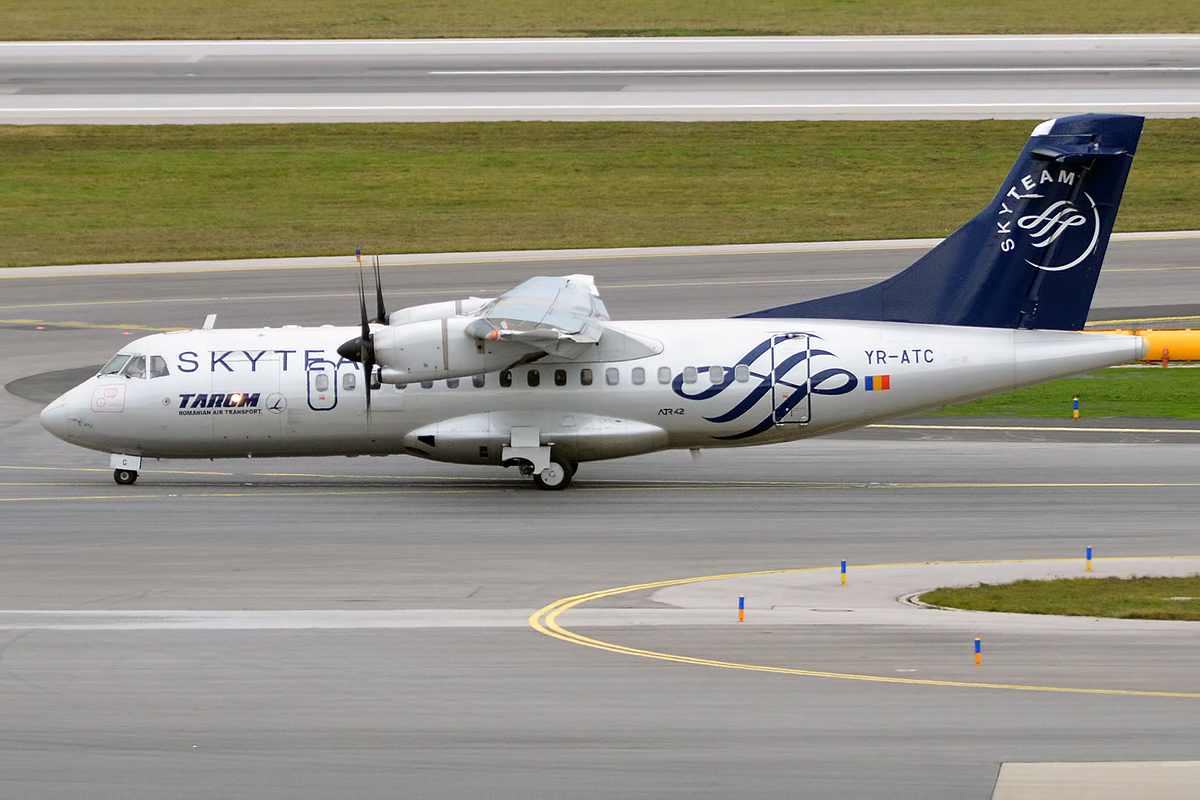
A former TAROM ATR 42-500 wearing the SkyTeam special livery

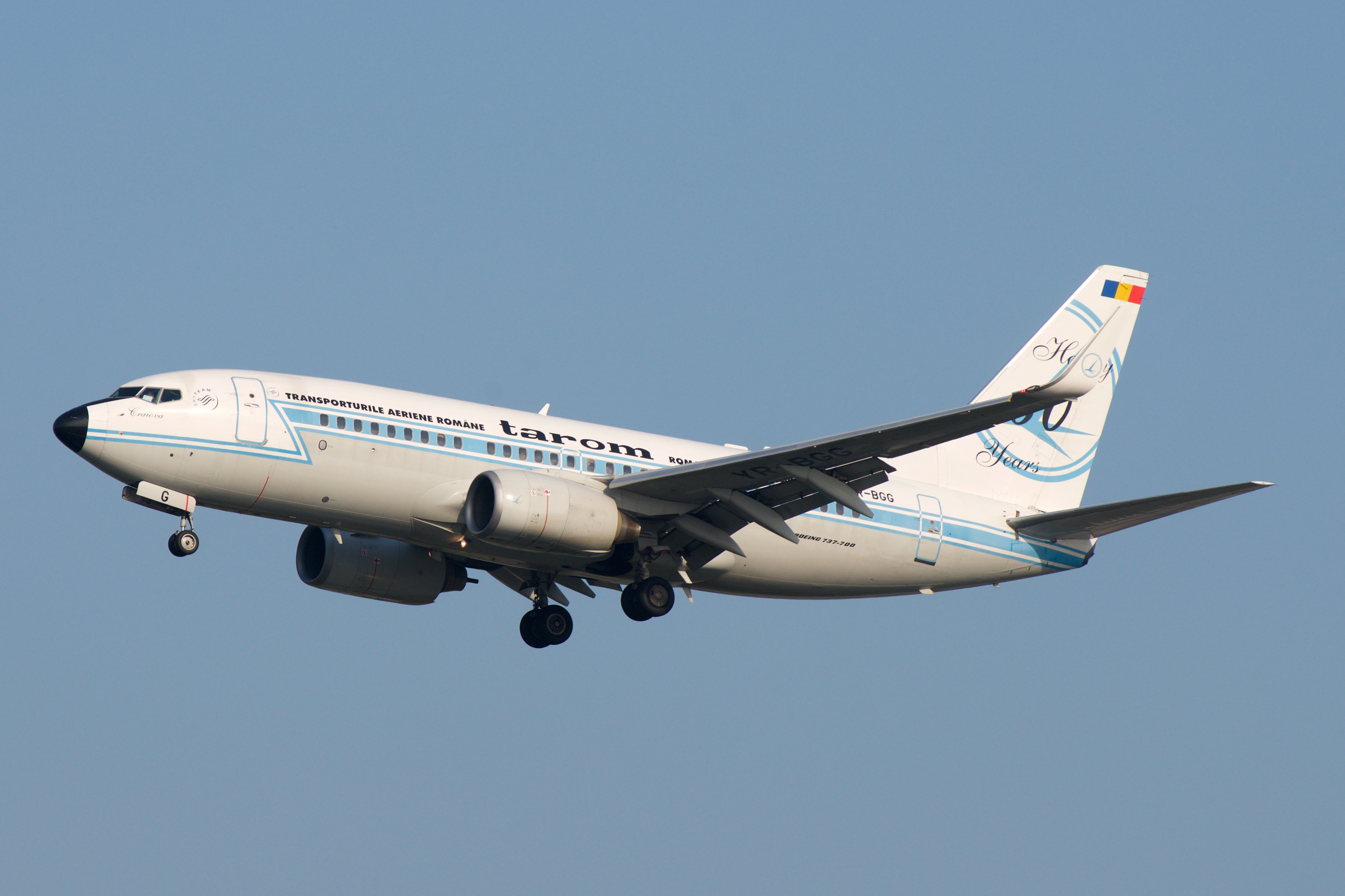
60th anniversary livery on a TAROM Boeing 737-700. The same aircraft had been used to promote the airline's 55th jubilee.

=== Early years ===
The history of the Romanian National Air Transport Company can be traced back to 1920, when CFRNA - (French-Romanian Company for Air Navigation) was founded. On 13 April 1920, the company registered its headquarters at 194 Rue Rivoli, in Paris. A decree issued on 26 April 1920 establishes Direcțiunea Aviației (The Directorate of Aviation), in the subordination of the Ministry of Communications. In the same year, the Kingdom of Romania offered CFRNA exploitation rights. The country offered the airline two aerodromes: one in Arad, and another one in Bucharest–Băneasa. The airline used French-built Potez 15 aircraft for its passenger/mail service between Paris and Bucharest via several cities in Central Europe. In 1925, the city of Galați became the first destination in Romania served by regular flights followed, from 24 June 1926, by an extended service to Iași and Chișinău. Ten de Havilland DH.9 and five Ansaldo A.300, in addition to the Potez aircraft, operated the service.

In 1928, the airline changed its name to SNNA (Serviciul Național de Navigație Aeriană, The National Service of Air Navigation). On 9 July 1930, the company adopted the name LARES (Liniile Aeriene Române Exploatate de Stat, Romanian Airlines Operated by the State) while 20 July 1937 saw the merger of LARES with its competitor, SARTA (Societatea Anonimă Română de Transporturi Aeriene).

=== State monopoly ===
Immediately after World War II, in 1945, when the Soviet Union had extended its influence across Eastern Europe, a new reorganization replaced LARES with TARS (Transporturi Aeriene Româno-Sovietice), jointly owned by the governments of Romania and the Soviet Union. Domestic operations were started from Bucharest (Băneasa Airport) on 1 February 1946, when TARS took overall air services and aircraft from LARES.

Over the following decade, the company's Soviet share was purchased by the Romanian government and, on 18 September 1954, the airline adopted the name of TAROM (Transporturi Aeriene Române, Romanian Air Transport). By 1960, TAROM was flying to a dozen cities across Europe. 1966 saw the operation of its first transatlantic flight. On 14 May 1974, it launched a regular service to New York City (John F. Kennedy International Airport).

Being part of the regional group of airlines within Eastern Bloc states meant that for much of its history, TAROM has operated Soviet-designed aircraft. These included the Lisunov Li-2, Ilyushin Il-14, Ilyushin Il-18 long-range turboprop, Ilyushin Il-62 long-range jet airliner, Antonov An-24 regional turboprop, and Tupolev Tu-154 medium-range tri-jet. As was the case with several other nations, the Il-62 was the first long-range jet airliner to be put into operation by Romania in 1973. Five examples (three Il-62 and two later version Il-62M) were owned by TAROM, which also leased the aircraft to other operators.

Exceptions to Soviet-built aircraft were made in 1968, when TAROM bought six BAC One-Eleven 400 aircraft for European and Middle Eastern destinations, and in 1974 when it acquired Boeing 707 aircraft to share its long-haul operations with the Il-62. Plans were made to acquire Vickers VC10 aircraft as well, but in the end, the Soviets did not allow it, and made them buy the Il-62 instead. With 59 aircraft in operation, in the late 1970s, TAROM had the largest fleet in the Eastern Bloc, after Aeroflot.

=== Transition ===
After the collapse of the communist regime in 1989, the airline, operating a fleet of 65 aircraft of six basic types, was able to acquire more Western-built jets. In 1992, TAROM bought 3 Airbus A310 planes, nicknamed: "Transilvania" (YR-LCA), "Moldova" (YR-LCB) and "Muntenia" (YR-LCC). By 1993, TAROM had introduced long-haul flights to Montreal and Bangkok using Ilyushin Il-62 and Airbus A310 aircraft. The YR-LCC Airbus A310 joined TAROM's fleet on 10 April 1994, to then crash near Balotești on 31 March 1995.

During the 1990s, TAROM replaced its long-haul fleet of Boeing 707s and IL-62s with Airbus A310s (the last Il-62 being sold in 1999).

=== Modernisation ===
TAROM is recovering from a difficult period that began in the 1990s when losses of up to $68 million per year were registered, caused by unprofitable routes. At the beginning of the new millennium, the airline initiated a programme that was aimed at restoring profitability. This was achieved by terminating loss-making intercontinental services. In 2001, the airline cancelled its non-profitable long-haul services to Bangkok and Montreal and also terminated services to its remaining intercontinental destinations of Chicago in 2002, and Beijing and New York City in 2003. TAROM terminated loss-making domestic services to Craiova, Tulcea, Caransebeș, and Constanța, and focused its activity on service to key destinations in Europe and the Middle East. TAROM has decided to focus its operations on Bucharest (Henri Coandă International Airport) (OTP) and Cluj-Napoca International Airport (CLJ), and initiated direct international flights from Sibiu International Airport. The first profitable year in the 2000s was 2004. By 2005, TAROM tried selling its A310 fleet three times, which was being preserved since 2003.

A fleet upgrade programme started in 2006 with the acquisition of four Airbus A318, three Boeing 737-800, and two ATR 72-500, which resulted in a fleet increase to 26 by 2009.

From 2003 until 2007, the airline spent €1 million per year to preserve its A310s "Moldova" and "Transilvania". In 2007, TAROM modernized its two Airbus A310 aircraft at the Airbus plant in Bordeaux. After being reconditioned, they were used in medium-haul flights, which were not successful.

The airline had a frequent-flyer programme "Smart Miles", which was turned into Flying Blue on 5 June 2010. Codeshare agreements with foreign partner airlines are in place for several international routes. On 25 June 2010, TAROM joined SkyTeam as the alliance's 13th member.

Starting with November 2012, in accordance with the Romanian state-company legislation, TAROM was led by a private manager, the Belgian Christian Heinzmann occupying the positions of CEO and Accountable Manager until March 2016. During Heinzmann's leadership, the company reduced its financial losses by more than 75%, grew its yearly passenger number to a record 2.4 million and stabilised its load-factor around 70%. However, broad reforms like the fleet renewal and harmonisation, as well as the establishment of profit centers such as the TAROM Maintenance and TAROM Charter services, were not accomplished due to a constant lack of a decision from the company's board of administrators.

On 12 September and 29 October 2016, TAROM retired their remaining two Airbus A310-300s after final flights from Madrid to Bucharest. The A310 aircraft were to be replaced with new smaller aircraft. In May 2017, TAROM received its first of two leased Boeing 737-800s. Another two ex-Malaysian Airlines 737-800 were added to the fleet in 2018 and a contract for five Boeing 737 MAX 8 was signed with deliveries stated to begin in 2023. On 27 December 2019, the Ministry of Transport announced that nine new ATR 72-600 leased from Nordic Aviation Capital for a ten year-period would replace the existent ATR 42-500 and 72-500, manufactured in 1999–2000 and 2009, respectively. TAROM received the first four aircraft in February 2020.

=== Restructuring ===
The COVID-19 pandemic caused TAROM to temporarily cease all scheduled operations from 25 March 2020. TAROM operated flights for the Romanian Government during the state of emergency, bringing medical equipment from China. After the state of emergency expired, TAROM resumed scheduled operations from May 2020.

In 2021, TAROM's then new CEO stated that none of the airline's current routes were profitable. In October 2022, it was reported that the operator of Henri Coandă International Airport, TAROM's home base, was considering legal action against the airline over unpaid fees exceeding €10 million, and also might suspend all services for the carrier.

In November 2024, the European General Court rejected a legal challenge by low-cost carrier Wizz Air against a capital injection provided by the Romanian government to TAROM. The aid, valued at €2 million, was approved by the European Commission as part of efforts to compensate TAROM for losses related to COVID-19 travel restrictions. Wizz Air argued that this financial support violated EU competition laws, but the court affirmed the European Commission's decision, ruling that the subsidy was in compliance with EU state aid regulations.

== Corporate affairs ==
=== Ownership ===
TAROM is a state-owned company, with shareholding structure as follows:

Shareholder	Interest
Romanian Government (held through the Ministry of Transport)	98.0141%
Bucharest Airport	1.0398%
ROMATSA R.A.(Romanian Air Traffic Services Administration)	0.886%
Longshield Investment Group S.A.	0.0601%
Total	100.00%

=== Business trends ===
Figures for recent years are shown below (for years ending 31 December):

FY	Turnover (€M)	Profit (€M)	Number of employees (Note: on average)	Number of passengers (m)	Passenger load factor (%)	Number of aircraft (Note: at year end)	References
2004	190	1.4		1.1	63.6	16	
2005	220	1.1	2,289	1.4	61.0	18	
2006	234	12.3	2,333	1.4	62.3	20	
2007	261	21.8	2,338	1.8	67.2	22	
2008	257	−1.7	2,471	1.9	61.9	24	
2009	193	−55	2,517	1.7	55.6	26	
2010	218	−79	2,353	2.2	60.9	26	
2011	279	−58	2,200	2.1	60.6	26	
2012	238	−54.5	2,070	2.1	66.0	24	
2013	247	−29.5	2,006	2.1	65.9	24	
2014	258	−25	1,969	2.3	66.0	24	
2015	256	−6.2	1,880	2.3	70.0	23	
2016	239	−10.5	1,841	2.4	68.1	21	
2017	255	−37.7	1,776	2.3	71.6	23	
2018	306	−27.5	1,773	2.8	74	25	
2019	315	−35.8	1,750	3.1	74.9	25	
2023		−20					
2024	433	60	1,312			14	

=== Logo and livery ===
The TAROM logo used in the 1970s and 1980s

The TAROM logo until 2015, infrequent use in publications from 2015

The TAROM logo, representing a swallow in flight, has been used on all TAROM aircraft since 1954. The 1970s livery had the logo on the tail painted in red, with a red cheatline. The livery introduced in the early 1990s (on the Airbus A310 aircraft) is an overall-white scheme with the titles and the tailfin painted in dark blue. The current colour scheme (introduced in 2006 on the Airbus A318 aircraft) is a slightly modified version of the previous one, with an oversized logo on the tailfin, and the engine pods also painted in dark blue.

In 2009, marking the airline's 55th anniversary, a Boeing 737-700 (YR-BGG "Craiova") was painted in a retro jet colour scheme, representing the airline's first livery used in the 1950s on Lisunov Li-2 aircraft.

=== TAROM Technical Division ===
TAROM's Technical Division provides aircraft maintenance services for the company's entire fleet and aircraft of other companies. It provides maintenance for Boeing 737, ATR 42 and ATR 72 aircraft in central and eastern Europe and include unscheduled and scheduled maintenance, repairs and spare parts.

Major maintenance is performed in the division's hangar, built between 1969 and 1972, with an area of 6,000 m^{2} (65,000 sq ft) and updated in 2000 to comply with EASA and FAA standards. The hangar can be used to maintain three to six aircraft, depending on their size. The hangar is equipped with a full MERO system for Boeing 737 docking.

The department also has inspection capacity for type C for Airbus A310 and A318 aircraft, total painting, interior cleaning, and modifications.

The technical department also provides safe storage facilities for spare parts and materials necessary for maintenance, dedicated spaces for chemicals, special tools and testing equipment, and quarantine spaces. It also provides conveyance services (packaging, preparation of documents, customs) and acceptance services (customs, disassembly, and reception inspection) for various substances and equipment.

In a dispute between TAROM and UK airline Jet2.com regarding failure to provide adequate maintenance services for Jet2.com's fleet and the latter's resulting failure to pay certain invoices, the High Court in England determined that TAROM's attempt to terminate the contract in 2007 for non-payment was invalid, and treated the termination as a repudiatory breach of the contract. Jet2.com were awarded damages.

== Destinations ==
The airline operates flights to 50 destinations including charter and seasonal services in 22 countries in Europe, the Middle East and Northern Africa including eight domestic destinations. The airline's flights to the USA ceased in 2003 and are now operated under a codeshare agreement with Air France via Paris-Charles de Gaulle Airport.

=== Alliances ===
In 2006, TAROM was scheduled to join SkyTeam as an associate member (sponsored by Alitalia), but its accession was postponed until 2008. On 7 May 2008, SkyTeam signed a SkyTeam Alliance Associate Adherence Agreement (SAAAA) with TAROM. On 22 June 2010, SkyTeam announced that it had renewed its membership program, thereby making TAROM a future full member of the alliance. On 25 June 2010, TAROM became a full member of SkyTeam.

=== Codeshare agreements ===
TAROM has codeshare agreements with the following airlines:

- Air Europa
- Air France
- Air Serbia
- airBaltic
- Bulgaria Air
- Condor
- El Al
- KLM
- Middle East Airlines
- Scandinavian Airlines
- Turkish Airlines

== Fleet ==
=== Current fleet ===
As of September 2026, TAROM operates the following aircraft:

TAROM fleet
Aircraft	In service	Orders	Passengers			Notes
Aircraft	In service	Orders	J	Y	Total	Notes
ATR 72-500	2	—	—	68	68	To be replaced by ATR 72-600 aircraft.
ATR 72-600	4	3	—	72	72	
Boeing 737-700	1	—	14	102	116	To be retired and replaced by Boeing 737 MAX 8.
Boeing 737-800	4	—	16	144	160	
Boeing 737-800	4	—	—	189	189	
Boeing 737 MAX 8	1	8	—	186	186	To replace Boeing 737-700.
Total	14	11				

=== Fleet development ===
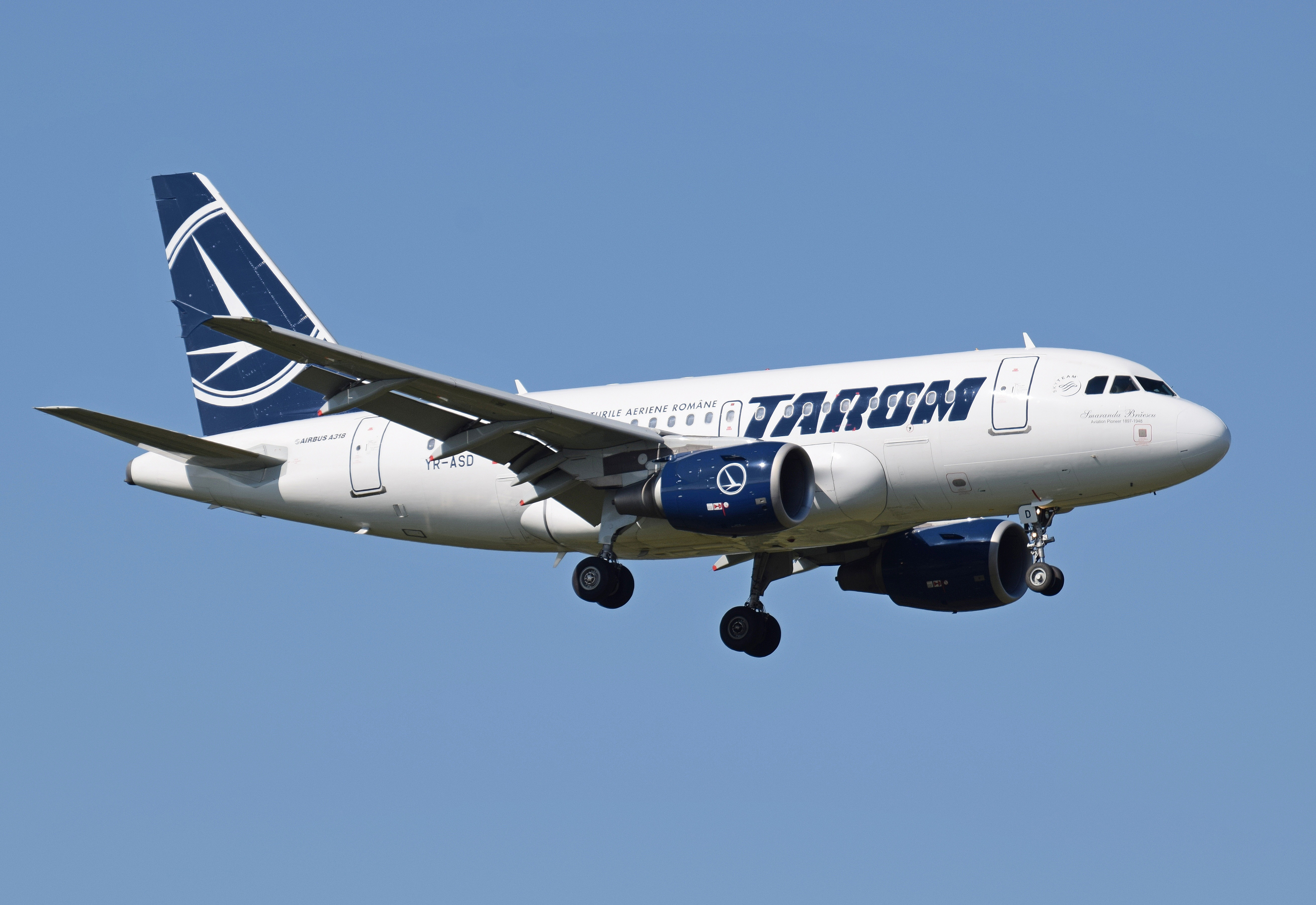
A former TAROM Airbus A318-100

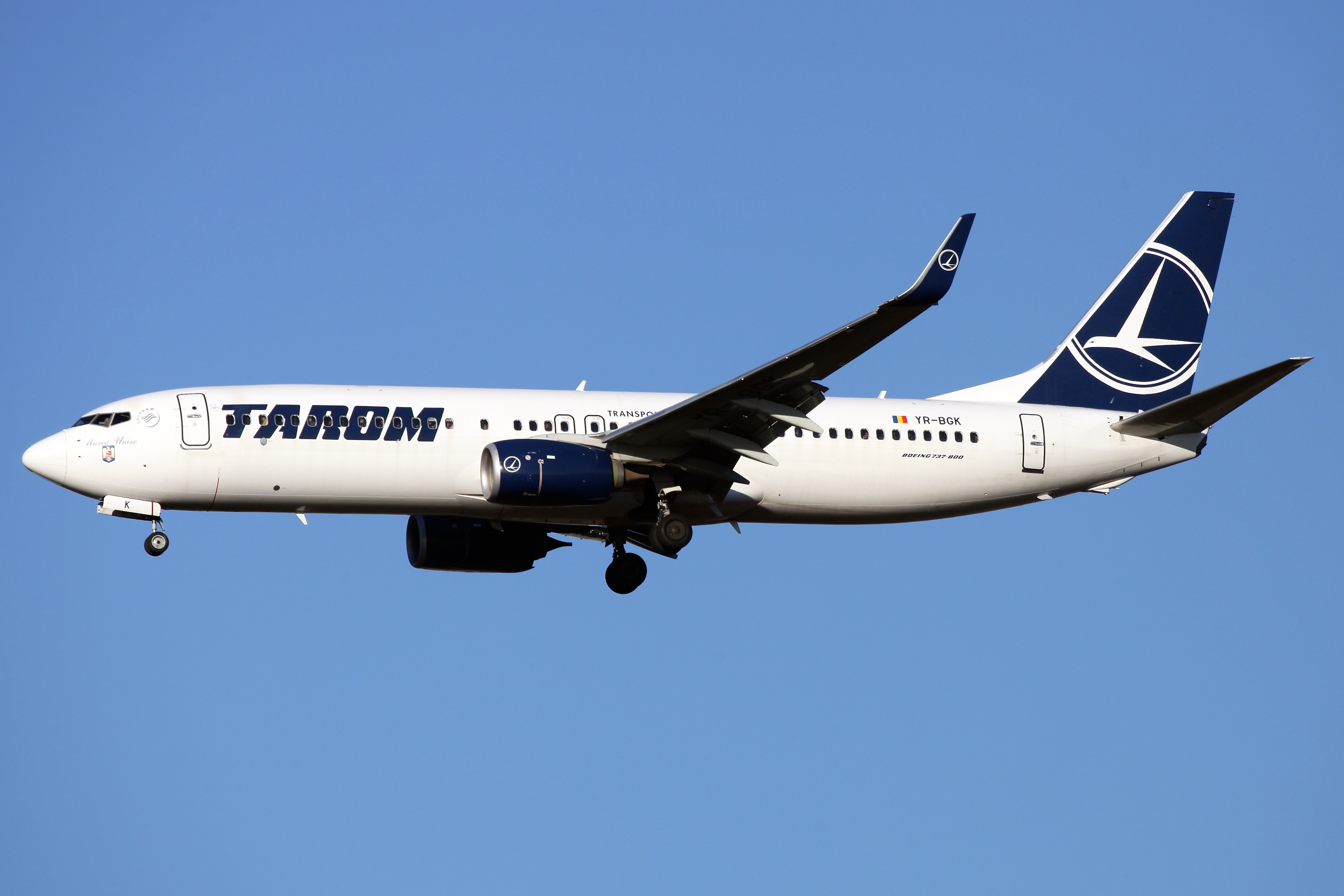
TAROM Boeing 737-800

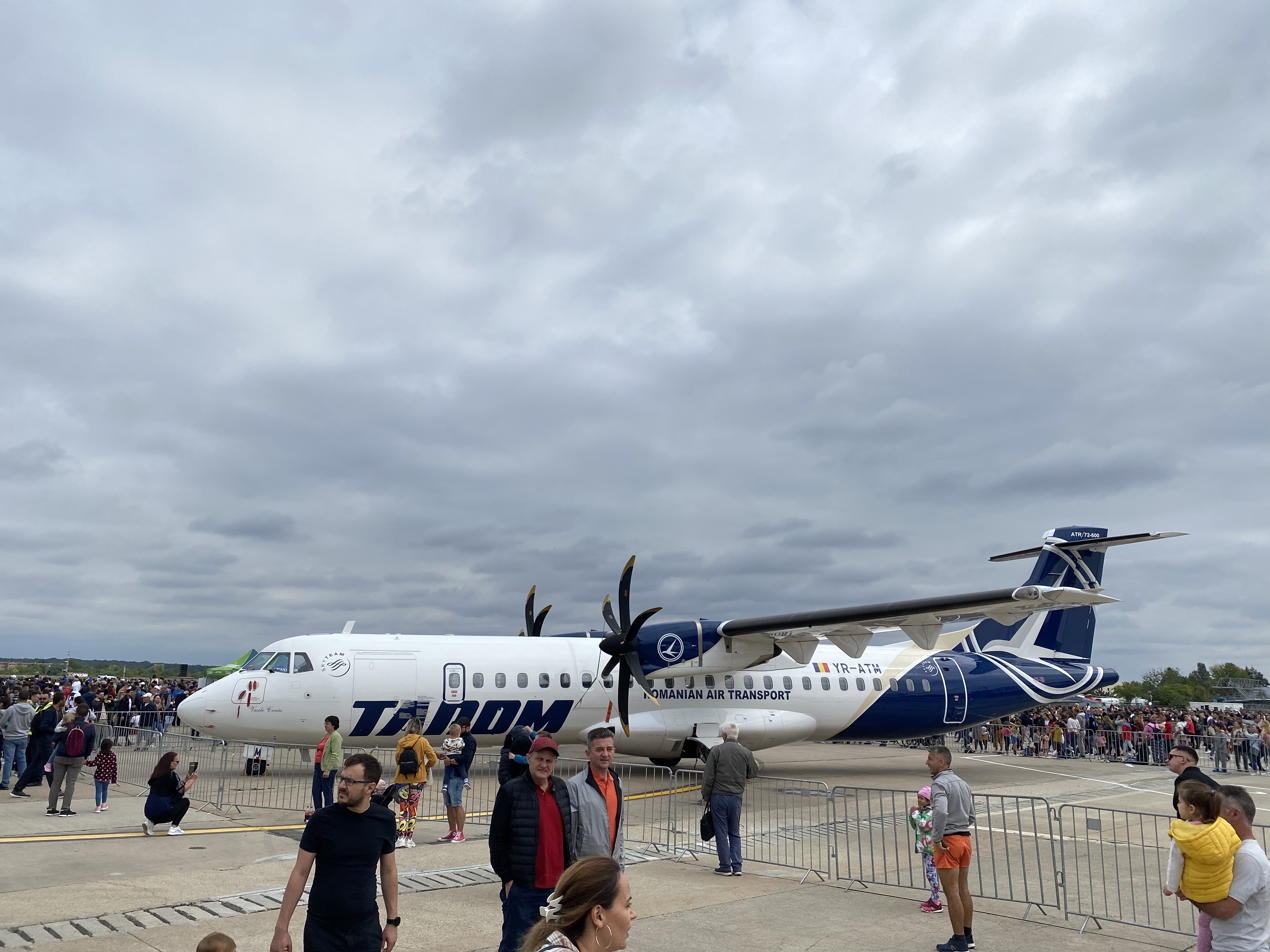
TAROM ATR 72-600 at Bucharest Air Show 2022, wearing a revised livery

==== Short-haul fleet ====
TAROM agreed in 2019 to lease nine ATR 72-600 aircraft from Nordic Aviation Capital to replace existing ATR 42-500 and ATR 72-500 aircraft. In 2021, the order was reduced from nine to seven ATR 72-600 aircraft.

==== Medium-haul fleet ====
After the retiring of Airbus A310s in 2016, two new Boeing 737-800 aircraft were leased in 2017. In 2018, another two Boeing 737-800 aircraft were leased. Also, at the Farnborough Air Show, the Government of Romania signed a contract to buy five Boeing 737 MAX 8 aircraft at an estimated value of $586 million. As of 2022, TAROM was negotiating with a few leasing companies for four to eight Boeing 737 MAX 8 aircraft.

==== Long-haul fleet ====
TAROM had been planning to lease three widebody aircraft to resume long-haul operations to China and the United States after the withdrawal of its Airbus A310s. The Request For Proposals (RFP) to leasing firms expired on 31 August 2017. In 2018, TAROM made efforts to lease some Boeing 787s, but there was no further development.

==== VIP fleet ====
In 2018, the CEO of that time declared that TAROM could operate a legacy aircraft with maximum ten seats which could fly over the Atlantic, in order to be leased by the Romanian Government, for VIP business affairs or in medical emergencies. There was no further development. Between 2010 and 2013, under the Băsescu administration, TAROM operated an Airbus A310-300 for presidential purposes.

=== Former fleet ===
During its history, TAROM also operated the following aircraft types:

- Airbus A310-300
- Airbus A318
- Antonov An-2
- Antonov An-24
- ATR 42
- BAC One-Eleven
- ROMBAC 1-11
- Boeing 707
- Boeing 737-300
- Boeing 737-500
- Ilyushin Il-14
- Ilyushin Il-18
- Ilyushin Il-62
- Lisunov Li-2
- McDonnell Douglas DC-10
- Mil Mi-4
- Tupolev Tu-154

== Incidents and accidents ==
- On 4 November 1957, a TAROM Ilyushin Il-14P (YR-PCC) operating a government flight from Bucharest to Moscow via Kiev, crashed short of the runway at Vnukovo Airport, killing four of 16 on board. The aircraft was on approach to Vnukovo Airport when the pilot noticed that the aircraft was too low, however, the aircraft continued its descent until it struck treetops and later crashed. The aircraft was carrying a Romanian delegation consisting of Chivu Stoica, Grigore Preoteasa, Alexandru Moghioroș, Ștefan Voitec, Nicolae Ceaușescu, Leonte Răutu and Marin Năstase to Moscow. Preoteasa, who apparently was not wearing a safety belt, and three Soviet crew members lost their lives.
- On 24 February 1962, an Ilyushin Il-18V, registration YR-IMB, operating on an international scheduled flight from Bucharest Otopeni Airport (OTP) to Tel Aviv via Nicosia lost power on all four engines and made a belly landing on a grassy field in Cyprus. While cruising at 23,000 feet (7,010 m) over the Mediterranean Sea and 43 miles (37 nmi; 69 km) offshore, engine number 3 lost power, followed shortly by number 1 and 2. Then, at 10,000 feet (3,048 m) and 27 miles (23 nmi; 43 km) offshore, engine 4 also quit. All 100 occupants survived. The aircraft was transported to Moscow for repairs, but it never re-entered service.
- On 16 June 1963, a VEB 14P (YR-ILL) flying from Munich to Constanța entered a dive and crashed near the village of Békéssámson, Hungary following engine problems, killing all 31 on board.
- On 9 October 1964, an Ilyushin Il-14P, registration YR-ILB, operating a domestic scheduled flight from Timișoara to Bucharest broke up in mid-air and crashed two kilometres (1.2 mi; 1.1 nmi) south of Cugir, killing all 31 on board. The aircraft had flown into a strong downdraft; the pilot attempted to maintain altitude, but this caused the fuselage to overstress and break up.
- On 11 August 1966, a Lisunov Li-2, registration YR-TAN, crashed in the Lotrioara Valley en route from Brașov to Constanţa, killing all 24 on board.
- On 4 February 1970, TAROM Flight 35, an Antonov An-24, registration YR-AMT, operating a domestic scheduled flight from Bucharest to Oradea struck the side of a mountain in the Vlădeasa mountain group, killing 20 of 21 on board; although nine people survived the crash, eight of them died in the low temperatures before rescuers reached the crash site. The aircraft began descending too soon in poor visibility until it struck treetops on a mountainside, after which it struck the slope of a second mountain. The aircraft was leased from the Romanian government.
- On 29 December 1974, an Antonov An-24, registration YR-AMD, operating on a domestic scheduled flight from Oradea to Bucharest was making an unscheduled stop at Sibiu and crashed into the side of the Lotrului mountains (22 kilometres (14 mi; 12 nmi) south of Sibiu) at an altitude of 1,700 metres (5,577 ft), killing all 28 passengers and 5 crew members. The crew's incorrect approach procedure execution, which led to the aircraft drifting south off course by 20 kilometres (12 mi; 11 nmi), while the wind was increasing turbulence was present.
- On 7 August 1980, a Tupolev Tu-154B-1 registered YR-TPH, operating on an international scheduled flight from Bucharest Otopeni Airport to Nouadhibou Airport, Mauritania ditched in the water 300 metres (984 ft; 328 yd) short of the runway at Nouadhibou Airport. The crew could not see the runway while descending through the 90-metre (300 ft) decision height. A missed approach procedure was initiated when the pilot felt contact with what he thought was ground but was actually water. All of the 152 passengers and 16 crew members survived the impact, but a passenger suffered a heart attack and died before he could be rescued. Most of the passengers were sailors who were going to replace the crew of two Romanian ships located on the Mauritanian coast. Many passengers swam to the land, while sharks were kept away by the vibrations of an engine which continued to function for a few hours after the crash.
- On 5 September 1986, an Antonov An-24 registered YR-AMF operating on a domestic scheduled flight from Bucharest Băneasa Airport touched down nose wheel-first while landing at Cluj Airport. A fire erupted, killing three crew members who were trapped in the cockpit. The other two crew members and all fifty passengers survived.
- On 28 December 1989, during the Romanian Revolution, an Antonov An-24 flying from Bucharest to Belgrade, carrying Sunday Times journalist Ian Henry Parry, was shot down by a missile at Vișina, Dâmbovița. All the people on board (six crew members and the passenger) died.

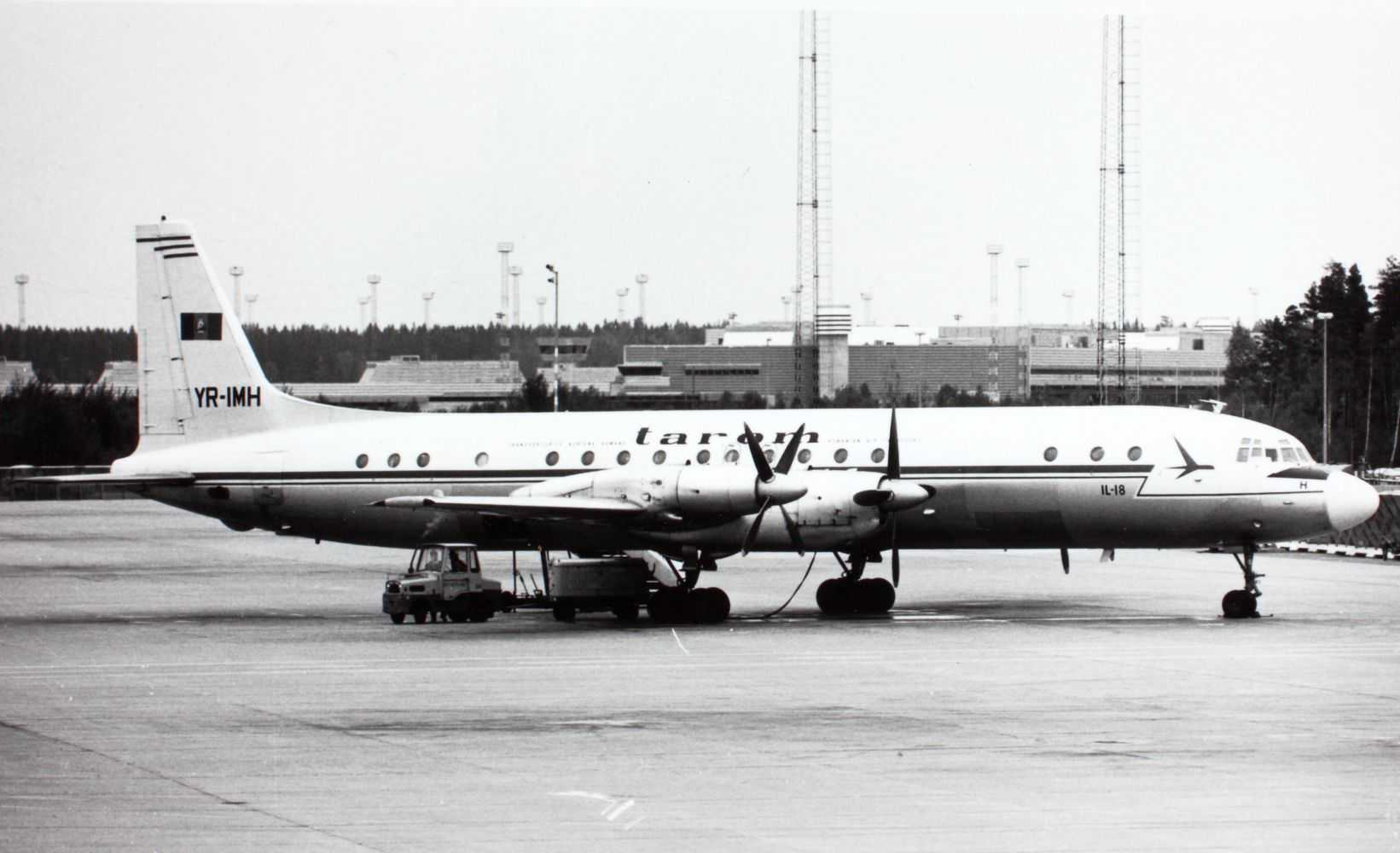
TAROM YR-IMH, the Ilyushin Il-18 that crashed in 1991 near Uricani

- On 13 August 1991, TAROM Flight 785A, an Ilyushin Il-18, flying from Otopeni to Timișoara Airport crashed in the Retezat Mountains during a repositioning flight. The flight crew, and an aircraft maintenance crew, a total of 9 people, died instantly. Whilst the official cause of the crash was attributed to pilot error (the pilots did not use radar instruments and only assumed their positions, thus getting lost), the secrecy regarding the crash sparked a few conspiracy theories, which include sabotage, accidental shootdown from a nearby surface-to-air missiles unit (a theory later dismissed by the MApN), and UFOs that tricked the pilots into believing they had arrived at their destination, linked to the sightings of unusual lights on 4 August 1991.
- On 24 September 1994, TAROM Flight 381, an Airbus A310 registered YR-LCA flying from Bucharest to Paris Orly, went into a sudden and uncommanded nose-up position and stalled. The crew attempted to countermand the aircraft's flight control system but were unable to lower the nose while remaining on course. Witnesses saw the aircraft climb with an extreme nose-up attitude, then bank sharply left, then right, then fall into a steep dive. Only when the dive produced additional speed was the crew able to recover steady flight. An investigation found that an overshoot of flap placard speed during the approach, incorrectly commanded by the captain, caused a mode transition to flight level change. The auto-throttles increased power and trim went full nose-up as a result. The crew's attempt at commanding the nose-down elevator could not counteract the effect of stabilizer nose-up trim, and the resulting dive brought the aircraft from a height of 4,100 feet (1,250 m) at the time of the stall to 800 feet (244 m) when the crew was able to recover command. The aircraft landed safely after a second approach. There were 186 people on board.

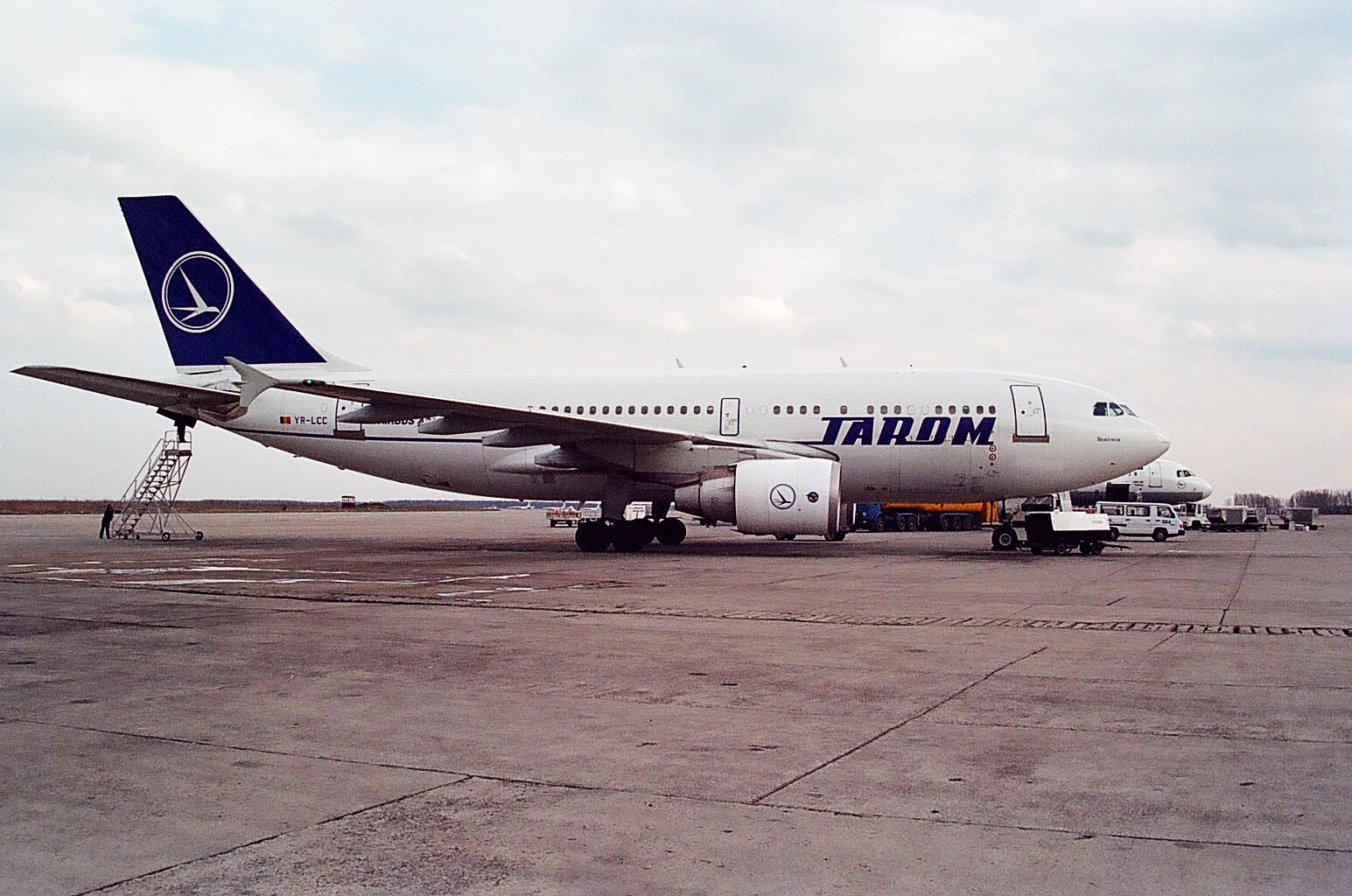
TAROM YR-LCC, the Airbus A310 in 1995 that crashed 4 days later near Bucharest Otopeni Airport

- On 31 March 1995, a TAROM Airbus A310 operating as Flight 371 crashed near Balotești due to a fault in the throttles and lack of recovery from the flight crew, killing all 49 passengers and 11 crew members on board.
- On 30 December 2007, a TAROM Boeing 737-300 (YR-BGC "Constanța"), flying Flight 3107 hit a car on the runway of Bucharest Henri Coandă International Airport while taking off for Sharm-el-Sheikh. The aircraft stopped beside the runway and was severely damaged. None of the passengers were injured. Because of fog, neither the tower nor the pilots saw the car belonging to staff who were repairing a runway beacon.
- On 9 July 2019, a TAROM ATR 42-500 (YR-ATF) burst the tyres of the main landing gear wheels at Bucharest Henri Coandă International Airport while conducting the landing of Flight 638 from Satu Mare. None of the passengers were injured. An internal safety investigation was conducted, with a report being published on 11 September 2019. TAROM's report concluded that the tyre explosions were caused by the parking brakes being engaged on contact with the runway. The brakes locked shortly after contact with the runway. This resulted in the bursting of all four tyres of the main landing wheels. The early engagement of parking brakes were attributed to pilot error. Specifically, poor cockpit resource management (CRM).

== See also ==
- List of companies of Romania
- Aviation in Romania

== Bibliography ==
- Balotescu, Nicolae; Burlacu, Dumitru; Crăciun, Dumitru N.; Dăscălescu, Jean; Dediu, Dumitru; Gheorghiu, Constantin; Ionescu, Corneliu; Mocanu, Vasile; Nicolau, Constantin; Popescu-Rosetti, Ion; Prunariu, Dumitru; Tudose, Stelian; Ucrain, Constantin; Zărnescu, Gheorghe (1984). Istoria Aviației Române [The History of Romanian Aviation] (in Romanian). Bucharest: Editura Științifică și Pedagogică.
