= TAROM Flight 371 =

1995 aviation accident in Romania

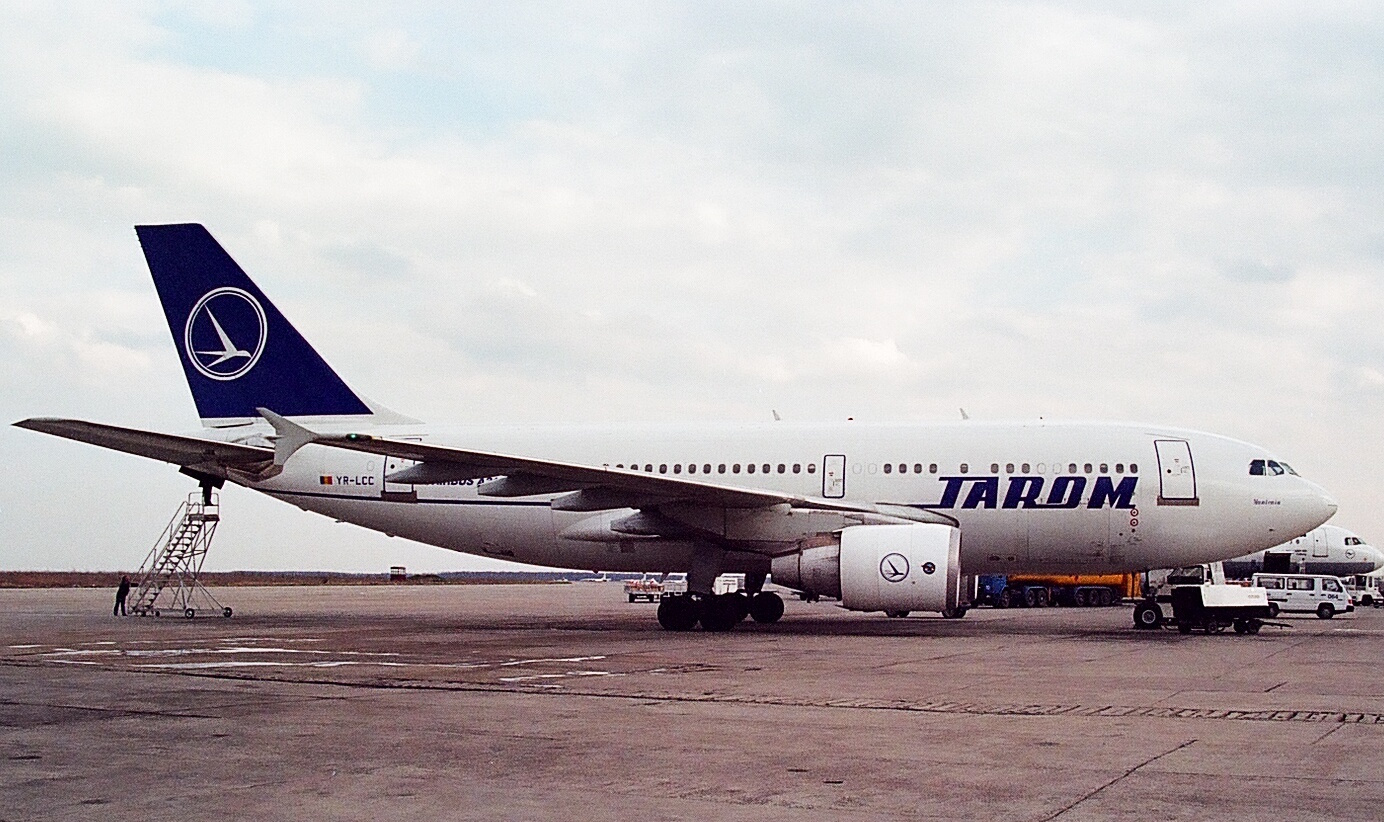
- YR-LCC, the aircraft involved, four days before the accident

Accident
- Date: 31 March 1995
- Summary: Crashed shortly after takeoff; cause disputed
- Site: Balotești, near Henri Coandă International Airport, Bucharest, Romania; 44°35′33″N 26°06′20″E

Aircraft
- Aircraft type: Airbus A310-324
- Aircraft name: Muntenia
- Operator: TAROM
- IATA flight No.: RO371
- ICAO flight No.: ROT371
- Call sign: TAROM 371
- Registration: YR-LCC
- Flight origin: Henri Coandă International Airport, Bucharest, Romania
- Destination: Brussels-Zaventem Airport, Brussels, Belgium
- Occupants: 60
- Passengers: 49
- Crew: 11
- Fatalities: 60
- Survivors: 0

TAROM Flight 371 was a scheduled international passenger flight from Otopeni International Airport in Romania's capital Bucharest to Brussels Airport in Belgium. On 31 March 1995, the Airbus A310 operating flight 371 entered a steep turn and dive shortly after takeoff, crashing near Balotești in Romania, killing all 60 people on board. The flight was operated by TAROM, the flag carrier of Romania.

Investigation of the crash revealed that a faulty autothrottle had reduced the left engine to idle during climb, and coincidentally the captain had become incapacitated (possibly by a heart attack). The First Officer was unable to respond properly to the situation; according to the French BEA, he had confused the attitude direction indicator on the A310 with the one on the Soviet-built planes he was more accustomed to flying, which was different to that on the A310. It was the deadliest plane crash in TAROM's operational history.

== Aircraft ==
The aircraft involved was an Airbus A310-324, built in 1987. TAROM purchased the aircraft and took delivery of it in April 1994, when it was re-registered as YR‑LCC. It was powered by two Pratt & Whitney PW4152 turbofan engines and had logged 31,092 flight hours and 6,216 takeoff and landing cycles.

== Passengers and crew ==
The aircraft was carrying 49 passengers and 11 crew members. Thirty-two of the passengers were from Belgium, nine from Romania, three from the United States, two from Spain, and one each from France, Thailand and the Netherlands.

Passengers and crew on board by nationality
Country	Passengers	Crew	Total
Belgium	32	0	32
Romania	9	11	20
United States	3	0	3
Spain	2	0	2
France	1	0	1
Netherlands	1	0	1
Thailand	1	0	1
Total	49	11	60

The captain of the flight was 48-year-old Liviu Bătănoiu. He had a total of 14,312 flying hours, with 1,735 on the Airbus A310. He graduated from the Aurel Vlaicu Military Aviation School in 1969. His last training on the type was on 12 November 1994 in a Swissair facility in Zurich, Switzerland.

The first officer was 51-year-old Ionel Stoi. He had a total of 8,988 flying hours, 650 on the A310. The A310 was the first and only airplane that he had flown with a Western-style Attitude Direction Indicator (ADI), which works in the opposite way to the ADIs on Soviet-built planes he had spent most of his career flying. He graduated from the Aurel Vlaicu Military Aviation School in 1968. His last simulator training on the type was on 21 September 1994, carried out at a Swissair facility in Zurich.

== Accident ==
TAROM Flight 371 commenced take-off at 09:06:44 local time (06:06:44 UTC) from runway 08R, with First Officer Stoi as the pilot flying. The crew knew about a pre-existing anomaly with the thrust levers, with Captain Bătănoiu stating that he would guard the throttles during the climb. Stoi then asked Bătănoiu to retract the flaps and slats. Bătănoiu retracted the flaps, but failed to retract the slats. Noticing this, Stoi asked his captain what was wrong. After Bătănoiu told First Officer Stoi he felt sick, he groaned then fell silent, apparently having lost consciousness. To make matters worse, the plane's left engine moved itself back into idle, resulting in asymmetric thrust as the right engine remained at climb power. Worse still, the speed of the aircraft began to decrease and the aircraft was banking sharply to the left. Preoccupied with trying to wake Bătănoiu, Stoi did not notice the rapidly increasing left roll.

At 09:08:18, the engine thrust asymmetry reached its maximum value of 0.42 and the aircraft was now banking severely to the left at an angle of 45 degrees. When Stoi realized the deteriorating situation, he reacted instinctively and attempted to engage the autopilot but disengaged seconds later with an audible warning and the aircraft began to lose altitude rapidly. Flight 371 began to dive towards the ground with a continuous thrust reduction on engine no. 2. The aircraft rolled as its airspeed continued to increase. Stoi's inexperience with Western style ADIs and the thick cloud cover led him to not know which way the plane was banking and therefore could not apply sufficient corrective action to recover the aircraft. Upon seeing the no. 1 Engine Pressure Ratio (EPR) gauge at 0.95, he cried out "That one has failed!" At this point, the aircraft was diving with a pitch angle of −61.5 degrees. The aircraft crashed into the ground at 09:08:34 near Balotești at a speed of 324 knots (600 km/h; 373 mph), just 89 seconds after takeoff and 27 seconds after Captain Bătănoiu became incapacitated. The aircraft was completely destroyed on impact, killing everyone on board instantly, and leaving a six-metre-deep (20 ft) crater within the field.

The Bucharest control tower made repeated attempts to contact Flight 371, but to no avail. The tower asked another aircraft flying in the vicinity to contact Flight 371, while requesting that the TAROM dispatcher contact Flight 371 as well. After confirming that Flight 371 had lost all contact, Bucharest control tower issued a "distress phase" on the flight. After a phone call from Balotesti railway station, search and rescue teams identified the crash site.

== Investigation ==
=== Technical investigation ===
Investigators discovered that there was a problem with the autothrottle system (ATS), which controls the throttle of aircraft's engines. During their examination on the aircraft's logbook, they discovered that during the aircraft's climb after takeoff, engine no. 1 had a tendency to go back to idle when switching from take-off power to climb power. The reason was unknown. After maintenance by ground crew, the malfunction did not occur again until 16 March 1995. Nonetheless, the ground crew warned about a possible recurrence of the malfunction. From the aircraft history record obtained from the FAA, a similar malfunction had been reported during its operation with Delta Air Lines. Delta performed the same actions that TAROM did.

Airbus was aware of the ATS malfunction. This defect could cause either the jamming of both throttles and ATS disconnection, or one throttle moving to idle while the other remained above climb power without ATS disconnection. Investigators stated that the most probable cause of this malfunction was due to the excessive friction in the kinematic linkages between the throttle and the ATS coupling units. At the time of the accident, the Flight Crew Operating Manual (FCOM) issued by Airbus did not include the procedures to cope with this anomaly, but the FCOM issued by TAROM and Swissair did include these procedures. The cockpit voice recorder also indicated that it appeared that Captain Bătănoiu had a health problem.

=== Criminal investigation ===
In March 1995, a criminal investigation was started by the Prosecutor's Office attached to the Bucharest Tribunal with the objective of establishing the circumstances of the air crash. In 1997, the case was transferred from the Prosecutor's Office attached to the Bucharest Tribunal to Prosecutor's Office attached to the Bucharest Court of Appeal because of lack of legal competence. Since then, the case remains unsolved and in 2008, at the request of Prosecutor General Laura Codruța Kövesi, it has been revealed that the case files were completely missing.

== Memorials ==
A monument dedicated to the memory of the ones who perished in the accident is located in the vicinity of the crash site.

== In popular culture ==
In 2019, the accident was featured in the 6th episode of the 19th season of Mayday and Air Crash Investigation. The episode is titled "Fatal Climb" and premiered on 24 January 2019.

== See also ==
- List of accidents and incidents involving commercial aircraft
- Manx2 Flight 7100, an accident where pilots mismanaged asymmetrical thrust on a Fairchild Metroliner, leading to a roll
- Crossair Flight 498, another accident where a pilot confused a Western style ADI with Soviet style ADI
- Sriwijaya Air Flight 182, a crash of a Boeing 737 that was also caused by an autothrottle malfunction
