= Sriwijaya Air Flight 182 =

2021 aviation accident in the Java Sea

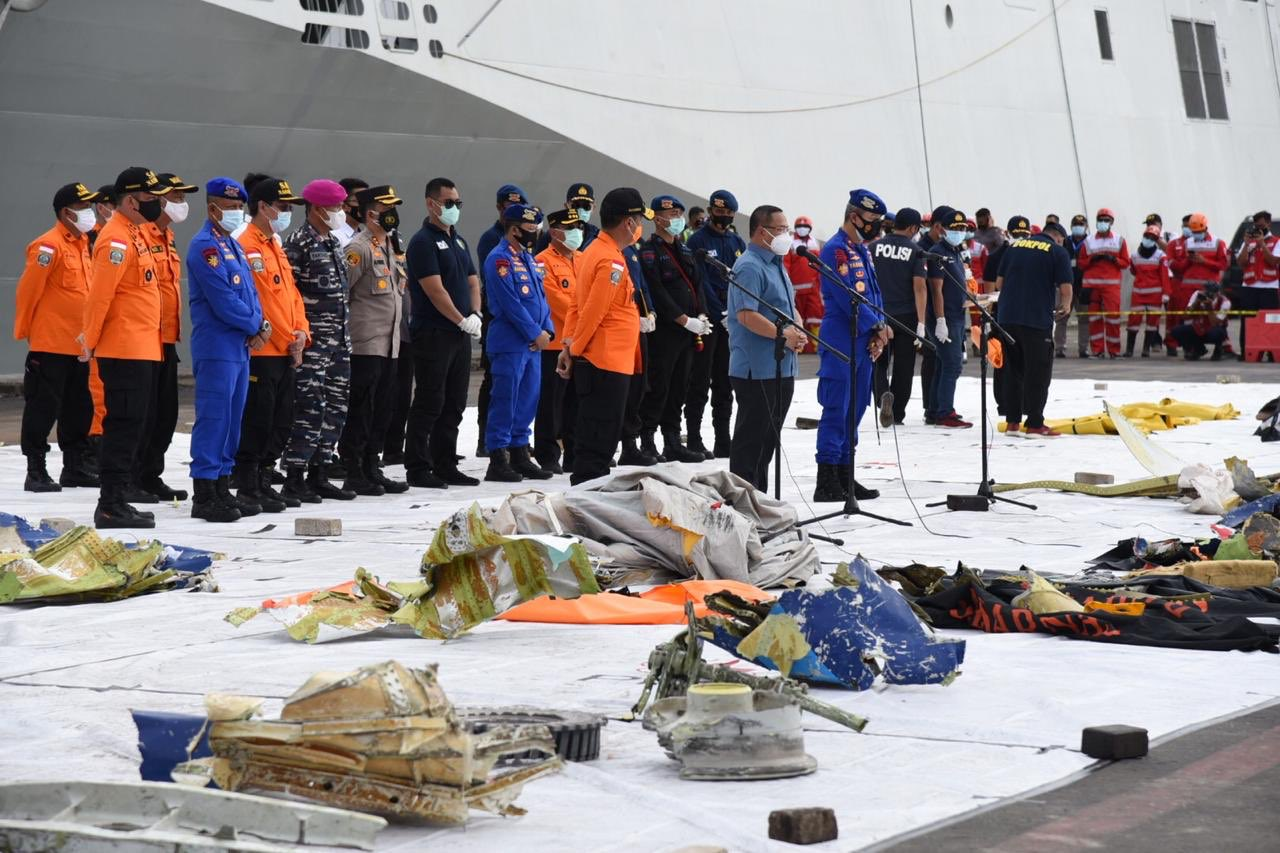
- Recovered aircraft debris at a BASARNAS press conference

Accident
- Date: 9 January 2021
- Summary: Crashed into the sea; mishandling of faulty autothrottle leading to loss of control
- Site: Near Laki Island, Thousand Islands, Java Sea; 5°57′50″S 106°34′28″E

Aircraft
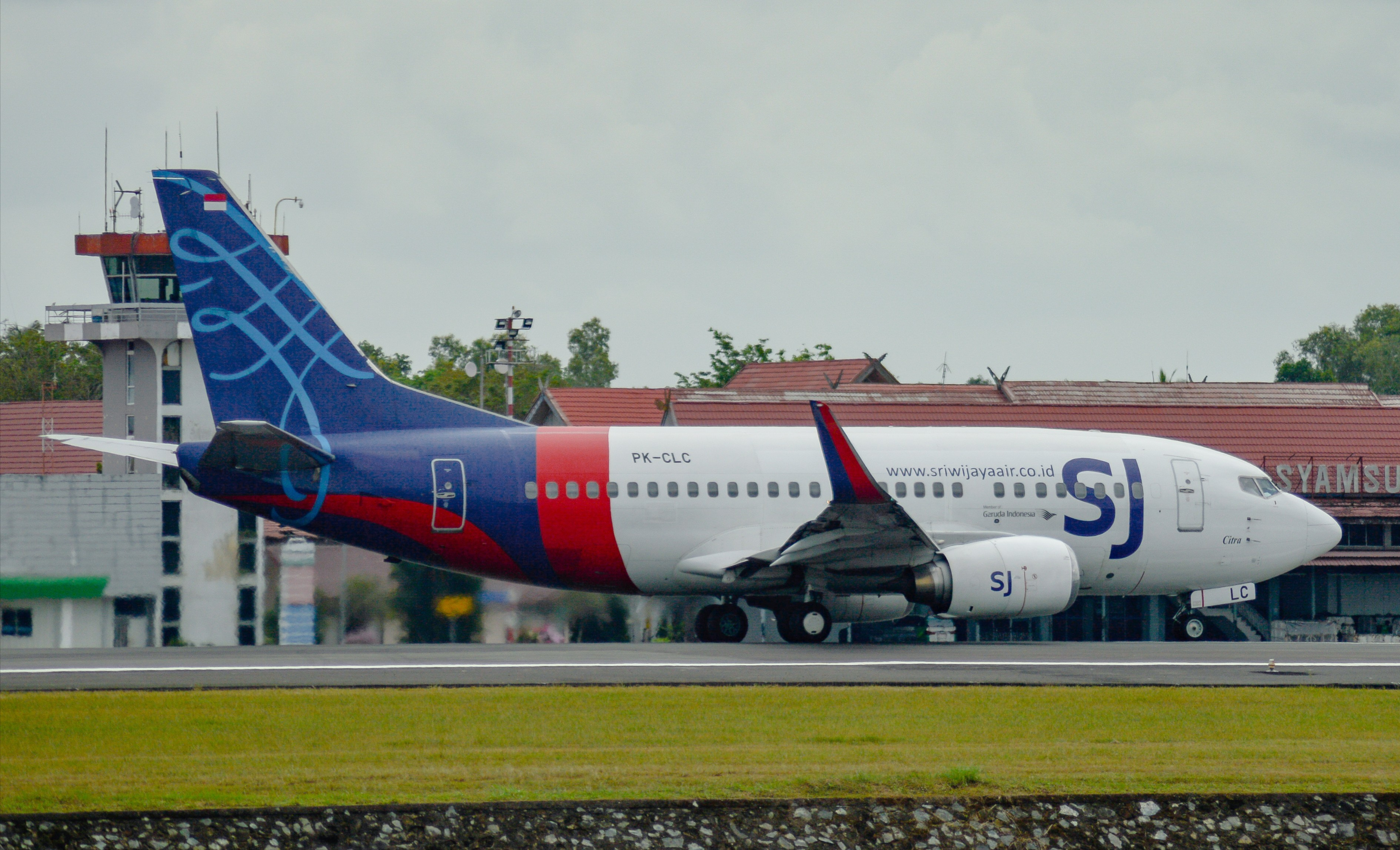
- PK-CLC, the aircraft involved in the accident, seen in 2019
- Aircraft type: Boeing 737-524
- Aircraft name: Citra
- Operator: Sriwijaya Air
- IATA flight No.: SJ182
- ICAO flight No.: SJY182
- Call sign: SRIWIJAYA 182
- Registration: PK-CLC
- Flight origin: Soekarno–Hatta International Airport, Tangerang, Indonesia
- Destination: Supadio International Airport, Pontianak, West Kalimantan, Indonesia
- Occupants: 62
- Passengers: 50
- Crew: 12
- Fatalities: 62
- Survivors: 0

Sriwijaya Air Flight 182 was a scheduled domestic passenger flight from Jakarta to Pontianak, Indonesia. Just four minutes after departing from Soekarno–Hatta International Airport on 9 January 2021, the Boeing 737-500 entered an upset and crashed into the Java Sea off the Thousand Islands, killing all 62 people on board. A search of the area recovered wreckage, human remains, and items of clothing. The flight data recorder was recovered on 12 January, and the data storage module of the cockpit voice recorder was recovered on 30 March. Flight 182 was the deadliest plane crash in 2021.

During the search, Indonesia's National Transportation Safety Committee (NTSC) used the available data from Flightradar24, and hypothesised that the plane's engines were still operating upon impact. It was known that the autothrottle on this aircraft had malfunctioned a few days earlier, and one line of investigation was whether this might have contributed to the accident.

A preliminary report released on 10 February 2021 suggested problems with the plane's autothrottle; the thrust lever for the left engine reduced thrust as the aircraft climbed, while the thrust lever for the right engine remained fixed. On 10 November 2022, the NTSC published the final report of the investigation, concluding that the crash had been caused by a combination of a faulty autothrottle, pilot error and inadequate training.

== Background ==
=== Aircraft ===
The aircraft involved was a Boeing 737-524, registered as PK-CLC (c/n 27323, Line no.2616). It was equipped with two CFM International CFM56-3B1 engines. At the time of the accident, the aircraft had accumulated 62,983 hours and 40,383 cycles.

The aircraft was manufactured in 1994, and was delivered to Continental Airlines in May 1994 under the registration N27610. The aircraft was transferred to United Airlines in 2010 after Continental and United merged. It was sold to Sriwijaya Air in May 2012, the first of fifteen 737-500s received by Sriwijaya Air that year to replace their 737-200s. Sriwijaya Air named the aircraft Citra.

Between March and December 2020, the aircraft was stored at Surabaya Juanda International Airport due to reduced demand for air travel during the coronavirus pandemic. The Ministry of Transportation inspected the aircraft on 14 December 2020 and issued a new certificate of airworthiness three days later. It resumed service on 19 December 2020.

=== Passengers and crew ===
There were 62 people on board, of who 50 were revenue passengers (43 adults and 7 children). Of the 12 crew members, six were operating crew on the flight, while the other six were deadheading as passengers. The majority of the passengers were residents from West Kalimantan.

Among the passengers were Mulyadi Tamsir, a politician from the People's Conscience Party (Hanura) and chairman of the Indonesian Muslim Student Association.

The crew on the flight consisted of Captain Afwan, 54, (Note: Afwan is a mononym (one-word name), which is common for Indonesian names.) who had over 17,904 hours of flight experience, including 9,023 hours on the Boeing 737, First Officer Diego Mamahit, 34, who had over 5,107 hours of flight experience, with 4,957 of them on the Boeing 737, and four flight attendants. Afwan was a former pilot in the Indonesian Air Force.

The six deadheading crew and several revenue passengers had transferred to Flight 182 from an earlier NAM Air flight that did not operate. (NAM Air is a subsidiary of Sriwijaya).

== Flight timeline ==
Flight data
Top: Route of Flight 182, according to ADS-B Exchange
Bottom: Altitude-speed graph of Flight 182

Flight 182 was scheduled to depart from Soekarno–Hatta International Airport at 13:40 WIB (06:40 UTC), and to arrive at Supadio International Airport in Pontianak, West Kalimantan, at 15:00 WIB (08:00 UTC). Departure was delayed by monsoon rains, and Flight 182 took off from runway 25R at 14:36 local time (07:36 UTC). Due to the delay, it was expected to land in Pontianak at 15:50 WIB (08:50 UTC).

The aircraft departed on a standard instrument departure with a clearance to climb to 29,000 ft (8,800 m). After being instructed by the ATC to pause their ascent at 11,000 feet (3,400 m), Captain Afwan entered the revised altitude into the autopilot. To level the aircraft off, the autothrottle attempted to move the levers back. While the left lever moved backwards, the right lever remained stuck at climb power due to excessive friction in the throttle control cable.

The aircraft was in a right turn, with the autopilot using the ailerons and spoilers to bank the aircraft to the right. But as the left lever kept decreasing while the right lever was still at climb power, thrust asymmetry caused the aircraft to start turning (yawing and rolling) to the left. The autopilot tried to keep the right bank going by deflecting the control surfaces to their maximum extent, but the thrust asymmetry continued to increase until it overpowered the autopilot. In the space of 68 seconds the aircraft rolled from a bank angle of 20 degrees right wing down to wings level, and after a further 15 seconds it was banked 37 degrees to the left. The pilots apparently did not notice the change of the aircraft's bank angle. The pilots had a few minor distractions at this point - a standard checklist to follow at 10,000', levelling off at 11,000' and almost immediately being cleared to 13,000' - but none of these activities should have taken their attention away from the task of monitoring the aircraft's flight path using the electronic attitude indicator ("artificial horizon").

When the bank angle reached 37 degrees, the Bank Angle warning sounded, startling the pilots. Because the autopilot was still holding the control wheel to the right, Captain Afwan probably assumed they were overbanked to the right, and instinctively yanked the wheel back to the left and disengaged the autopilot. In fact, the aircraft was actually overbanked to the left because of the asymmetric thrust - which the pilots were still unaware of - and the autopilot was resisting that tendency. The captain's hasty action ran counter to his training, which taught that pilots should first assess the situation by reference to their instruments before deciding how to recover the aircraft.

When the autopilot was disconnected, the crew lost any protection it had been giving them, and with Captain Afwan's left turn input, the aircraft banked through its maximum allowable bank angle and rolled through 90 degrees to the left. The nose dropped and the aircraft descended, inverted, towards the Java Sea. First Officer Mamahit shouted to Captain Afwan regarding the bank angle, warning him that the aircraft had entered an upset condition. Realizing his mistake, Captain Afwan pulled the yoke back and attempted to recover from the dive. Due to being inverted, his action led to an increased rate of descent, and the aircraft dropped by 10,000 ft (3,000 m) in less than a minute.

Captain Afwan managed to almost level the wings and pull the nose up to a nearly 0-degree angle, but by then there was no more room for recovery as the altitude was too low and the aircraft was in overspeed condition. The aircraft crashed belly-first into the Java Sea near Laki Island and 19 km (12 mi) from Soekarno–Hatta International Airport, less than five minutes after takeoff. There were no survivors. During its climb, Flight 182 went off course to the northwest. Air traffic control (ATC) asked the crew about the deviation and got no response. A few seconds later, the aircraft dropped off radar. There was no distress call during the flight.

== Search and recovery ==
The crash site was located 11 nmi (20 km) from Soekarno-Hatta International Airport.

Personnel from a vessel provided by the Ministry of Transportation recovered body parts, fragments of clothing, electronics, personal belongings and wreckage from the sea near the Thousand Islands, with aviation fuel also reported around the location.

The National Search and Rescue Agency (Indonesian: BASARNAS) immediately deployed personnel to the crash site while the National Police and the Ministry of Transportation set up crisis centres in Port of Tanjung Priok and Soekarno–Hatta International Airport. The Indonesian Navy deployed a number of vessels for the search and rescue operations, in addition to helicopters and KOPASKA (frogman) personnel.

The Indonesian government requested assistance from the South Korean government with the search. Through the Korea - Indonesia Marine Technology Cooperation Research Center (MTCRC), the South Korean Ministry of Oceans and Fisheries deployed a research vessel equipped with a detector to Indonesia. At least 15 personnel from MTCRC were also sent. The Singaporean government also provided assistance in the search.

KOPASKA showing efforts to search the remains

Wreckage of aircraft

Rescuers recovered a life vest, pieces from the aircraft's fuselage, and a destroyed wheel rim from the Boeing 737. Most of the wreckage was found at a depth of 17–23 metres (56–75 ft). On the night of 9 January, an emergency slide from the aircraft was recovered from the waters near Lancang Island, Thousand Islands. The scattered debris and the small pieces of the wreckage indicated a high-speed impact. Much more wreckage was found over the next few days.

The Indonesian Navy pinpointed the exact coordinates of the crash site on 10 January, and the flight data recorder was retrieved two days later. The casing of the cockpit voice recorder was recovered on 15 January but the data storage module inside was missing. The search for victims and aircraft debris continued until 21 January. A total of 122 pieces of debris were recovered from the crash site, including one of the engine turbines. The search for the data storage module of the CVR continued until it was dredged up from the seabed on 30 March.

== Investigation ==
The NTSC was immediately notified of the accident, with assistance from BASARNAS. NTSC stated that starting on 10 January 2021, just before 06:00 local time, search and rescue personnel would start searching for the aircraft's flight recorders. It added that the investigation will be assisted by the United States' National Transportation Safety Board (NTSB), with the Singaporean Transport Safety Investigation Bureau also offering assistance with the investigation. On 10 January, NTSC obtained raw data of the aircraft's flight path from radar and interviews with the air traffic controller. Investigators also retrieved the transcript of communications between the pilots and ATC.

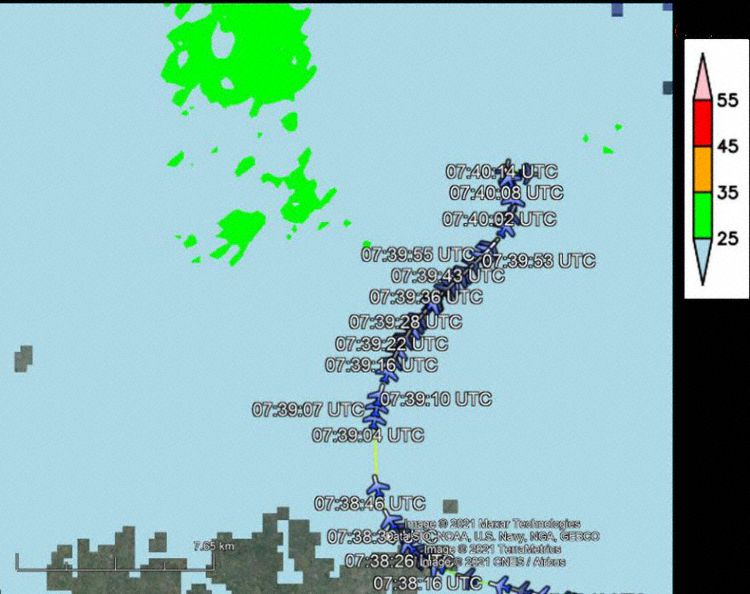
Superimposed ADS-B flight profile and weather data from BMKG

Weather data retrieved from the Meteorology, Climatology, and Geophysical Agency (BMKG) confirmed the presence of moderate to heavy rain during takeoff with chance of thunderstorms reported. The data later showed that a 15 km (9.3 mi) high cumulonimbus cloud was present around Soekarno-Hatta International Airport with the minimum temperature of the cloud tops at −70 °C (−94 °F), prompting speculation that the aircraft had encountered turbulence. Visibility was estimated to be between 6 km (3.7 mi) and 10 km (6.2 mi). Analysis by the Indonesian National Institute of Aeronautics and Space (LAPAN) showed that weather conditions were not extreme. LAPAN stated that a meso-convective system had been formed near the Java Sea at 11:00 WIB (04:00 UTC), but the system had already dissipated by the time Flight 182 took off. According to NTSC, there was no indication that there would be any significant cloud on the aircraft's flight route. NTSC confirmed, however, that the pilots had contacted Jakarta ATC to change its heading to 075 degrees due to bad weather.

An investigator with NTSC stated that based on the distribution of the debris, the aircraft possibly ruptured when it hit the water. Combining Flightradar24 data and the shape of the engine turbine's fan blade and turbine disc, NTSC speculated that the aircraft's engines were still operating upon impact; based on the evidence, the aircraft was still responsive at 250 feet (76 m).

There was a public concern that the aircraft was not airworthy. The Federal Aviation Administration initially had issued an Airworthiness Directive to Boeing 737-500 operators concerning fatigue cracking on the left nacelle support overwing fitting flange fastener hole. The director of Sriwijaya Air, Jefferson Irwin Jauwena, insisted that the aircraft was airworthy. Moreover, the Ministry of Transportation later examined the aircraft's airworthiness and determined that the aircraft was safe to fly.

An Indonesian aviation expert said that the aircraft had been stored for repairs by Sriwijaya Air between 23 March and 23 October 2020. However, other experts speculated that the long time spent inactive may have caused deterioration and that technical problems may have developed.

On 15 January 2021, NTSC announced that the data from the FDR have been successfully downloaded. A total of 330 parameters were being examined and analysed by investigators. A Reuters report said that the data extracted, such as flight path, speed and engine condition, were "in good condition."

The preliminary report was released on 10 February 2021.

Data from the CVR was downloaded and included the accident flight, although it transpired that the captain's microphone was not recorded and the cockpit area microphone was all but inaudible due to interference.

The investigation conducted simulations of the accident based on the FDR and CVR data in flight training simulator. The first simulation attempt was conducted at the Las Vegas Flight Academy in Henderson, Nevada, on 27 October 2021. It was found that the simulator did not react similarly to the accident flight during an asymmetric thrust event. The simulation revealed that the thrust lever console was not closely monitored by the pilots. The investigation repeated the simulation session in NAM Training Center in Jakarta on 7 December 2021 and successfully recreated the accident flight. However, some objectives could not be achieved due to the difference in configuration between the simulator and the accident aircraft.

On 17 January 2022, the NTSC released its first interim statement.

=== Maintenance issue ===
NTSC examined the aircraft's maintenance logs, and discovered that problems with the autothrottle system had been reported by pilots 65 times in the eight years before the crash, 32 of them related to unintended disengagement of the autothrottle in mid-flight. Pilots also filed 69 reports regarding problems with the autopilot and 61 complaints related to differences in engine parameters reading, all of which occurred throughout the aircraft's operation with Sriwijaya Air. In the majority of cases, engineers started by cleaning the electrical connector of the autothrottle components, and then tested the system using the built-in test equipment (BITE). In every case, the BITE test showed that there were no faults remaining. However, as the issue continued to occur during flight, it was clear to investigators that the problems were not caused by dirty cable connectors. The two most recent occurrences of autpilot problems were reported by two separate crews on 3rd and 4th January. On both these occasions, the electrical connectors were cleaned and, on completion of a successful BITE test, the aircraft was returned to service.

The investigation was focused on the faulty autothrottle system as multiple parameters from the FDR indicated that an abnormality had occurred in the system. NTSC later stated that the committee had sent 13 aircraft components, including the aircraft's autothrottle system, to United States and United Kingdom for further examination.

The maintenance logbook of the aircraft revealed that there had been recurring problems on the Mach/Airspeed indicator and the auto-throttle system of the aircraft. The Mach/Airspeed indicator was eventually replaced on 4 January, while the auto-throttle system was fixed on 5 January. The FDR data, however, confirmed that the auto-throttle had malfunctioned again on 9 January, the day of the accident. While the aircraft was climbing through 10,000 ft, the left engine thrust lever continued to decrease, while the thrust lever on the right engine remained in place. When the aircraft reached 10,000 ft, an aircraft upset happened. The autopilot disengaged and the aircraft rolled to the left with a bank angle of more than 45 degrees. A few seconds later, the auto-throttle then disengaged.

Although there was a wide range of problems with the autothrottle systems, during the 9 January accident flight the problem that occurred on board was a difference in the engine parameter readings showing distinctly different thrust lever positions as the left lever continued to move backwards while the right lever stayed in position. Normally, both levers move simultaneously to prevent thrust asymmetry from occurring. The frozen-in-place right lever was particularly noted by investigators as there were multiple reports of the same problem on earlier flights. These included reports of difficulties in moving the right lever and also lack of robust response from that lever.

As the right lever in the accident flight did not move back simultaneously with the left lever, it was suspected that the source was related to friction forces in the thrust control cable. The connection between the servo motor and the thrust levers was suspected as the source of this problem, indicating a possible weak linkage between both components. The high friction forces eventually tripped the autothrottle torque switch, a feature that allows the pilots to override the autothrottle command. As the torque switch was accidentally opened, the autothrottle could not provide input to the lever and the lever eventually stopped moving in its track. Since it was only the right lever that had high friction and weak linkage, the left lever continued to move backwards, as the autothrottle was not overridden.

Although the linkage between the servo motor and the thrust lever could not be recovered due to the severity of the impact, this theory was deemed to be the most plausible cause of the problem with the right lever, as evidence from other tests did not support other hypotheses.

=== Thrust asymmetry ===
Thrust asymmetry in the Boeing 737 would normally be detected by the Cruise Thrust Split Monitor (CTSM), which would have immediately deactivated the autothrottle, but the accident aircraft's system did not operate correctly. The FDR recording showed that the CTSM system activated while the aircraft was diving towards the sea, instead of earlier during the climb, when the asymmetry had appeared for the first time. By the time the CTSM became active, the pilots had lost their control of the aircraft.

The investigation concluded that the most plausible cause of the delayed activation of the CTSM was due to the low signal value that had been emitted by the spoiler position sensor on the right side. This was evidenced by the timing of the authothrottle disengagement, which happened immediately after Captain Afwan commanded a bank angle over 19 degrees, the maximum allowable input for the autopilot. Prior to the disengagement, the autopilot made an input of 19 degrees to the right. Even though that condition had met all the required criteria for the activation of the CTSM, the autothrottle was still engaged as the signal that the CTSM had been receiving was lower than 2.5 degrees of spoiler deflection, causing it to not activate. After Captain Afwan added another bank angle input, which was greater than the allowed autopilot command, the signal sent a spoiler deflection value of greater than 2.5, causing the CTSM to turn on and disengaging the autothrottle. This was further proven by the fact that the exact same thing had happened during the 15 March incident. On that flight, the pilot also made an input greater than the allowed maximum bank angle that the autopilot could command, causing the CTSM to activate and disconnect the autothrottle.

This could not be confirmed by investigators as they could not recover the essential components. They suspected that the aircraft might have either suffered an erroneous spoiler sensor, damaged spoiler linkage or improperly rigged sensor. Sriwijaya Air stated that they had never rigged the flight spoiler sensor as there was lack of requirement to inspect the sensor and that they had never had a requirement to do so.

=== Previous incident ===
After a review of the aircraft's QAR (Quick Access Recorders), a system established by Sriwijaya Air to regularly download the content of flight recorders for monitoring purposes, it was discovered that the anomaly had happened to other flights before the crash. One flight was particularly noted for its striking similarities. On 15 March 2020, captain Afwan commanded a flight during which the left lever moved back, while the right lever stayed in place, creating a thrust asymmetry that pulled the aircraft to the left. Fighting to maintain the course, the autopilot turned the yoke to the right and put the aircraft to the maximum allowed bank angle that could be commanded by the autopilot. The pilots were initially unaware of the anomaly and the autopilot kept fighting the unwanted turn until it got overpowered by the asymmetric thrust. In the 15 March incident, however, both pilots became aware of the situation and successfully recovered the aircraft. Despite the seriousness of the incident, neither captain Afwan nor his co-pilot reported the incident to Sriwijaya Air.

=== Pilot error ===
Even though the aircraft had difficulties with the autothrottle system, this alone was not severe enough to cause the crash, as pilots are supposed to have been trained to handle these kinds of situations. The thrust asymmetry that occurred on board was a subtle but progressive failure that should be noticed by pilots, as there was enough time for the pilots to be aware of the evolving situation. The aircraft also should not have entered an upset condition. Other than the autothrottle and systems related to the aircraft's automation, the maintenance logbook indicated that there were no known defects on the other vital components such as the attitude indicator.

During the flight, the aircraft started to head off course by banking to the left instead of the right. While climbing past 10,450 feet, the wing position changed from right turn to level position. After rolling through the level position, the left wing began to sink further. For a period of 6 seconds, the bank angle increased to 7 degrees to the left. Normally, this would have been immediately noticed by the crew, but the pilots did not react until the bank angle warning began to sound several seconds later, indicating that the bank angle had exceeded the safe limit. The pilots had enough time to recognize this condition. Had the pilots actively monitored the attitude indicator and maintained situational awareness they would have immediately corrected the bank angle.

NTSC identified several factors that might have influenced the pilots' decreased situational awareness during the flight. Among the first was the fact that the aircraft was flying into clouds, based on the communication between ATC and the crew, as well as weather data from the area of the crash. The pilots had informed ATC about their intention to change heading due to the presence of storm system on their route. The Indonesian meteorology office, BMKG, stated that the visibility at the time was around 6 - 10 km and that it was cloudy. It is likely that they were operating in cloud, requiring an upset recovery on instruments.

Despite the lack of external visual cues, the onboard electronic attitude indicator was functioning normally and could still be used as reference. The investigation suspected that the pilots might have become too reliant on the autopilot system. After pressing the autopilot button, the autopilot turned the yoke to the right, heading to the correct course of the flight. By seeing the yoke that was turning to the right, the pilots assumed that the aircraft was also banking to the right. The pilots thought that the autopilot was working as intended and thus decided to turn their attention to other procedures, such as communication and altitude. The importance of monitoring their route and attitude were ignored, as they thought that the autopilot and autothrottle were operating normally. The phenomenon was described as confirmation bias. Meanwhile, as the asymmetry progressed, the autopilot could not turn the yoke further and eventually became overpowered.

By not monitoring the attitude of the aircraft, the aircraft turned to the left unnoticed until its warning system alerted the crew about the dangerous bank angle. In order to level the aircraft, Captain Afwan should have turned the yoke to the right. Instead, he turned the yoke further to the left. Apparently, as the autopilot had been turning the yoke to the right, Captain Afwan thought that the aircraft was banking dangerously to the right and instinctively turned the yoke to the left. His input eventually caused the aircraft to enter an upset condition with a bank angle of more than 90 degrees. Captain Afwan eventually made the situation worse by pulling the nose up even though the wings were not levelled, causing the aircraft to dive towards the ocean with a rate of descent of at least 45,000 ft per minute. With little room for recovery, the crew could not prevent the aircraft from impacting the water.

The discovery of Captain Afwan's failure in a basic skill such as the Upset Prevention and Recovery Training (UPRT) sparked concern and a more detailed investigation into the training program that he had been following during his career. The examination noted that he had undergone an upset and recovery training in May 2019, as part of a mandatory training implemented by Sriwijaya Air, with the result being described as "satisfactory". There were several notes regarding the need to improve on certain areas, such as standard callouts and several other procedures.

The investigation further discovered that the UPRT training that the crew had taken for the flight was lacking in detail, leading the NTSC to investigate the training system at Sriwijaya Air further.

=== Safety culture ===
While there were some shortcomings in Captain Afwan's personal skill as a pilot, the investigation into the training of pilots and the maintenance management in Sriwijaya Air led to the discovery of larger problems regarding the safety culture within the company.

Following the discovery of subpar training within the airline's syllabus, NTSC opted to conduct a first-hand inspection of the pilot training related to upset and recovery at the Sriwijaya Air training centre. While observing the pre-simulator briefing, it was revealed that Sriwijaya Air had modified some of the standard callouts, such as the "nose low upset" to "upset brown" and "nose high upset" to "upset blue". They also had modified some of the standard procedures for an upset recovery by adding additional irrelevant tasks for the pilot monitoring (PM) during the recovery, including the requirement for pilots to announce an upset condition and to initiate mayday calls before assisting the pilot flying (PF). These modifications were adopted without prior consultation with the Indonesian aviation authorities. During the session, the training instructor failed to emphasize certain steps and did not explain its importance. The instructor also missed several important training points, such as common mistakes in upset recovery, recommended strategies for aircraft upset and could not explain the importance of upset and recovery training to the NTSC.

The simulation of the upset and recovery training further showed deficiencies in the quality of Sriwijaya Air's pilot training. Due to the addition of irrelevant tasks to the PM during upset recovery attempt, the PM could not assist the PF in monitoring crucial information such as the aircraft's airspeed and altitude. In one of the training sessions, the trainee caused the aircraft to enter an accelerated stall condition, due to improper action during recovery. The instructor eventually had to intervene to correct their mistakes.

Looking further into UPRT in Indonesian aviation industry, the investigation found that there was also problem with the national implementation of the UPRT. Despite being made mandatory in 2017, the UPRT requirements were not explained in detail and the national standard had not been used as guidance or as a reference for airlines to use. Investigators stated that this might have contributed to Sriwijaya Air's inadequate and ineffective UPRT program.

Other than the training, the NTSC also pointed out other deficiencies within Sriwijaya Air's safety and maintenance management system. Review of the aircraft's maintenance logbook revealed that the autothrottle issue had never appeared until the aircraft was acquired by Indonesia's Sriwijaya Air. When it did appear, the engineer did not rectify it properly. The repeated use of BITE tests alone were indicative of a problematic maintenance culture within the airline. The NTSC stated that this practice was used by the engineers because it was thought to be easy, but by doing so it didn't eliminate the root-cause of the defect. Sriwijaya Air had already put a system in place to make sure that maintenance practices would be reviewed and monitored regularly to prevent recurring defects. The involved aircraft, however, suffered the exact same defects for nearly eight years, proving that there was lack of supervision of maintenance practices within Sriwijaya Air.

The NTSC also noted the pilots' action after the 15 March 2020 incident, in particular that they did not report the incident to Sriwijaya Air. The incident was regarded by the NTSC as serious, but both pilots failed to report it and did not write up the technical difficulties during the flight in the maintenance logbook. This same pattern was also discovered with the other pilots during the other thrust asymmetry incidents. Despite the seriousness, none of the pilots had reported the incidents to Sriwijaya Air.

To ensure that the prevailing safety procedures were followed properly, Sriwijaya Air had established the Flight Data Analysis Program (FDAP), which was responsible for monitoring events that were critical to the safety of the flight. Among those monitored were incidences of excessive bank angle and thrust asymmetry. FDAP would analyze the problems after receiving reports from the crew. NTSC, however, stated that the hazard-reporting system had not been well implemented or emphasized to each Sriwijaya Air employee. Reviews of the reports that had been received from the FDAP revealed that the majority of the reports had been made by ground personnel, while pilots rarely reported aircraft technical difficulties. Flight dispatchers had never filed any reports to the FDAP.

Sriwijaya Air safety management was criticized in the findings. The airlines' Quality, Safety and Security Department (QSS) was noted as having failed in its role. An assessment in November 2019 managed to identify nine out of 10 risks that were deemed "intolerable". The NTSC investigation suggested that, even after two years, there had been no attempt to reduce any of the nine intolerable risks to a tolerable level.

The investigation concluded that there had been inadequate implementation and multiple issues related to safety management in Sriwijaya Air, which contributed to the crash of Flight 182.

=== Final report ===
The final report was published on 10 November 2022. It concluded that the crash had been caused by asymmetrical thrust setting due to a faulty autothrottle system. A feature central to the immediate deactivation of the autothrottle, the Cruise Thrust Split Monitor (CTSM), failed to work properly due to signal interference from the aircraft's spoilers, causing the thrust asymmetry to increase. The aircraft turned left instead of right as intended and eventually entered an upset condition. Lack of upset and recovery training contributed to the pilots' inability to prevent and recover from the upset condition.

== Responses ==
=== Immediate aftermath ===
In the immediate aftermath of the accident, the state's insurance company Jasa Raharja announced that it would compensate the relatives of the passengers and crew members aboard Flight 182. Each next-of-kin of the deceased would receive Rp 50 million (US$3,530). Minister of Social Affairs Tri Rismaharini announced that her ministry would give Rp 15 million (US$1,060) for each victim for compensation.

Delegations from Indonesia's House of Representatives visited the operation centre in Tanjung Priok. They later announced that the House would hold talks with the Ministry of Transportation about the accident. They also stated that they would hold talks with BMKG, Sriwijaya Air and NTSC. The Indonesian House of Representatives will scrutinize the operation of conduct of the Indonesian Ministry of Transportation regarding supervision of airliners' compliance with the aircraft's maintenance manual. A full evaluation of every airliner in Indonesia was later ordered.

=== Memorial ===
The Regent of Thousand Islands, Junaedi, stated that the government of Thousand Islands will build a monument dedicated to the victims of Flight 182 on Lancang Island. On 22 January 2021, family and loved ones of the victims were invited to spread flowers approximately where the plane had crashed. Prior to the event, the director of Sriwijaya Air expressed condolences to the victims.

=== Aviation safety ===
The crash of Flight 182 and the subsequent investigation brought the safety of Indonesian aviation under scrutiny, highlighting the poor safety record of the nation's aviation industry. With 697 fatalities in the past decade alone, the Aviation Safety Network stated that Indonesia had the deadliest aviation market in the world.

During the course of the investigation, Sriwijaya Air attempted to improve several company operational areas. Prior to the publication of the interim report, the airline included a more thorough UPRT program in the pilot training syllabus and disseminated the Boeing Flight Operation Technical Bulletin regarding UPRT, improved recurrent engineer training, revised the current Flight Data Analysis system, and performed further evaluations in other areas that had been deemed insufficient by investigators. Following the publication of the interim report, the airline gave further updates on the progress of their UPRT program, performed thorough autothrottle and spoiler inspections on the airline's Boeing 737 fleet, and also revised the company's FDAP and maintenance manual.

The findings related to UPRT prompted the Indonesian government to set up a task force for UPRT implementation. On 25 June 2021, the government approved the formation of the task force. The task force was assigned the creation of guidance, regulations, and implementation of UPRT throughout Indonesia, including consultations with internationally recognized experts on the matter. The implementation plan was successfully reviewed on 8 October and the proposed UPRT plan was completed by 21 October 2021.

In the aftermath of the crash, Boeing issued a technical direction on the possible failure on the wiring of the aircraft's flap indication system and the aircraft's related autothrottle system. Operators of the affected aircraft were mandated to conduct an inspection on their aircraft's autothrottle and wiring of the flap indication system within 250 hours after the issuance of the directive. The FAA then followed Boeing's bulletin and issued an airworthiness directive related to the findings. Boeing later announced that they would develop a service bulletin to provide additional guidance related to flap inspection.

On 25 March 2022, Boeing issued the revised maintenance planning document for the Boeing 737 series that required repetitive inspections on the spoiler and aileron deployment and associated position sensors.

== In popular culture ==
The accident was featured in season 25, episode 3 of the Canadian documentary series Mayday, titled "Power Struggle".

== See also ==
- List of accidents and incidents involving commercial aircraft
- List of accidents and incidents involving the Boeing 737
- List of aviation accidents and incidents in Indonesia
- Similar accidents and incidents:
  - Adam Air Flight 574(similar upset situation caused by a faulty INS and pilot error)
  - TAM Transportes Aéreos Regionais Flight 402 (thrust reverser failure and lack of crew training leading to crash on take-off, 99 killed), 1996
  - TAROM Flight 371 (auto-throttle failure and pilot incapacitation, 60 killed), 1995
  - China Southern Airlines Flight 3943 (thrust failure and pilot error, 141 killed), 1992
