= Ian Parry =

British photojournalist

Ian Parry

Ian Parry (12 April 1965 – 28 December 1989) was a British photographer and photojournalist who worked as a freelance and on assignment for newspapers including The Mail on Sunday, The Times and The Sunday Times. He was killed at the age of 24 in an aircraft crash in Romania during the overthrow of Communism. In his honour a scholarship fund was set up to encourage and help young photographers.

== Early life ==
Parry was the youngest of four children, and was born and brought up in Prestatyn in north Wales. He attended Penmorfa County Primary and Prestatyn High Schools, and his interest in photography began while he was very young: by the age of 13 he had learned to develop and print his own film using a darkroom set up by his uncle. He took photographs of people staying at the nearby Pontin's holiday camp during the summer holidays while still at school. Parry left school at the age of 16 and was taken on by the local newspaper Rhyl Journal as a trainee photographer; the editor Brian Barratt later praised his "nose for a good news picture".

== Professional life ==
After studying at the National Council for the Training of Journalists at Sheffield College, at the age of 21 Parry joined the national newspaper Mail on Sunday. He later worked for both The Times and The Sunday Times. He worked with the chief reporter of Mail on Sunday, Barbara Jones, on a front-page story about the personal life of Sonia Sutcliffe (wife of murderer Peter Sutcliffe). During the 1989 Conservative leadership election, Parry followed the challenger Sir Anthony Meyer (his local MP) throughout his challenge, photographing him throughout each day; Meyer was impressed with Parry's ability to get access to events and regarded him as "a constant and welcome companion".

== Death ==
When an uprising against the government of Nicolae Ceaușescu broke out in Romania in December 1989, Parry was working for The Sunday Times and argued that he should be sent on assignment to cover events there. He spent several days in Bucharest taking pictures of the city recovering after Ceaușescu was overthrown, photographing soldiers with flowers in their arms, as well as funerals for people killed in the revolution. On 28 December he was returning to Britain and managed to find a place on an Antonov An-24 airliner operated by TAROM that was travelling out of Bucharest to Belgrade to pick up relief supplies. He took with him the undeveloped film from other photographers. The aircraft crashed near Găești, 43 miles west of Bucharest, killing all on board. An inquest in November 1990 returned an initial verdict of accidental death. Although to this day the investigation has not been officially closed, the most plausible explanation is that the plane was shot down by a surface-to-air missile.

A memorial service for Parry was held at St Bride's Church in Fleet Street on 30 January 1990. A photograph by Parry of the funeral of a young Romanian killed in the revolution won the Nikon Press Photograph of the Month for January 1990; the picture editor of the Press Association selected it as the winner because "it summed up better than anything the whole story of Romania and the terrible legacy of sadness inflicted on ordinary Romanians by the Ceaușescus".

== Scholarship ==
After Parry's death, the Picture Editor of The Sunday Times Aidan Sullivan worked with Parry's family and friends and set up the Ian Parry Scholarship Fund. The fund announced in September 1990 that it would offer photographers aged up to 24 funding of £1,000 plus a further £1,000 for equipment to cover a foreign assignment of their choice.
