= Laki Island =

Island in Jakarta, Indonesia

- Interactive map of Laki Island

Geography
- Location: Java Sea
- Coordinates: 5.9575°S 106.52139°E

Administration
- Indonesia
- Province: Jakarta

Demographics
- Population: Unpopulated

Additional information
- Time zone: UTC+07:00

Laki Island (Dutch: Menscheneter-Eiland, "Man-eater Island"; Indonesian: Pulau Laki, "Male Island") is an island located in the Thousand Islands administrative regency of Jakarta, Indonesia. The island gained international attention on January 9, 2021 when Sriwijaya Air Flight 182 crashed into the Java Sea near the island. The island is located north of Jakarta, Indonesia being part of the Thousand Islands.
