= List of incumbent regional heads and deputy regional heads in Central Java =

The following is an article about the list of Regional Heads and Deputy Regional Heads in 35 regencies/cities in Central Java who are currently still serving.

== List ==
Regency/ City	Photo of the Regent/ Mayor	Regent/ Mayor	Photo of Deputy Regent/ Mayor	Deputy Regent/ Mayor	Taking Office	End of Office (Planned)	Ref.
Banjarnegara; Regency List of Regents/Deputy Regents		Amalia Desiana		Wakhid Jumali	20 February 2025	20 February 2030	
Banyumas; Regency List of Regents/Deputy Regents		Sadewo Tri Lastiono		Dwi Asih Lintarti	20 February 2025	20 February 2030	
Batang; Regency List of Regents/Deputy Regents	pus	M. Faiz Kurniawan	pus	Suyono	20 February 2025	20 February 2030	
Blora; Regency List of Regents/Deputy Regents		Arief Rohman		Sri Setyorini	20 February 2025	20 February 2030	
Boyolali; Regency List of Regents/Deputy Regents	pus	Agus Irawan	pus	Dwi Fajar Nirwana	20 February 2025	20 February 2030	
Brebes; Regency List of Regents/Deputy Regents	pus	Paramitha Widya Kusuma	pus	Wurja	20 February 2025	20 February 2030	
Cilacap; Regency List of Regents/Deputy Regents	pus	Ammy Amalia Fatma Surya (Acting Officer)			15 March 2026	20 February 2030	
Demak; Regency List of Regents/Deputy Regents	pus	Eisti'anah	pus	Muhammad Badruddin	20 February 2025	20 February 2030	
Grobogan; Regency List of Regents/Deputy Regents		Setyo Hadi	pus	Sugeng Prasetyo	20 February 2025	20 February 2030	
Jepara; Regency List of Regents/Deputy Regents	pus	Witiarso Utomo	pus	Muhammad Ibnu Hajar	20 February 2025	20 February 2030	
Karanganyar; Regency List of Regents/Deputy Regents	pus	Rober Christanto	pus	Adhe Eliana	20 February 2025	20 February 2030	
Kebumen; Regency List of Regents/Deputy Regents	pus	Lilis Nuryani	pus	Zaeni Miftah	20 February 2025	20 February 2030	
Kendal; Regency List of Regents/Deputy Regents		Dyah Kartika Permanasari		Benny Karnadi	20 February 2025	20 February 2030	
Klaten; Regency List of Regents/Deputy Regents	pus	Hamenang Wajar Ismoyo			20 February 2025	20 February 2030	
Kudus; Regency List of Regents/Deputy Regents	pus	Sam'ani Intakoris	pus	Bellinda Putri Sabrina Birton	20 February 2025	20 February 2030	
Magelang; Regency List of Regents/Deputy Regents	pus	Grengseng Pamuji	pus	Sahid	20 February 2025	20 February 2030	
Pati; Regency List of Regents/Deputy Regents	pus	Risma Ardhi Chandra (Acting Officer)			21 January 2026	20 February 2030	
Pekalongan; Regency List of Regents/Deputy Regents	pus	Sukirman (Acting Officer)			9 March 2026	20 February 2030	
Pemalang; Regency List of Regents/Deputy Regents	pus	Anom Widiyantoro	pus	Nurkholes	20 February 2025	20 February 2030	
Purbalingga; Regency List of Regents/Deputy Regents	pus	Fahmi Muhammad Hanif	pus	Dimas Prasetyahani	20 February 2025	20 February 2030	
Purworejo; Regency List of Regents/Deputy Regents	pus	Yuli Hastuti	pus	Dion Agasi Setiabudi	20 February 2025	20 February 2030	
Rembang; Regency List of Regents/Deputy Regents	pus	Harno	pus	Mochamad Hanies Cholil Barro	20 February 2025	20 February 2030	
Semarang; Regency List of Regents/Deputy Regents	pus	Ngesti Nugraha	pus	Nur Arifah	20 February 2025	20 February 2030	
Sragen; Regency List of Regents/Deputy Regents	pus	Sigit Pamungkas		Suroto	20 February 2025	20 February 2030	
Sukoharjo; Regency List of Regents/Deputy Regents	pus	Etik Suryani	pus	Eko Sapto Purnomo	20 February 2025	20 February 2030	
Tegal; Regency List of Regents/Deputy Regents	pus	Ischak Maulana Rohman	pus	Ahmad Kholid	20 February 2025	20 February 2030	
Temanggung; Regency List of Regents/Deputy Regents	pus	Agus Setyawan	pus	Nadia Muna	20 February 2025	20 February 2030	
Wonogiri; Regency List of Regents/Deputy Regents	pus	Setyo Sukarno	pus	Imron Rizkyarno	20 February 2025	20 February 2030	
Wonosobo; Regency List of Regents/Deputy Regents	pus	Afif Nurhidayat	pus	Amir Husein	20 February 2025	20 February 2030	
Magelang; City List of Mayors/Deputy mayors	pus	Damar Prasetyono	pus	Sri Harso	20 February 2025	20 February 2030	
Pekalongan; City List of Mayors/Deputy mayors	pus	Achmad Afzan Arslan Djunaid	pus	Balqis Diab	20 February 2025	20 February 2030	
Salatiga; City List of Mayors/Deputy mayors	pus	Robby Hernawan	pus	Nina Agustin	20 February 2025	20 February 2030	
Semarang; City List of Mayors/Deputy mayors	pus	Agustina Wilujeng Pramestuti	pus	Iswar Aminuddin	20 February 2025	20 February 2030	
Surakarta; City List of Mayors/Deputy mayors	pus	Respati Ardi	pus	Astrid Widayani	20 February 2025	20 February 2030	
Tegal; City List of Mayors/Deputy mayors	pus	Dedy Yon Supriyono	pus	Tazkiyatul Muthmainnah	20 February 2025	20 February 2030	

== See also ==
- Central Java
