= Loning =

Loning or Löning may refer to:

- Adolf Loning (fl. 1830s), German lieutenant and writer
- Frank Löning (b. 1981), German footballer
- Markus Löning, German politician and member of the 15th Bundestag
- Loning, Indonesia, a village in Central Java

== See also ==
- Loaning
- Loningisa
- Löningen
