= Karangasem =

Karangasem, also spelled Karang Asem, is a Balinese name and may refer to:

== Locations ==
- Kingdom of Karangasem, a former Bali kingdom where a royal palace was located, and the royal family itself
- Karangasem Regency of Bali province in Indonesia
- Karangasem District of Karangasem Regency, the seat of the former royal palace and eponymous main settlement, Karangasem

=== Subdistrict/Village ===
- Karangasem, Bulu, Rembang
- Karangasem, Bulu, Sukoharjo
- Karangasem, Cawas, Klaten
- Karangasem, Cibeber, Cilegon
- Karangasem, Jenu, Tuban
- Karangasem, Karangasem, Karangasem
- Karangasem, Karangwareng, Cirebon
- Karangasem, Kertanegara, Purbalingga
- Karangasem, Klampis, Bangkalan
- Karangasem, Kutorejo, Mojokerto
- Karangasem, Lawiyan, Surakarta
- Karangasem, Leuwimunding, Majalengka
- Karangasem, Lumbang, Pasuruan
- Karangasem, Paliyan, Gunung Kidul
- Karangasem, Petarukan, Pemalang
- Karangasem, Plumbon, Cirebon
- Karangasem, Ponjong, Gunung Kidul
- Karangasem, Sampang, Cilacap
- Karangasem, Sayung, Demak
- Karangasem, Sedan, Rembang
- Karangasem, Talun, Pekalongan
- Karangasem, Tanon, Sragen
- Karangasem, Terisi, Indramayu
- Karang Asem, Tungkal Ilir, Banyuasin
- Karangasem, Wirosari, Grobogan
- Karangasem, Wonorejo, Pasuruan
- Karang Asem Barat, Citeureup, Bogor
- Karangasem Selatan, Batang, Batang
- Karang Asem Timur, Citeureup, Bogor
- Karangasem Utara, Batang, Batang

=== Railway Station ===
- Karangasem Station of Java's Eastern Line Railway (Indonesia), in Glagah District of Banyuwangi Regency.
