= Tlagasana =

- Location in Central Java and Indonesia Tlagasana (Indonesia)
- Coordinates: 7°10′43.09″S 109°30′20.38″E
- Country: Indonesia
- Province: Central Java
- Regency: Pemalang Regency
- District: Watukumpul District
- Elevation: 1,591 ft (485 m)

Population (2010)
  - Total: 8,786
- Time zone: UTC+7 (Indonesia Western Standard Time)

Tlagasana is a large village in Watukumpul district, Pemalang Regency in Central Java province, Indonesia. Its population is 8786.

== Climate ==
Tlagasana has a very wet tropical rainforest climate (Af) with heavy rainfall from May to September and very heavy to extremely heavy rainfall from October to April.

Climate data for Tlagasana
Month	Jan	Feb	Mar	Apr	May	Jun	Jul	Aug	Sep	Oct	Nov	Dec	Year
Mean daily maximum °C (°F)	27.7 (81.9)	27.9 (82.2)	28.5 (83.3)	28.7 (83.7)	28.9 (84.0)	28.9 (84.0)	28.7 (83.7)	29.0 (84.2)	29.4 (84.9)	29.6 (85.3)	28.8 (83.8)	28.0 (82.4)	28.7 (83.6)
Daily mean °C (°F)	23.6 (74.5)	23.7 (74.7)	24.2 (75.6)	24.4 (75.9)	24.6 (76.3)	24.1 (75.4)	23.7 (74.7)	23.8 (74.8)	24.2 (75.6)	24.7 (76.5)	24.4 (75.9)	23.7 (74.7)	24.1 (75.4)
Mean daily minimum °C (°F)	19.6 (67.3)	19.6 (67.3)	20.0 (68.0)	20.2 (68.4)	20.3 (68.5)	19.4 (66.9)	18.7 (65.7)	18.6 (65.5)	19.1 (66.4)	19.8 (67.6)	20.0 (68.0)	19.5 (67.1)	19.6 (67.2)
Average rainfall mm (inches)	827 (32.6)	736 (29.0)	670 (26.4)	473 (18.6)	316 (12.4)	182 (7.2)	139 (5.5)	130 (5.1)	139 (5.5)	339 (13.3)	473 (18.6)	684 (26.9)	5,108 (201.1)
Source: Climate-Data.org
