= Mayor of Semarang =

- Wali Kota Semarang
- Coat of arms of Semarang

- Incumbent; Agustina Wilujeng Pramestuti since 20 February 2025
- Term length: 5 years
- Inaugural holder: Mr. Mohammad Ichsan
- Formation: 1945
- Website: semarangkota.go.id

Mayor of Semarang is the head of the second-level region who holds the government in Semarang together with the Vice Mayor and 50 members of the Semarang City Regional House of Representatives. The mayor and vice mayor of Semarang are elected through general elections held every 5 years. The first mayor of Semarang was Mohammad Ichsan, who governed the city period from 1945 to 1949.

== List ==
The following is a list of the names of the Mayors of Semarang from time to time.

Num.	Portrait	Mayor	Beginning of office	End of Term	Political Party / Faction	Period	Note.	Vice mayor
1		Mohammad Ichsan	1945	1949	Non-Party	1		
2		Mr. Koesoebiyono Hadinoto Tjondrowibowo	1949	1951	Non-Party	2		
3		Hadisoebeno Sosrowerdojo	1951	1958	Indonesian National Party	3		
4		Abdulmadjid Djojoadiningrat	1958	1960	Communist Party of Indonesia	4		
5		R. M. Soebagyono Tjondrokoesoemo	1961	1964	Non-Party	5		
6		Mr. Wuryanto	1964	1966	Non-Party	6		
7		Letkol. Soeparno Hendrowerdojo	1966	1967	ABRI–AD	7		
8		Letkol. R. Warsito Soegiarto	1967	1973	ABRI–AD	8		
9		Kolonel Hadijanto	1973	1980	ABRI–AD	9		
10		Kol. H. Iman Soeparto Tjakrajoeda	1980	1990	ABRI–AD	10 (1980)		
10		Kol. H. Iman Soeparto Tjakrajoeda	1980	1990	ABRI–AD	11 (1985)		
11		Kol. H. Soetrisno Suharto	1990	2000	ABRI–AD	12 (1990)		
11		Kol. H. Soetrisno Suharto	1990	2000	ABRI–AD	13 (1995)		Drs. R. Herdjono
12		Sukawi Sutarip	2000	2005	Independent	14 (2000)		Drs. H. Muchafif Adi Subrata
12		Sukawi Sutarip	2005	2010	Democratic Party	15 (2005)		Mahfudz Ali
13		Soemarmo Hadi Saputro	19 July 2010	21 May 2013	Indonesian Democratic Party of Struggle	16 (2010)		Hendrar Prihadi
14		Hendrar Prihadi	21 May 2013	19 July 2015	Indonesian Democratic Party of Struggle	16 (2010)		
14		Hendrar Prihadi	17 February 2016	17 February 2021	Indonesian Democratic Party of Struggle	17 (2015)		Hevearita Gunaryanti Rahayu
14		Hendrar Prihadi	26 February 2021	10 October 2022	Indonesian Democratic Party of Struggle	18 (2020)		Hevearita Gunaryanti Rahayu
15		Hevearita Gunaryanti Rahayu	30 January 2023	19 February 2025	Indonesian Democratic Party of Struggle	18 (2020)		
16		Agustina Wilujeng Pramestuti	20 February 2025	Incumbent	Indonesian Democratic Party of Struggle	19 (2024)		Iswar Aminuddin

== List of Acting Mayors ==
Portrait	Name	Taking office	Definitive mayor
	Tavip Supriyanto (Acting)	19 July 2015 – 17 February 2016	Transition
	Tavip Supriyanto (Acting)	25 September 2020 – 5 December 2020	Hendrar Prihadi
	Iswar Aminuddin (Daily Executive)	17–26 February 2021	Transition
	Hevearita Gunaryanti Rahayu (Acting Officer)	10 October 2022 – 30 January 2023	Transition

== See also ==
- Semarang
- List of incumbent regional heads and deputy regional heads in Central Java
