= 2024 Tegal regency election =

- 27 November 2024
- Turnout: 66.4%
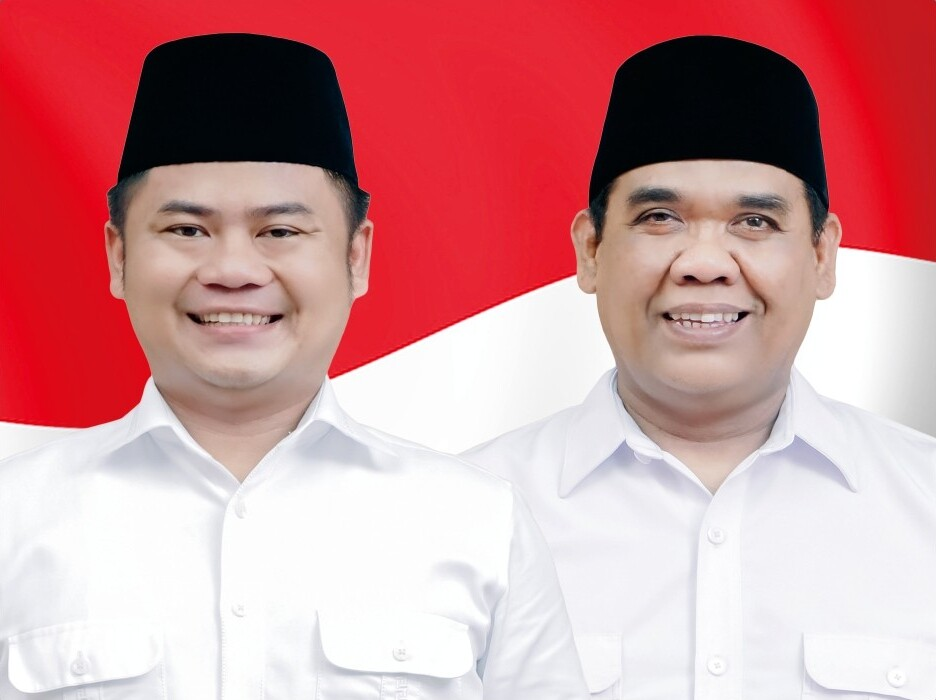

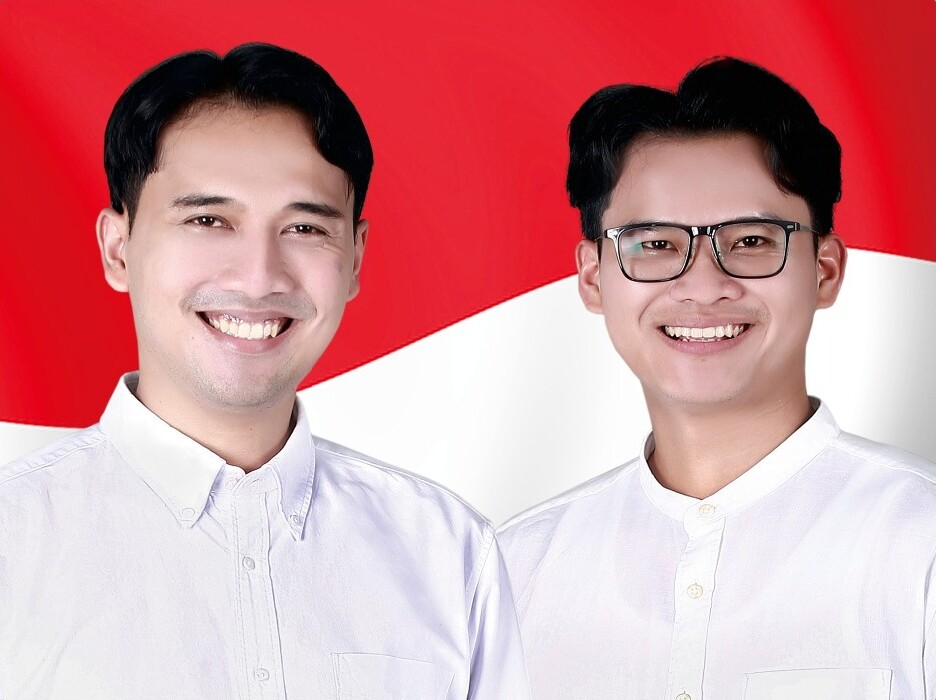
Candidate	Ischak Maulana Rohman	Bima Eka Sakti
Party	PKB	PDI-P
Running mate	Ahmad Kholid	Muhammad Syaeful Mujab
Popular vote	542,236	256,621
Percentage	67.88%	32.12%
Regent before election
Agustyarsyah
Independent
Elected Regent
Ischak Maulana Rohman
PKB

The 2024 Tegal regency election was held on 27 November 2024 as part of nationwide local elections to elect the regent of Tegal Regency, Central Java for a five-year term. The previously elected regent Umi Azizah did not contest the election, with her party the National Awakening Party instead endorsing Ischak Maulana Rohman who defeated PDI-P candidate Bima Eka Sakti to win the election.

== Electoral system ==
The election, like other local elections in 2024, follow the first-past-the-post system where the candidate with the most votes wins the election, even if they do not win a majority. It is possible for a candidate to run uncontested, in which case the candidate is still required to win a majority of votes "against" an "empty box" option. Should the candidate fail to do so, the election will be repeated on a later date.

== Candidates ==
According to electoral regulations, candidates were required to secure the support of a political party or a coalition of parties which collectively won at least 6.5 percent of votes in the 2024 legislative election for the municipal legislature, i.e. at least 56,608 votes total. Candidates may alternatively register without party endorsement by submitting photocopies of identity cards. One candidate registered to run in Tegal's election, but failed to pass factual verification of the submitted identity cards and thus was ineligible to run.

Tegal's 2018–2023 regent elected in the 2018 regency election, Umi Azizah, declared her intention to run in the election and registered to run at her party the National Awakening Party (PKB), but ultimately PKB did not give her the party's endorsement and she did not take part in the election. Instead, PKB endorsed the candidacy of Ischak Maulana Rohman, a local party official and GP Ansor leader. Rohman's running mate Ahmad Kholid is a Gerindra politician, and the ticket was supported by a coalition of 12 political parties including 6 represented in Tegal Regency's DPRD totalling 40 seats.

Rohman's electoral opponent, Bima Eka Sakti, worked as a bureaucrat in Tegal's municipal government from 2010 to 2024, and was backed by the Indonesian Democratic Party of Struggle. He had also previously registered as an independent vice-regent candidate but failed to pass the verification. His running mate is former student activist and software consultant Muhammad Syaeful Mujab.

== Campaign ==
Two rounds of public debates between the candidates were organized by the General Elections Commission. The candidates campaigned until 23 November 2024.

== Results ==
Candidate	Running mate	Candidate party	Votes	%
Ischak Maulana Rohman	Ahmad Kholid	PKB	542,236	67.88
Bima Eka Sakti	Muhammad Syaeful Mujab	PDI-P	256,621	32.12
Total			798,857	100.00
Valid votes			798,857	96.71
Invalid/blank votes			27,138	3.29
Total votes			825,995	100.00
Registered voters/turnout			1,244,301	66.38
Source: Tegal Regency KPU
