= Nyamplung Sari =

Village in Central Java, Indonesia

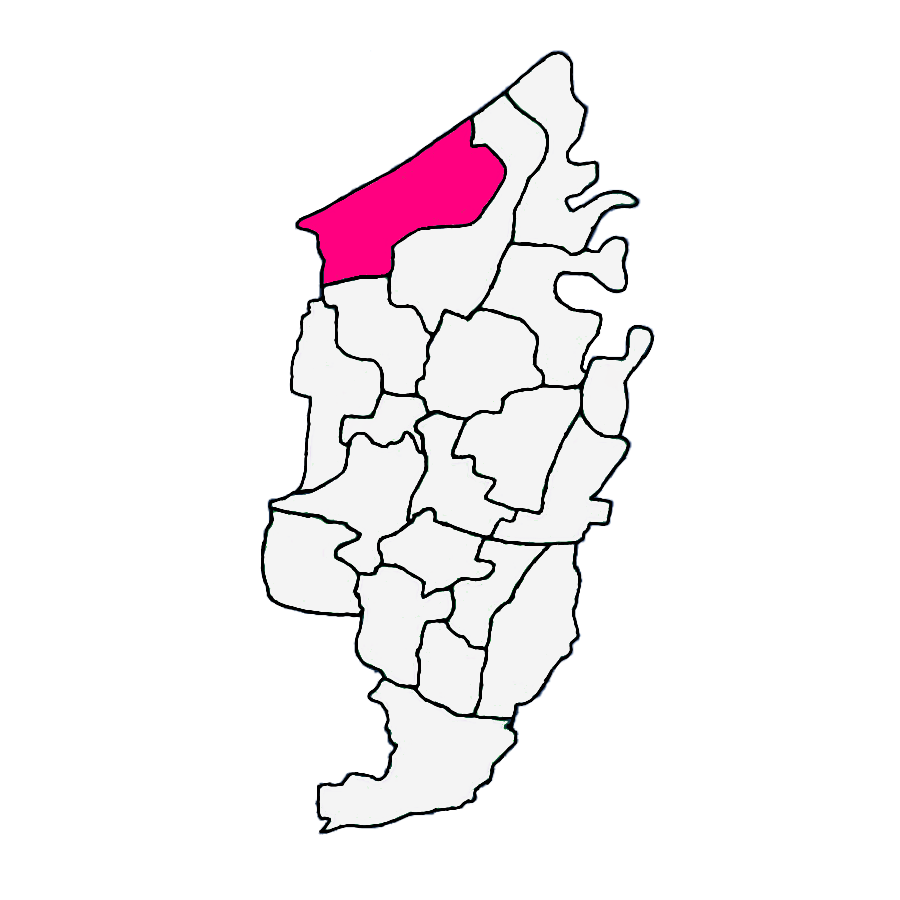
Location of Nyamplung Sari village in Petarukan, Pemalang

Nyamplung Sari (Indonesian pronunciation: [ˌɲamplʊŋ ˈsari]) is a village in the town of Petarukan, Pemalang Regency, Central Java Province, Indonesia. This villages has an area of 8,83 km^{2} and a population of 7,650 inhabitants in 2022.
