= Petanjungan =

Village in Central Java, Indonesia

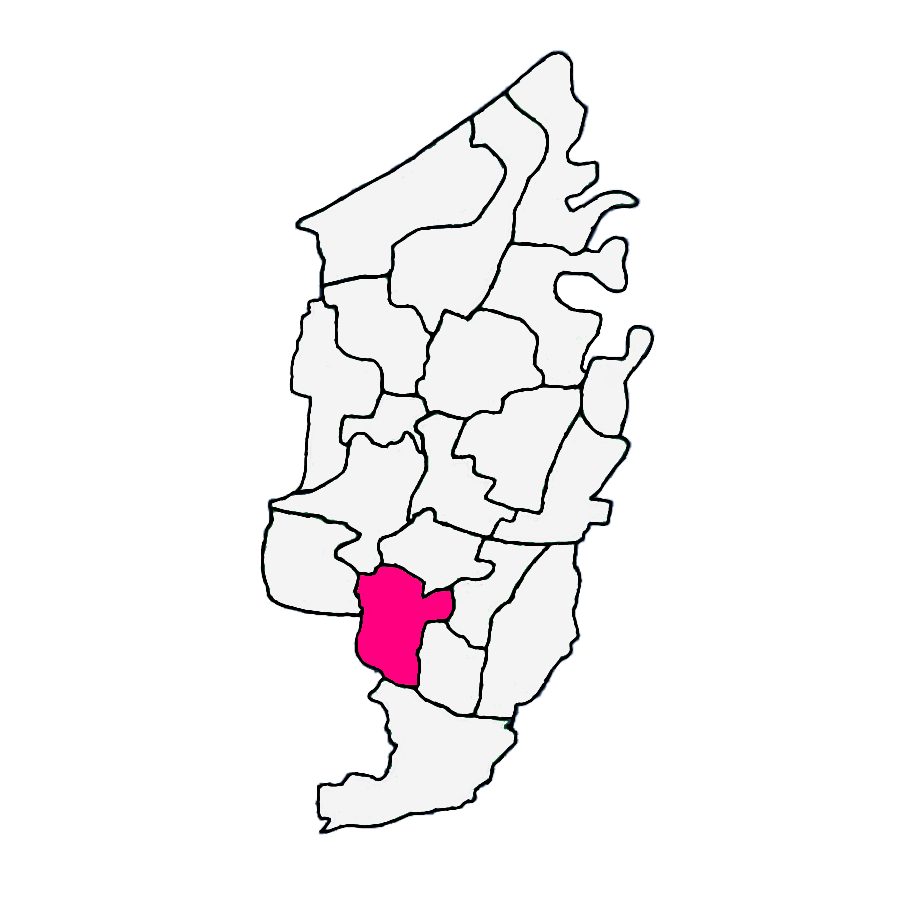
Location of Petanjungan village in Petarukan, Pemalang

Petanjungan (Indonesian pronunciation: [pətaɲˈd͡ʒuŋan]) is a village in the town of Petarukan, Pemalang Regency, Central Java Province, Indonesia. This villages has an area of 4,08 km^{2} and a population of 6,143 inhabitants in 2022.
