= Serang, Central Java =

Village in Central Java, Indonesia

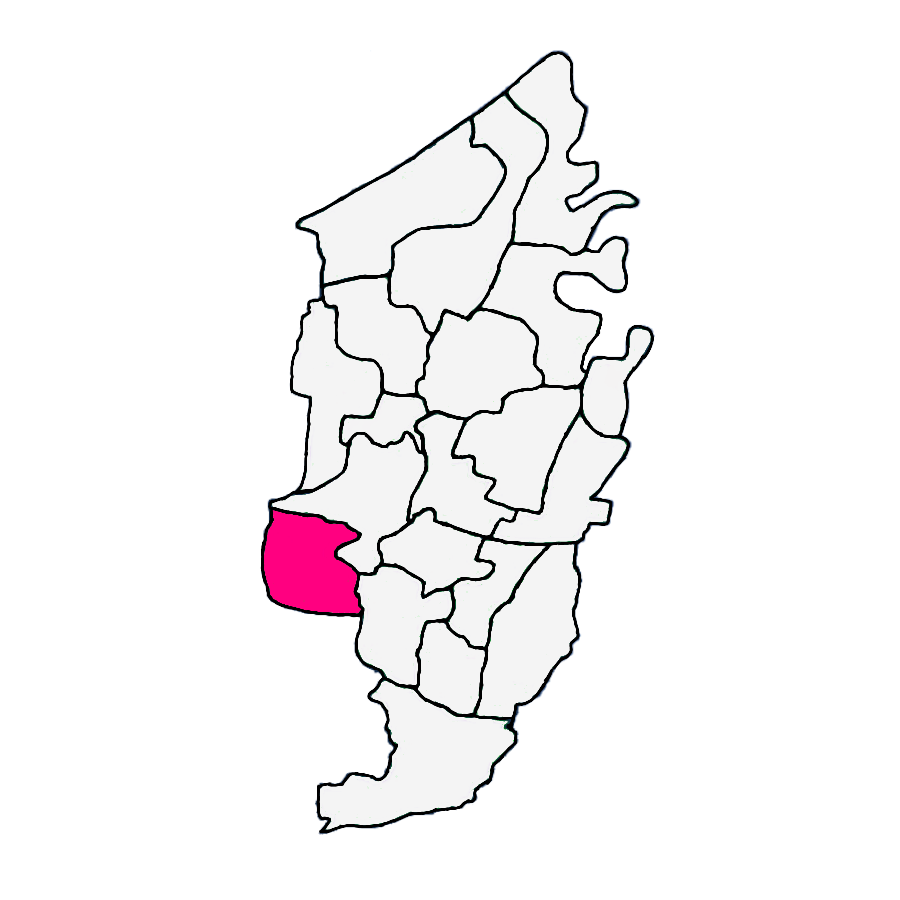
Location of Serang village in Petarukan, Pemalang

Serang (Indonesian pronunciation: [səˈraŋ]) is a village in the town of Petarukan, Pemalang Regency, Central Java Province, Indonesia. This village had an area of 3.69 km^{2} and a population of 8,434 inhabitants in 2022.
