= Petarukan, Pemalang =

Petarukan
- District
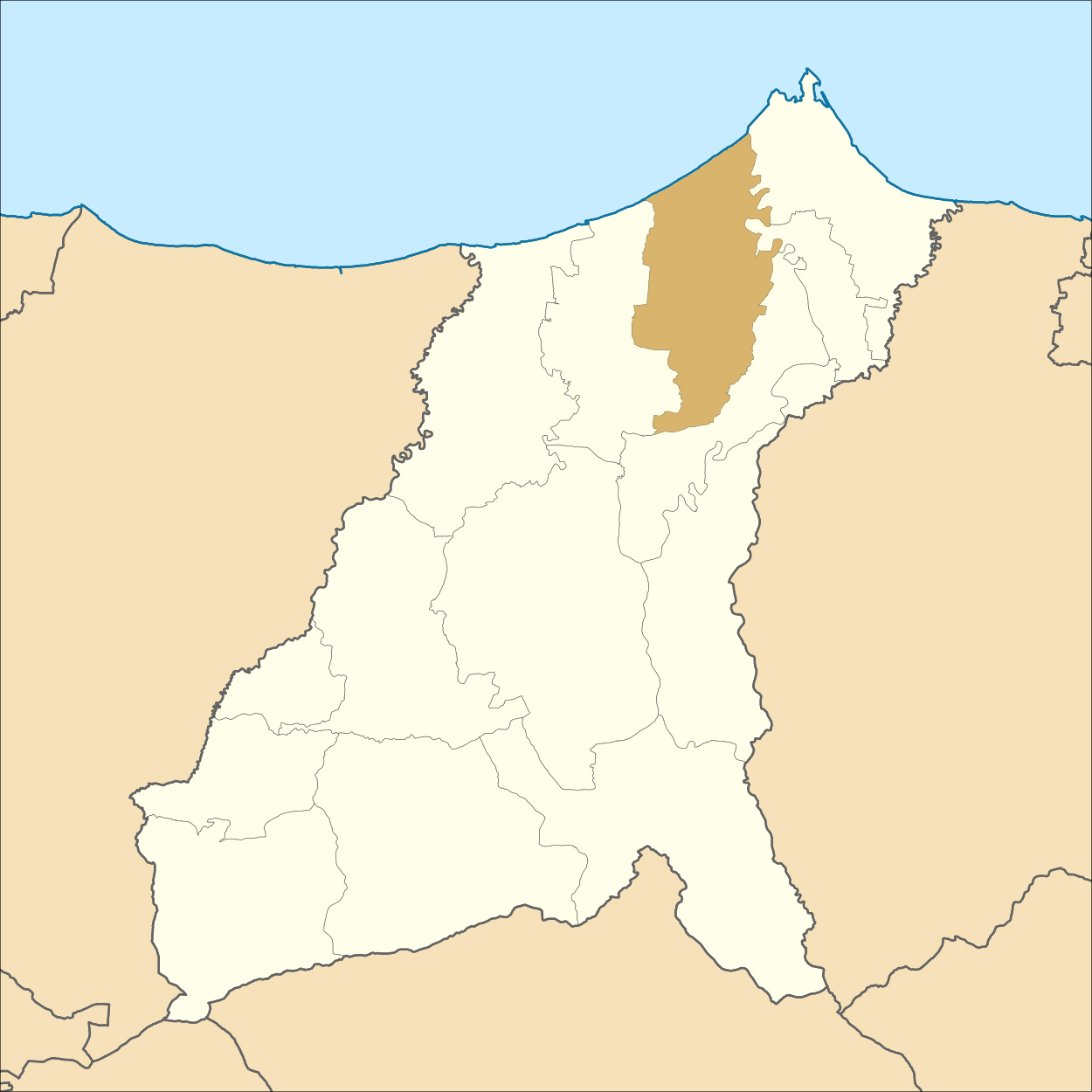

- Location within Java Location within Indonesia
- Coordinates: 6°53′46″S 109°27′05″E
- Country: Indonesia
- Province: Central Java
- City/ Regency: Pemalang

Government
  - Camat: Drs. Fera Djoko Susanto, M.AP

Area
  - Total: 81.29 km^{2} (31.39 sq mi)

Population
  - Total: 178,127
  - Density: 2,191/km^{2} (5,675/sq mi)
- Time zone: UTC+7 (Indonesia Western Time)

Petarukan (Indonesian pronunciation: [pət̪aˈrukan]) is an administrative district (kecamatan) in Pemalang Regency, Central Java Province, Indonesia. It lies immediately to the east of the highly urbanised Pemalang-Taman area. Petarukan District contains the urban village (kelurahan) of Petarukan and 19 rural villages (desa).

== Geography ==
Petarukan is located on the northern coast of the Java Sea with an altitude of 0 – 7 m.

The boundaries of the District of Petarukan, Pemalang are as follows :

North	Java Sea
South	Ampelgading
West	Taman
East	Ampelgading, Ulujami

== Climate ==
Climate data for Petarukan, Indonesia
Month	Jan	Feb	Mar	Apr	May	Jun	Jul	Aug	Sep	Oct	Nov	Dec	Year
Mean daily maximum °C (°F)	28.3 (82.9)	28.1 (82.6)	28.7 (83.7)	29.1 (84.4)	29.3 (84.7)	29.2 (84.6)	29.4 (84.9)	30.1 (86.2)	31 (88)	30.8 (87.4)	29.4 (84.9)	28.8 (83.8)	29.4 (84.8)
Daily mean °C (°F)	25.6 (78.1)	25.5 (77.9)	26 (79)	26.4 (79.5)	26.5 (79.7)	26.2 (79.2)	26 (79)	26.3 (79.3)	27.1 (80.8)	27.2 (81.0)	26.5 (79.7)	26 (79)	26.3 (79.4)
Mean daily minimum °C (°F)	23.8 (74.8)	23.7 (74.7)	23.9 (75.0)	24.1 (75.4)	24.1 (75.4)	23.6 (74.5)	23.2 (73.8)	23.1 (73.6)	23.9 (75.0)	24.4 (75.9)	24.3 (75.7)	24.1 (75.4)	23.8 (74.9)
Average precipitation mm (inches)	433 (17.0)	404 (15.9)	400 (15.7)	329 (13.0)	188 (7.4)	128 (5.0)	92 (3.6)	65 (2.6)	100 (3.9)	236 (9.3)	393 (15.5)	470 (18.5)	3,238 (127.4)
Average rainy days	21	20	22	20	16	12	10	8	10	16	20	21	196
Average relative humidity (%)	88	89	88	87	85	83	79	74	71	76	84	87	83
Source: Climate Data

== Villages ==
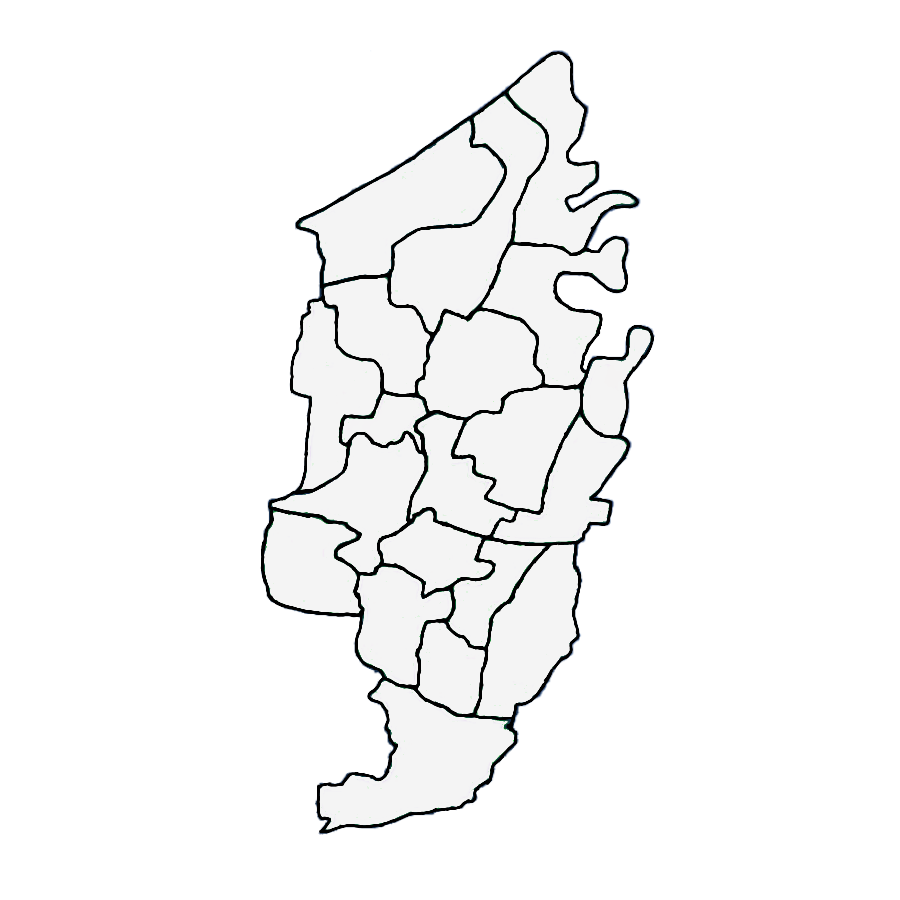
Map villages in Petarukan District

1. Bulu
2. Iser
3. Kalirandu
4. Karangasem
5. Kendaldoyong
6. Kendalrejo
7. Kendalsari
8. Klareyan
9. Loning
10. Nyamplung Sari
11. Panjunan
12. Pegundan
13. Pesucen
14. Petanjungan
15. Petarukan
16. Serang
17. Sirangkang
18. Tegalmlati
19. Temuireng
20. Widodaren
