= Hevearita Gunaryanti Rahayu =

Indonesian politician (born 1966)

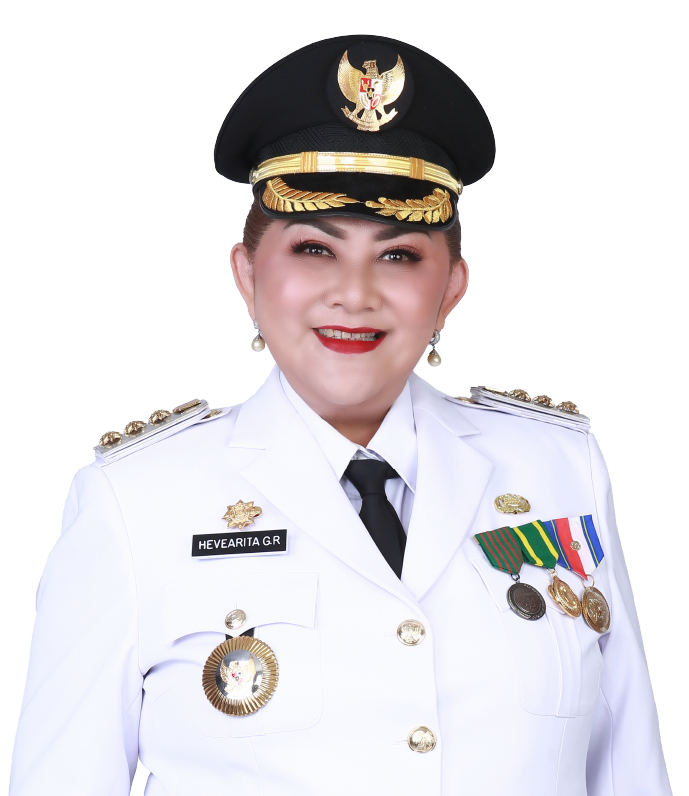

15th Mayor of Semarang
- In office 30 January 2023 – 19 February 2025; Acting: 10 October 2022 – 30 January 2023
- Preceded by: Hendrar Prihadi
- Succeeded by: Agustina Wilujeng Pramestuti

Vice Mayor of Semarang
- In office 17 February 2016 – 10 October 2022
- Mayor: Hendrar Prihadi
- Preceded by: Hendrar Prihadi
- Succeeded by: Iswar Aminuddin

Personal details
- Born: 4 May 1966 (age 60) Semarang, Central Java, Indonesia
- Party: PDI-P

Hevearita Gunaryanti Rahayu (born 4 May 1966) is an Indonesian politician who has served as the mayor of Semarang, Central Java since January 2023. She was previously Semarang's vice mayor under Hendrar Prihadi since 2016 until Hendrar's resignation in October 2022.

== Early and personal life ==
Hevearita Gunaryanti Rahayu was born in Semarang on 4 May 1966 to Soenarjo Rahardjo and Atiek Nur Soetarti, as one of five siblings. She studied at schools in Semarang, graduating from State High School No. 1 Semarang in 1984. She is married to Alwin Basri, a member of the Central Java Regional House of Representatives. Their only son was born in 1995. She received a bachelor's degree in agriculture at the National Veteran Development University of Yogyakarta in 1989, and later received a master's degree from Diponegoro University in 2019.

== Career ==
In 1991, Hevearita began to work at Bank Universal, remaining there until 2003 after the bank merged into Permata Bank. She then became the director at an outsourcing company before becoming president director of an oil and gas company owned by the Central Java provincial government which operated in Cepu. She worked there until 2015.

Hevearita ran as the running mate to incumbent Hendrar Prihadi in the 2015 mayoral election for Semarang, and the pair was elected with 320,237 votes (46.4%). They were sworn in on 17 February 2016. Hendrar and Hevearita ran uncontested for a second term in the 2020 mayoral election, and won 91.4% of votes against a blank ballot, being sworn in for their second term on 27 February 2021.

On 10 October 2022, Hendrar was appointed by president Joko Widodo as head of the national Procurement Policy Institute, and thus resigned from his post as mayor with Hevearita taking his place initially as acting mayor. She was sworn in as a full mayor on 30 January 2023, becoming the first female mayor of Semarang. As mayor, she allocated funds to purchase 177 motorcycles for administrative village heads across the city, replacing the last purchase in 2014. A brief social media controversy emerged due to misreporting of the purchase cost, nearly doubling the reported cost from Rp 4.7 billion (US$300,000) to Rp 8 billion (US$510,000). She attempted to run for a second term in the 2024 mayoral election, but did not run.

On 19 February 2025, the day before the end of her tenure, Hevearita along with her husband Alwin Basri was arrested by the Corruption Eradication Commission on charges of receiving bribes and cutting civil servant pay for personal benefit.
