= Klareyan =

Village in Central Java, Indonesia

Coordinates: 6°50′28″S 109°28′44″E

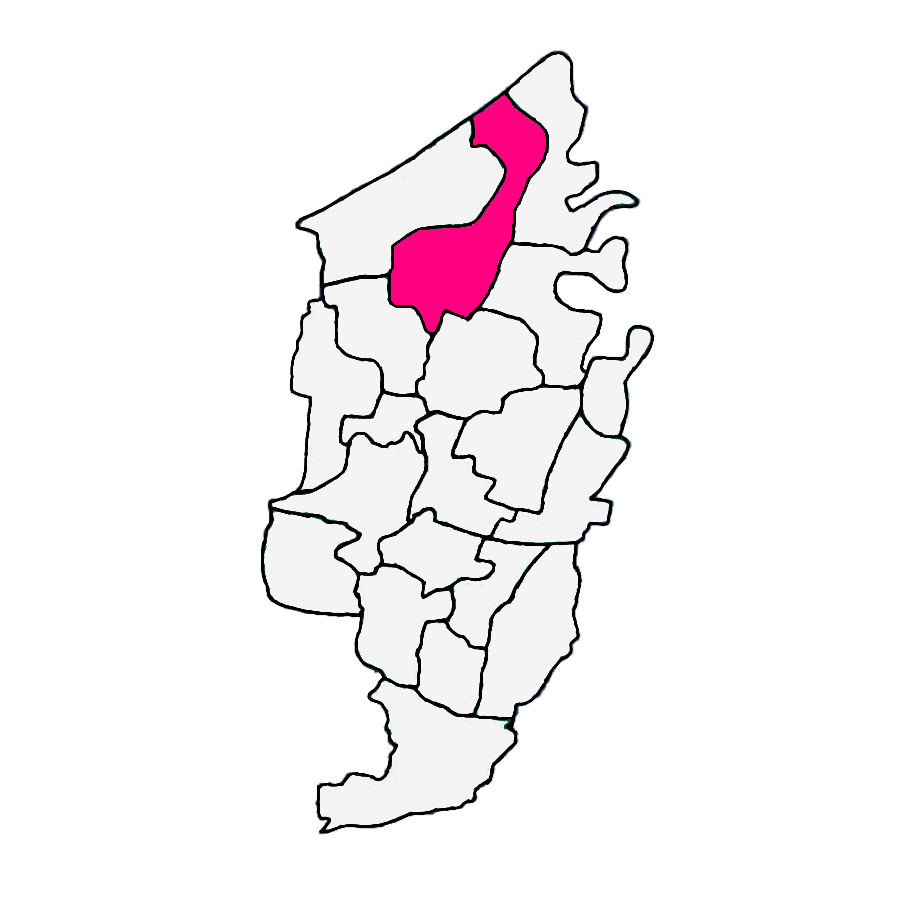
Location of Klareyan village in Petarukan, Pemalang

Klareyan is a village in the town of Petarukan, Pemalang Regency, Central Java Province, Indonesia. This villages has an area of 6,27 km^{2} and a population of 13,148 inhabitants in 2022.
