= Kendalrejo =

Village in Pemalang Regency, Central Java, Indonesia

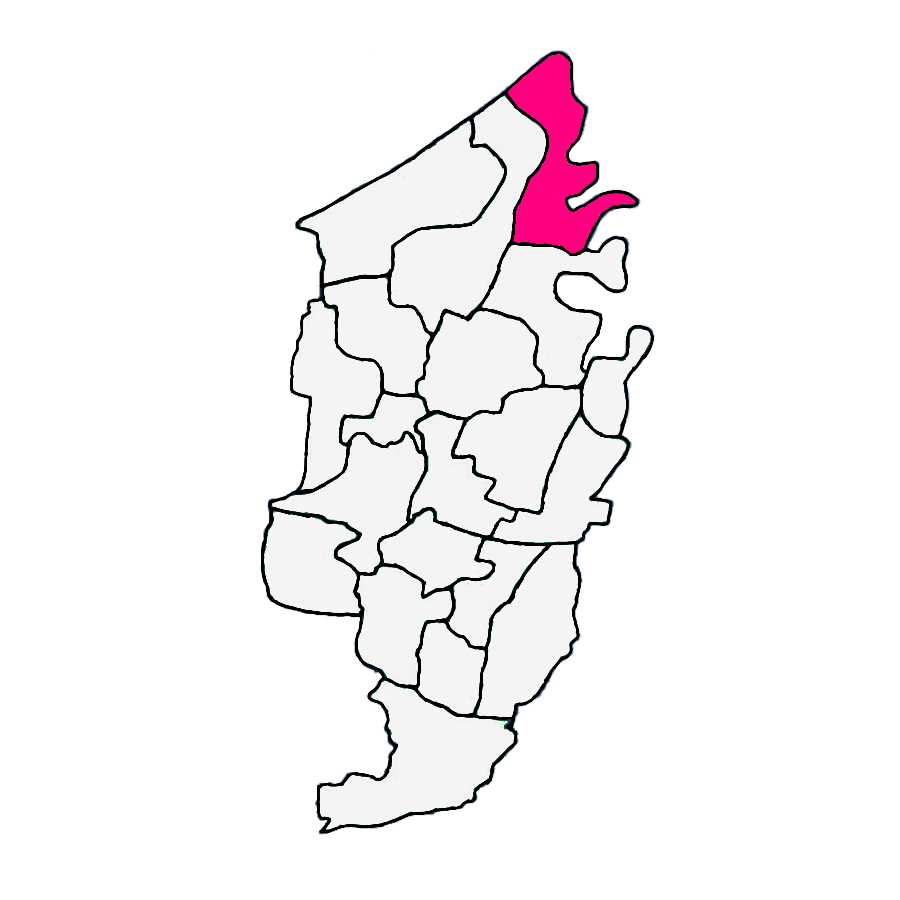

Kendalrejo (Indonesian pronunciation: [kəndalrəˈd͡ʒɔ]) is a village in the town of Petarukan, Pemalang Regency, Central Java, Indonesia. It had an area of 4.14 km² and a population of 8,793 inhabitants in 2022.
