= Pesucen =

Village in Central Java, Indonesia

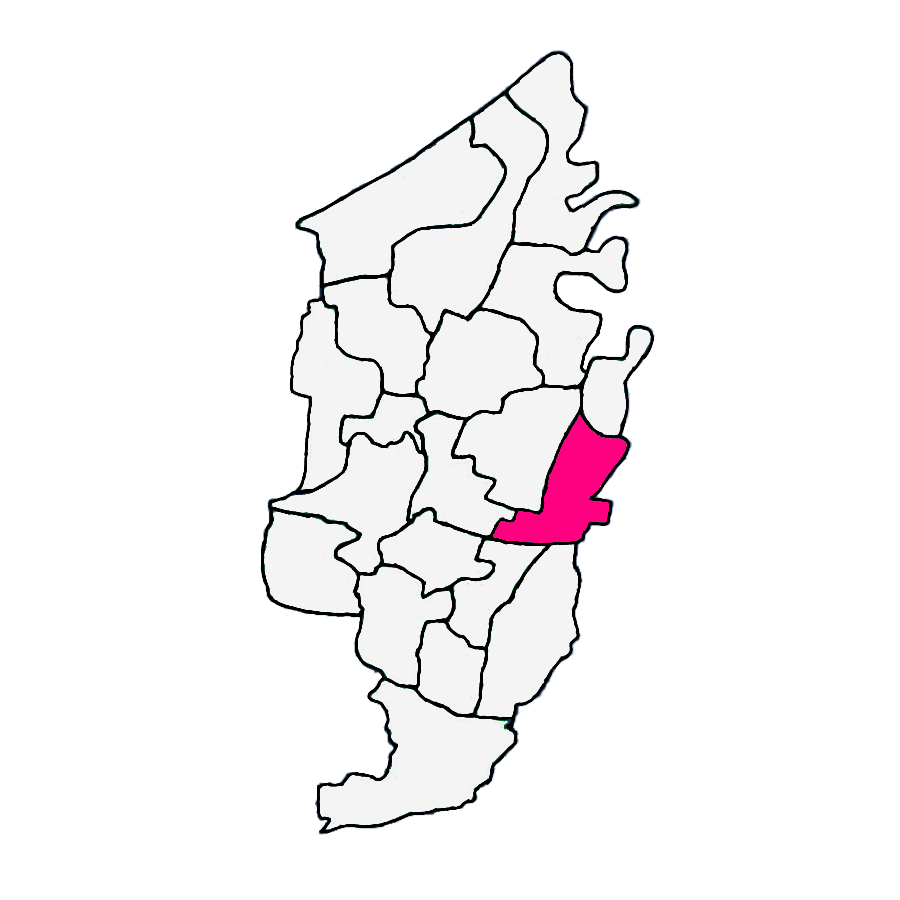
Location of Pesucen village in Petarukan, Pemalang

Pesucen (Indonesian pronunciation: [pəˈsut͡ʃɛn]) is a village in the town of Petarukan, Pemalang Regency, Central Java Province, Indonesia. This village has an area of 3,73 km^{2} and a population of 9,003 inhabitants in 2022.
