= Karangsari =

- Location in Central Java and Indonesia Karangsari (Indonesia)
- Coordinates: 7°11′53.4732″S 109°12′43.6104″E
- Country: Indonesia
- Province: Central Java
- Regency: Pemalang Regency
- District: Pulosari District
- Elevation: 4,820 ft (1,469 m)

Population (2010)
  - Total: 5,015
- Time zone: UTC+7 (Western Indonesia Time)

Karangsari (Indonesian pronunciation: [karaŋˈsari]) is a village in Pulosari District, Pemalang Regency in Central Java Province. Its population is 5015.

== Climate ==
Karangsari has a subtropical highland climate (Cfb). It has moderate rainfall from June to September and heavy to very heavy rainfall from October to May.

Climate data for Karangsari
Month	Jan	Feb	Mar	Apr	May	Jun	Jul	Aug	Sep	Oct	Nov	Dec	Year
Mean daily maximum °C (°F)	22.1 (71.8)	22.3 (72.1)	22.6 (72.7)	22.6 (72.7)	22.8 (73.0)	22.8 (73.0)	22.3 (72.1)	22.5 (72.5)	23.0 (73.4)	23.2 (73.8)	23.0 (73.4)	22.5 (72.5)	22.6 (72.7)
Daily mean °C (°F)	17.9 (64.2)	18.0 (64.4)	18.3 (64.9)	18.3 (64.9)	18.4 (65.1)	18.0 (64.4)	17.3 (63.1)	17.2 (63.0)	17.9 (64.2)	18.4 (65.1)	18.5 (65.3)	18.1 (64.6)	18.0 (64.4)
Mean daily minimum °C (°F)	13.7 (56.7)	13.7 (56.7)	14.0 (57.2)	14.1 (57.4)	14.1 (57.4)	13.3 (55.9)	12.4 (54.3)	12.0 (53.6)	12.8 (55.0)	13.6 (56.5)	14.0 (57.2)	13.7 (56.7)	13.4 (56.2)
Average precipitation mm (inches)	598 (23.5)	541 (21.3)	543 (21.4)	336 (13.2)	252 (9.9)	122 (4.8)	95 (3.7)	89 (3.5)	97 (3.8)	195 (7.7)	316 (12.4)	476 (18.7)	3,660 (143.9)
Source: Climate-Data.org
