= Regent of Batang =

- Bupati Batang
- Coat of arms of Batang Regency

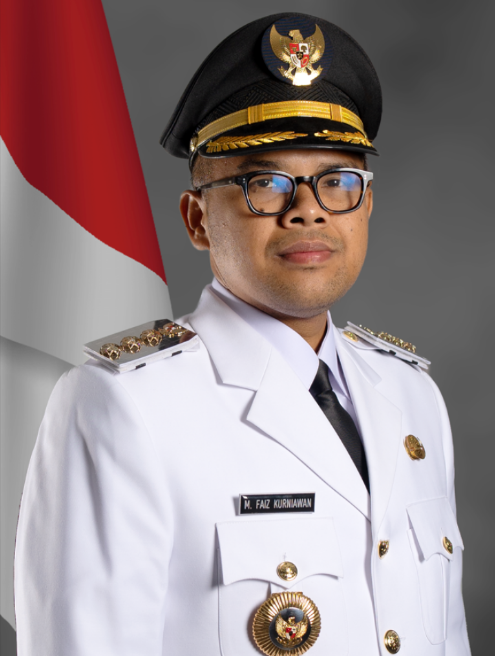
- Incumbent; M. Faiz Kurniawan since 20 February 2025
- Term length: 5 years
- Inaugural holder: R. Sadi Poerwopranoto
- Formation: 8 April 1966
- Website: batangkab.go.id

Regent of Batang is the head of the second-level region who holds the government in Batang Regency together with the Vice Regent and 45 members of the Batang Regency Regional House of Representatives. The regent and vice regent of Batang are elected through general elections held every 5 years. The first regent of Batang was R. Sadi Poerwopranoto, who governed the city period from 1966 to 1967.

== List ==
The following is a list of the names of the regents of Batang from time to time.

Regent of Batang
Num.	Portrait	Mayor	Beginning of office	End of Term	Political Party / Faction	Period	Note.	Vice mayor
1		R. Sadi Poerwopranoto (?-)	8 April 1966	31 May 1967	Independent	1		N/A
2		R. Harjono Prodjodirdjo (?-)	31 May 1967	10 October 1972	Independent	2		N/A
3		Soejitno (?-)	10 November 1972	21 March 1979	Independent	3		N/A
4		Soekirdjo (?-)	21 March 1979	1 January 1988	Independent	4		N/A
5		Soehoed (?-)	26 July 1988	26 July 1993	Independent	5		N/A
6		Muslich Effendi (?-)	26 July 1993	26 July 1998	Independent	6		N/A
7		Djoko Poernomo (?-)	22 October 1998	7 August 2001	Independent	7		N/A
8		Bambang Bintoro	11 February 2002	11 February 2007	Independent	8		Achfa Machfudz
8		Bambang Bintoro	11 February 2007	11 February 2012	Independent	9 (2006)		Achfa Machfudz
9		Yoyok Riyo Sudibyo (born 1972)	12 February 2012	13 February 2017	Independent	10 (2011)		Soetadi
10		Wihaji (born 1976)	22 May 2017	22 May 2022	Golkar	11 (2017)		Suyono
11		Faiz Kurniawan (born 1991)	20 February 2025	Incumbent	Golkar	12 (2024)		Suyono

== Temporary replacement ==
In the government stack, a regional head who submits himself to leave or temporarily resigns from his position to the central government, then the minister of home affairs prepares a replacement who is a bureaucrat in the regional government or even a vice regent, including when the regent's position is in a transition period.

Portrait	Mayor	Party	Beginning	End	Duration	Period	Definitive	Ref.
	Nasikhin (Acting Officer)	Independent	13 February 2017	19 April 2017	65 days	Transition (2017)		
	Siswo Laksono (Acting)	Independent	20 April 2017	21 May 2017	31 days	Transition (2017)		
	Lani Dwi Rejeki (born 1965) (Acting)	Independent	22 May 2022	19 May 2024	1 year, 363 days	Transition (2022–2025)		
	Lani Dwi Rejeki (born 1965) (Acting)	Independent	19 May 2024	19 February 2025	276 days	Transition (2022–2025)		(Note: The term of office was extended.)

== See also ==
- Batang Regency
- List of incumbent regional heads and deputy regional heads in Central Java
