= Kendaldoyong =

Village in Pemalang Regency, Central Java, Indonesia

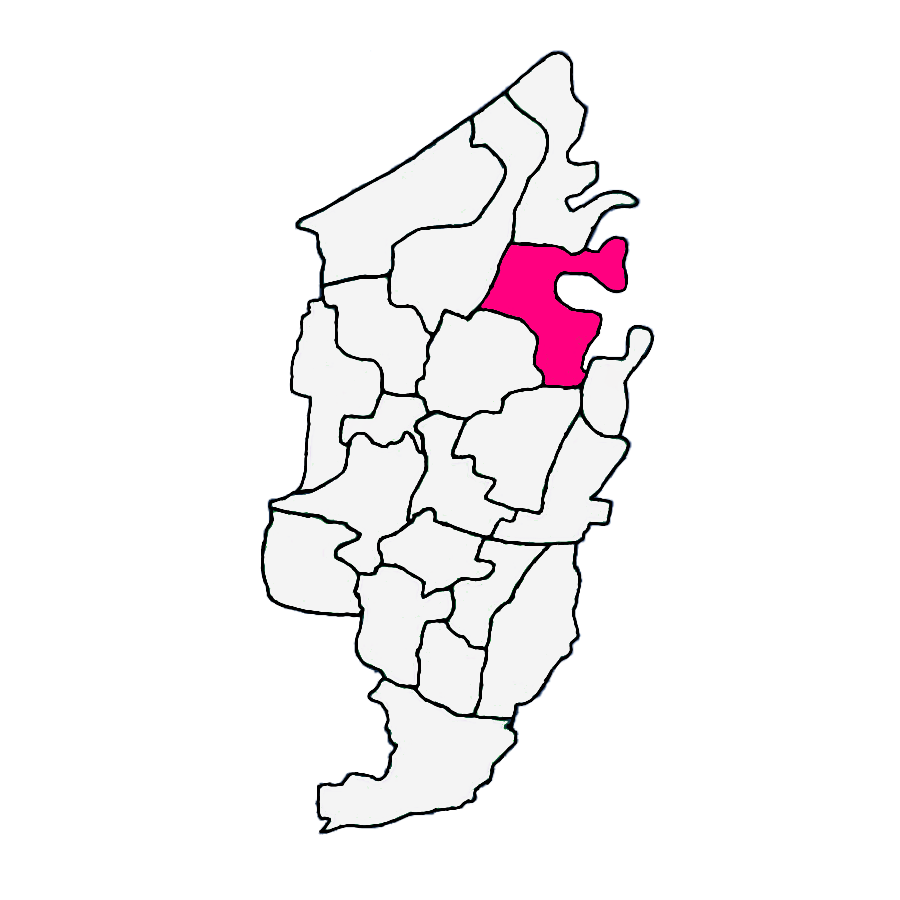
Location of Kendaldoyong village in Petarukan, Pemalang

Kendaldoyong (Indonesian pronunciation: [kəndalˈdɔjɔŋ]) is a village in the town of Petarukan, Pemalang Regency, Central Java Province, Indonesia. This villages has an area of 3,36 km² and a population of 12,936 inhabitants in 2022.
