= Panjunan, Petarukan, Pemalang =

Village in Central Java, Indonesia

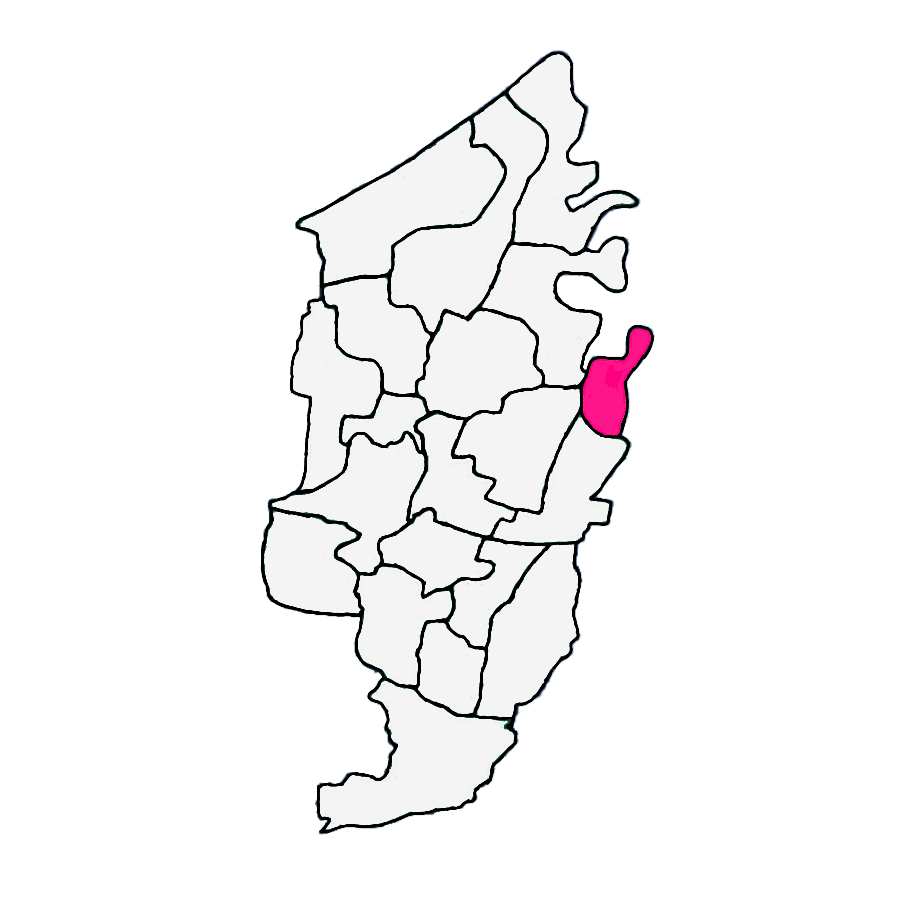
Location of Panjunan village in Petarukan, Pemalang

Panjunan (Indonesian pronunciation: [paɲˈd͡ʒunan]) is a village in the town of Petarukan, Pemalang Regency, Central Java Province, Indonesia. This villages has an area of 1,53 km^{2} and a population of 4,173 inhabitants in 2022.
