= Hendrar Prihadi =

Indonesian politician (born 1971)

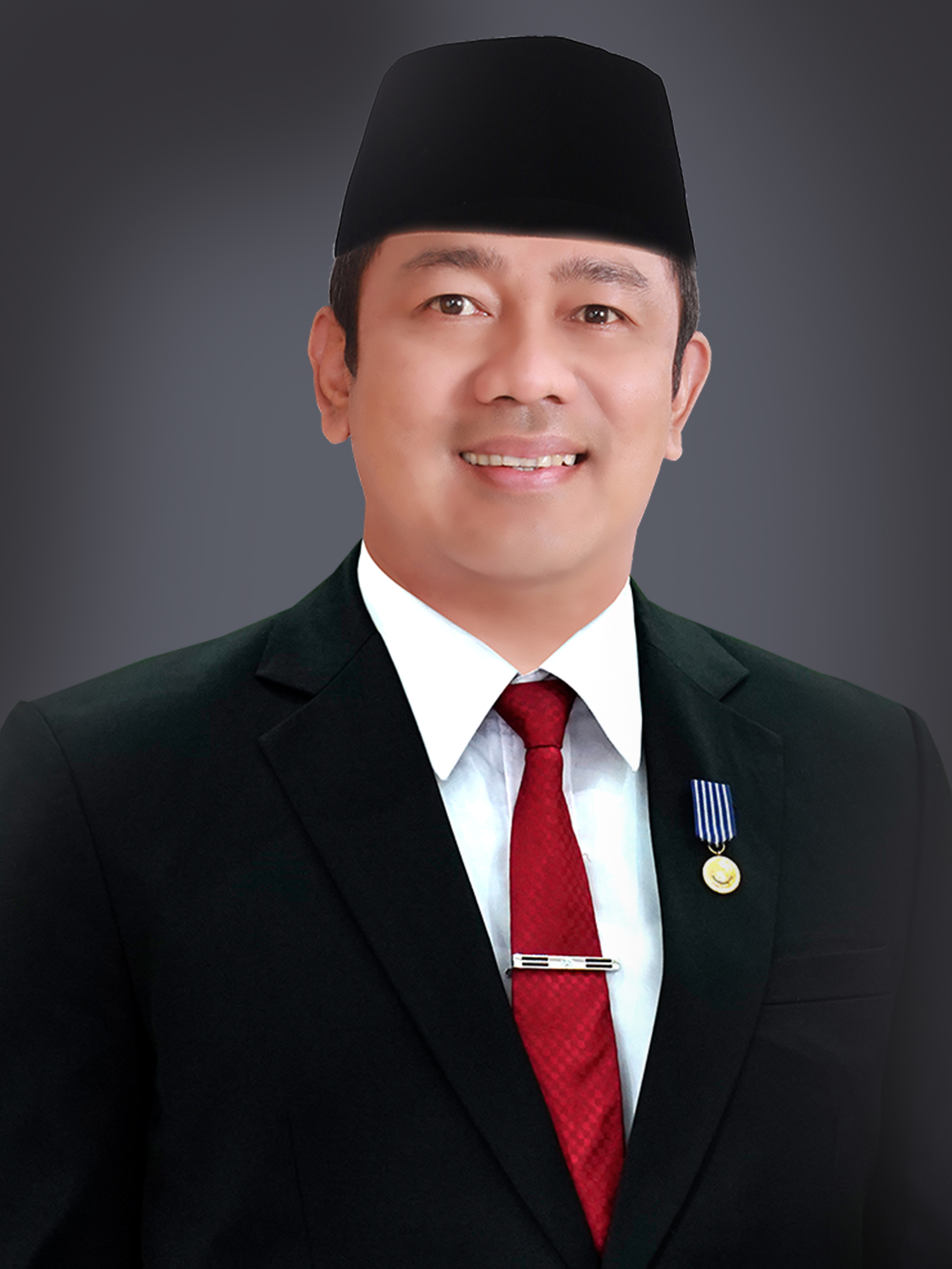
- A photo of Hendrar Prihadi when he served as Chairman of the Government Goods/Services Procurement Policy Institute of the Republic of Indonesia (LKPP)

Head of the Government Goods/Services Procurement Policy Institute of the Republic of Indonesia (LKPP)
- Incumbent
- Assumed office 10 October 2022
- President: Joko Widodo
- Preceded by: Abdullah Azwar Anas; Sarah Sadiqa (Interim)

14th Mayor of Semarang
- In office 21 October 2013 – 10 October 2022
- President: Susilo Bambang Yudhoyono; Joko Widodo
- Governor: Ganjar Pranowo
- Preceded by: Soemarmo Hadi Saputro
- Succeeded by: Hevearita Gunaryanti Rahayu

Deputy Mayor of Semarang
- In office 19 July 2010 – 21 October 2013
- President: Susilo Bambang Yudhoyono
- Governor: Bibit Waluyo; Ganjar Pranowo
- Preceded by: Mahfudz Ali
- Succeeded by: Hevearita Gunaryanti Rahayu

Personal details
- Born: 30 March 1971 (age 55) Semarang, Central Java, Indonesia
- Party: PDI-P
- Spouse: Krisseptiana
- Children: 3
- Education: Soegijapranata Catholic University; Diponegoro University

Hendrar Prihadi (born 30 March 1971), sometimes nicknamed Hendi, is an Indonesia politician from the Indonesian Democratic Party of Struggle (PDI-P), Chairman of the Government Goods/Services Procurement Policy Institute of the Republic of Indonesia (LKPP) since 10 October 2022, and Mayor of Semarang for the period 2013–2022, following his predecessor's arrest over a corruption charge, Soemarmo Hadi Saputro. He resigned the mayoralty in November 2022, and was succeeded by his deputy, Hevearita Gunaryanti Rahayu.

== Personal life ==
Prihadi completed his first 12 years of education before graduating from Soegijapranata Catholic University in 1997, and later he earned his Masters in Management from Diponegoro University in 2002, all in Semarang. During his education, he served as president of several youth organizations in the provincial level.

He married Krisseptiana in 5 December 1997, and the couple has 3 children.

== Career ==
Before becoming active in the city government, Prihadi worked in several companies and served as an official of the Central Java branch of KADIN (Kamar Dagang dan Industri Indonesia, Indonesian Board of Trade and Industry) which was an organization of Indonesian businessmen, in addition to the Semarang branch of the PSSI.

=== Political career ===
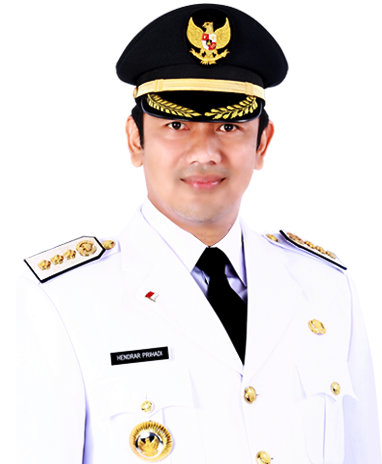
Hendrar Prihadi's previous official photo as Mayor of Semarang

After serving in the city council for 3 months, Prihadi was elected as deputy mayor along with Soemarmo after winning 34.28% of the votes. Following Soemarmo's arrest in 2013 over a corruption charge, Prihadi was elevated to mayor and later won in the 2015 elections after him and his deputy Hevearita Gunaryanti won 319,076 votes (46.32%).

=== Career after ending position as Mayor of Semarang ===
On October 10, 2022, he officially stepped down as Mayor of Semarang and served as Head of the Government Goods/Services Procurement Policy Institute of the Republic of Indonesia (LKPP).
