= Petarukan, Petarukan, Pemalang =

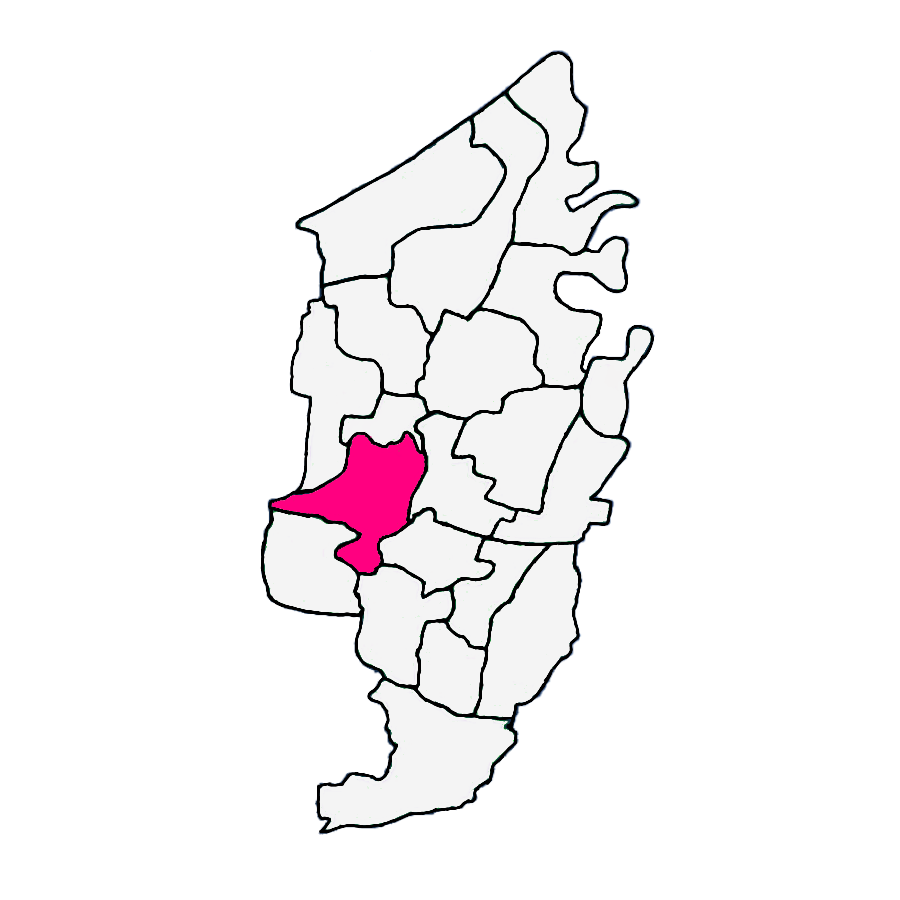
Location of Petarukan village in Petarukan, Pemalang

Petarukan (Indonesian pronunciation: [pət̪aˈrukan]) is an urban village in the district of Petarukan, Pemalang Regency, Central Java Province, Indonesia. This villages has an area of 4,59 km² and had a population of 21,574 inhabitants in 2024.
