= Bulu, Petarukan =

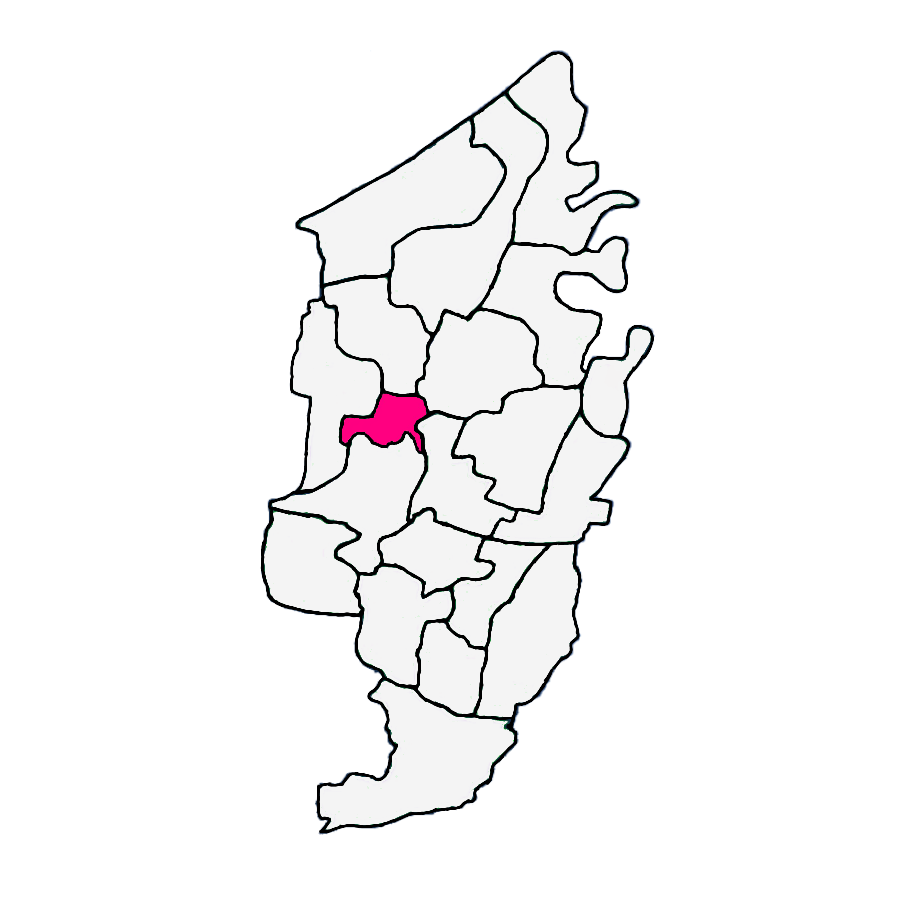
Location of Bulu village in Petarukan, Pemalang

Bulu (Indonesian pronunciation: [ˈbulu]) is a village in the town of Petarukan, Pemalang Regency, Central Java Province, Indonesia. This villages has an area of 1,42 km² and a population of 5,651 inhabitants in 2022.
