= Pegundan =

Village in Central Java, Indonesia

Coordinates: 6°51′57″S 109°28′30″E

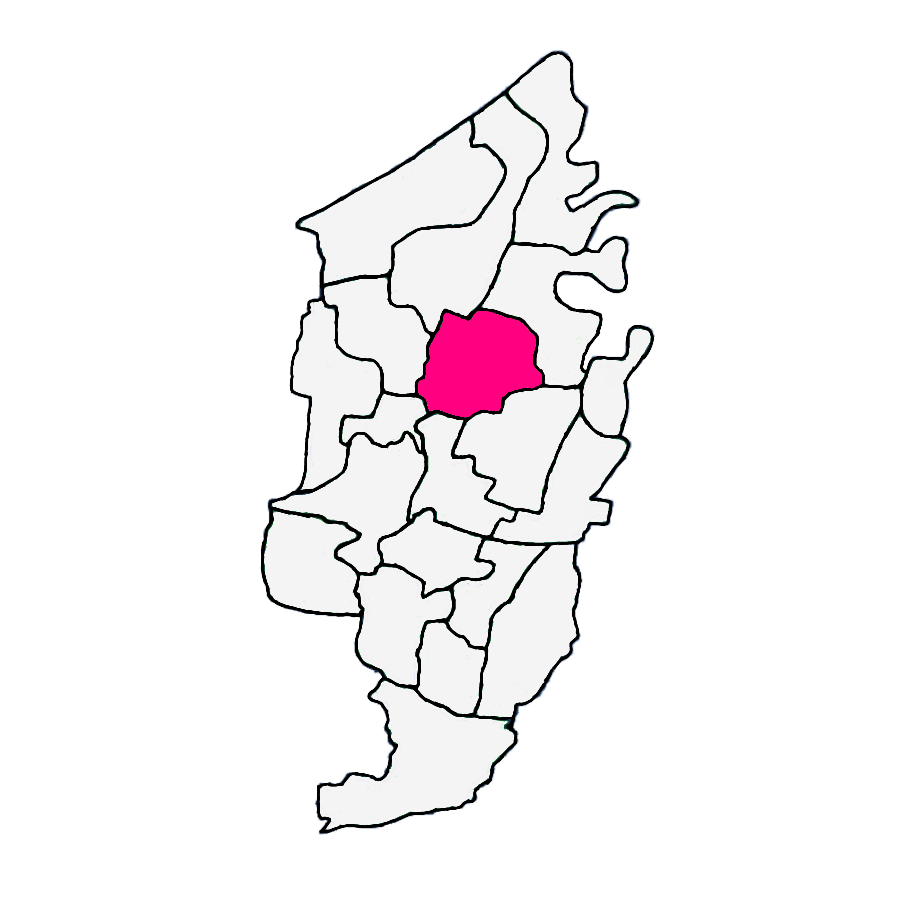
Location of Pegundan village in Petarukan, Pemalang

Pegundan (Indonesian pronunciation: [pəˌɡundan]) is a village in the town of Petarukan, Pemalang Regency, Central Java Province, Indonesia. This villages has an area of 3,59 km^{2} and a population of 12,837 inhabitants in 2022.
