= Kalirandu =

Village in Pemalang Regency, Central Java, Indonesia

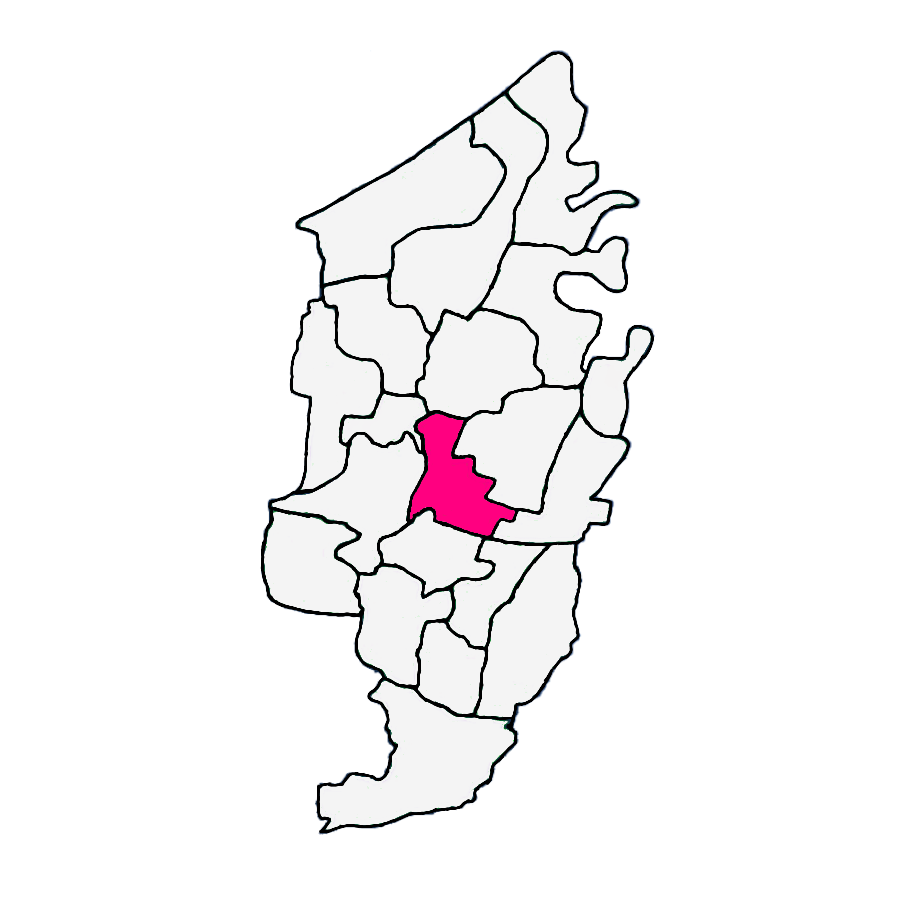
Location of Kalirandu village in Petarukan, Pemalang

Kalirandu (Indonesian pronunciation: [kaliˈrandu]) is a village in the town of Petarukan, Pemalang Regency, Central Java Province, Indonesia. It has an area of 1.74 km² and a population of 9,598 inhabitants in 2022.
