= Kendalsari, Petarukan, Pemalang =

Village in Central Java Province, Indonesia

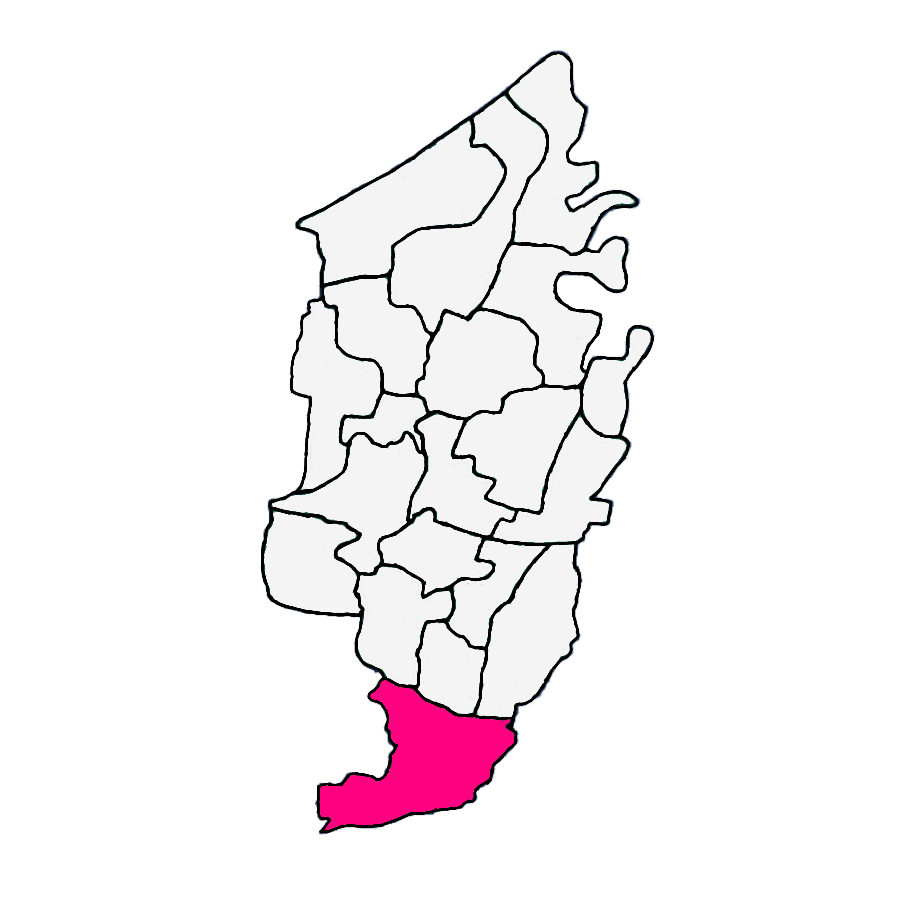
Location of Kendalsari village in Petarukan, Pemalang

Kendalsari (Indonesian pronunciation: [kəndalˈsari]) is a village in the town of Petarukan, Pemalang Regency, Central Java Province, Indonesia. This villages has an area of 6,71 km^{2} and a population of 13,350 inhabitants in 2022.
