= 2024 Semarang mayoral election =

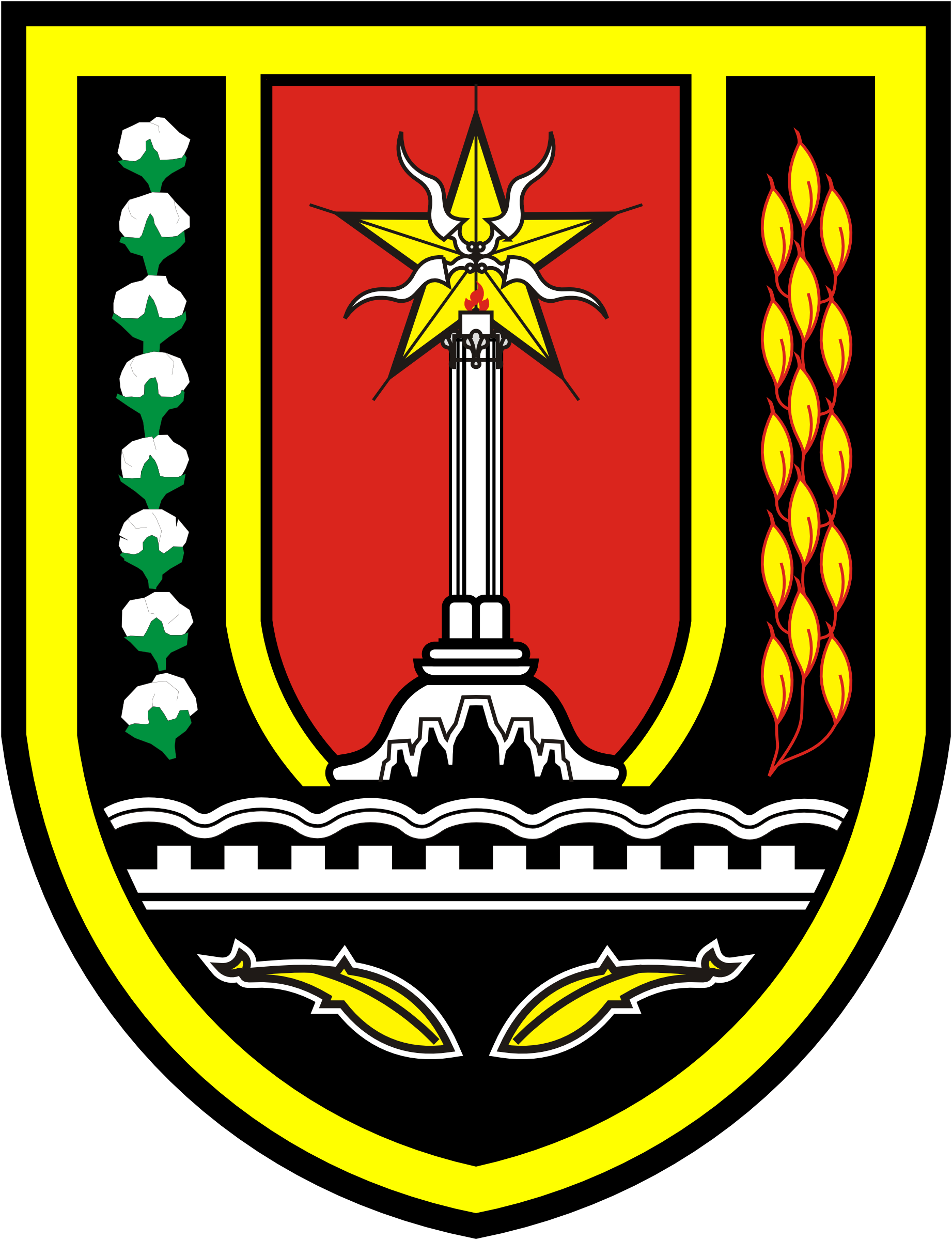
- 27 November 2024
- Turnout: 71.41%

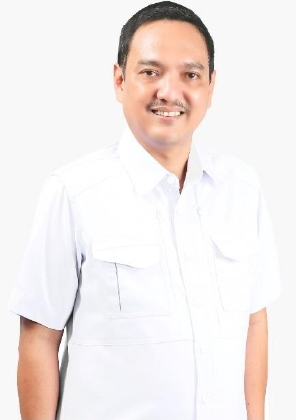
Candidate	Agustina Wilujeng Pramestuti	Yoyok Sukawi
Party	PDI-P	Demokrat
Running mate	Iswar Aminuddin	Joko Santoso
popular vote	486,423	363,331
Percentage	57.24%	42.76%
- Results by district and subdistrict (Interactive version)
Mayor before election
Hevearita Gunaryanti Rahayu
PDI-P
Elected mayor
Agustina Wilujeng Pramestuti
PDI-P

The 2024 Semarang mayoral election was held on 27 November 2024 as part of the 2024 Indonesian local elections to elect the mayor and vice mayor of Semarang for a five-year term. The previous election was held in 2020. The election was won by Agustina Wilujeng Pramestuti of the Indonesian Democratic Party of Struggle (PDI-P), a former member of the House of Representatives (DPR-RI) who received 57% of the vote. Her sole opponent, Yoyok Sukawi of the Democratic Party, a fellow former DPR-RI member, received 42%.

== Electoral system ==
The election, like other local elections in 2024, follow the first-past-the-post system where the candidate with the most votes wins the election, even if they do not win a majority. It is possible for a candidate to run uncontested, in which case the candidate is still required to win a majority of votes "against" an "empty box" option. Should the candidate fail to do so, the election will be repeated on a later date.

== Candidates ==
According to electoral regulations, in order to qualify for the election, candidates were required to secure support from a political party or a coalition of parties controlling 10 seats in the Semarang City Regional House of Representatives (DPRD). The Indonesian Democratic Party of Struggle, with 14 seats, is the only party eligible to nominate a candidate without forming a coalition. Candidates may alternatively demonstrate support in form of photocopies of identity cards, which in Semarang's case corresponds to 80,579 copies. No such candidates registered with the General Elections Commission (KPU) prior to the deadline.

=== Declared ===
These are candidates who have been allegedly delegated by political parties endorsing for gubernatorial election:

1
Candidate from PDI-P and Independent
Agustina Wilujeng Pramestuti	Iswar Aminuddin
for Mayor	for Vice Mayor
Member of DPR RI PDI-P (2014–2024)	Secretary of Regional Semarang City, Semarang Figure
Parties
14 / 50 (28%) PDI-P (14 seats)

2
Candidate from Demokrat and Gerindra
Yoyok Sukawi	Joko Santoso
for Mayor	for Vice Mayor
Member of DPR RI Demokrat (2019–2024)	Member of DPRD Semarang Gerindra (2019–2024)
Parties
36 / 50 (72%) Gerindra (7 seats); Demokrat (6 seats); PKS (6 seats); PKB (5 seats); PSI (5 seats); Golkar (4 seats); Nasdem (1 seat); PAN (1 seat); PPP (1 seat)

=== Potential ===
The following are individuals who have either been publicly mentioned as a potential candidate by a political party in the DPRD, publicly declared their candidacy with press coverage, or considered as a potential candidate by media outlets:

- Hevearita Gunaryanti Rahayu (PDI-P), incumbent mayor.
- Yoyok Sukawi (Demokrat), CEO of the football club PSIS Semarang.
- Iswar Aminuddin, city secretary of Semarang.
- Bambang Eko Purnomo (Demokrat), member of the Central Java Regional House of Representatives and chairman of the Central Java branch of the Pemuda Pancasila organization.
- Ade Bhakti, secretary of Semarang's fire service.
- Arnaz Agung Andrarasmara, chairman of Semarang's chamber of commerce.

== Political map ==
Following the 2024 Indonesian legislative election, ten political parties are represented in the Semarang City DPRD:

Political parties	Seat count
Indonesian Democratic Party of Struggle (PDI-P)	14 / 50
Great Indonesia Movement Party (Gerindra)	7 / 50
Prosperous Justice Party (PKS)	6 / 50
Democratic Party (Demokrat)	6 / 50
National Awakening Party (PKB)	5 / 50
Indonesian Solidarity Party (PSI)	5 / 50
Party of Functional Groups (Golkar)	4 / 50
NasDem Party	1 / 50
National Mandate Party (PAN)	1 / 50
United Development Party (PPP)	1 / 50

== Opinion polls ==
=== Pre-election polls ===
Poll source	Date	Sample size				Lead	Error margin
Poll source	Date	Sample size	Hevearita Gunaryanti Rahayu PDI-P	Yoyok Sukawi Demokrat	Ade Bhakti Independent	Lead	Error margin
Indo Riset Strategis	8–14 June 2024	600	33.5%%	26.8%	10.3%	6.7%	+/- 4.08%

== Results ==
Turnout by district and subdistrict

Candidate	Running mate	Party	Votes	%
Agustina Wilujeng Pramesti	Iswar Aminuddin	Indonesian Democratic Party of Struggle	486,423	57.24
Yoyok Sukawi	Joko Santoso	Democratic Party	363,331	42.76
Total			849,754	100.00
Valid votes			849,754	94.05
Invalid/blank votes			53,723	5.95
Total votes			903,477	100.00
Registered voters/turnout			1,265,192	71.41
Source: General Elections Commission

=== Results by district ===
City/Regency	①		②		Valid		Invalid		Total votes	Turnout	
City/Regency	Votes	%	Votes	%	Votes	%	Votes	%	Total votes	Voters	%
Banyumanik	40,900	56.87%	31,022	43.13%	71,922	94.00%	4,587	6.00%	76,509	106,779	71.65%
Candisari	24,181	62.21%	14,691	37.79%	38,872	94.03%	2,467	5.97%	41,339	57,909	71.39%
Gajahmungkur	15,738	54.97%	12,890	45.03%	28,628	93.99%	1,830	6.01%	30,458	43,891	69.39%
Gayamsari	21,922	62.12%	13,366	37.88%	35,288	93.26%	2,551	6.74%	37,839	53,125	71.23%
Genuk	35,346	55.19%	28,700	44.81%	64,046	94.84%	3,483	5.16%	67,529	91,356	73.92%
Gunungpati	29,028	53.80%	24,932	46.20%	53,960	94.10%	3,383	5.90%	57,343	74,789	76.67%
Mijen	21,105	51.54%	19,843	48.46%	40,948	94.22%	2,511	5.78%	43,459	60,037	72.39%
Ngaliyan	36,994	48.87%	38,707	51.13%	75,701	94.00%	4,828	6.00%	80,529	108,442	74.26%
Pedurungan	53,084	54.70%	43,961	45.30%	97,045	93.79%	6,428	6.21%	103,473	147,681	70.07%
Semarang Barat	45,924	60.01%	30,599	39.99%	76,523	94.29%	4,630	5.71%	81,153	115,551	70.23%
Semarang Selatan	21,692	66.55%	10,901	33.45%	32,593	93.48%	2,273	6.52%	34,866	51,037	68.32%
Semarang Tengah	20,055	71.05%	8,171	28.95%	28,226	94.67%	1,589	5.33%	29,815	45,097	66.11%
Semarang Timur	22,230	65.36%	11,784	34.64%	34,014	93.80%	2,249	6.20%	36,263	53,554	67.71%
Semarang Utara	36,402	58.64%	25,672	41.36%	62,074	94.64%	3,517	5.36%	65,591	89,724	73.10%
Tembalang	50,725	54.86%	41,737	45.14%	92,462	93.59%	6,335	6.41%	98,797	141,375	69.88%
Tugu	11,097	63.59%	6,355	36.41%	17,452	94.26%	1,062	5.74%	18,514	24,845	74.52%
Total	486,423	57.24%	363,331	42.76%	849,754	94.05%	53,723	5.95%	903,477	1,265,192	71.41%
Source: General Elections Commission
