= Agustina Wilujeng Pramestuti =

Indonesian politician (born 1971)

16th Mayor of Semarang
- Incumbent
- Assumed office 20 February 2025
- President: Prabowo Subianto
- Governor: Ahmad Luthfi
- Deputy: Iswar Aminuddin
- Preceded by: Hevearita Gunaryanti Rahayu

Member of the People's Representative Council of the Republic of Indonesia
- In office 1 October 2014 – 24 September 2024
- President: Susilo Bambang Yudhoyono; Joko Widodo
- Speaker: Setya Novanto (2014–2015); Ade Komarudin (2016); Setya Novanto (2016–2017); Bambang Soesatyo (2018–2019); Puan Maharani (2019–2020)
- Parliamentary group: Indonesian Democratic Party of Struggle Faction
- Constituency: Central Java IV

Personal details
- Born: August 11, 1971 (age 55) Semarang, Central Java, Indonesia
- Party: Indonesian Democratic Party of Struggle
- Spouse: Vincentius Djoko Riyanto (died 2025)
- Children: 3
- Education: Diponegoro University (S.S., Dr.); Sultan Agung Islamic University (M.M.)
- Occupation: Politician

Agustina Wilujeng Pramestuti (born 11 August 1971) is an Indonesian politician, who served as a member of the Indonesian House of Representatives for the 2014–2019 and 2019–2024 terms representing the Indonesian Democratic Party of Struggle Faction and the electoral district of Central Java IV. Since 20 February 2025, she has served as Mayor of Semarang for the 2025–2030 term, after being inaugurated by President Prabowo Subianto at the Istana Negara, Jakarta. Previously, she

Pramestuti won the 2024 Semarang mayoral election, with Iswar Aminuddin, Regional Secretary of Semarang City for the 2019–2024 term, as her running mate. They won 486.423 votes or 57,24% of the total valid votes.

Political offices
Preceded by Hevearita Gunaryanti Rahayu	Mayor of Semarang; 2025–now	Succeeded by Incumbent
