= Loning, Indonesia =

Village in Central Java, Indonesia

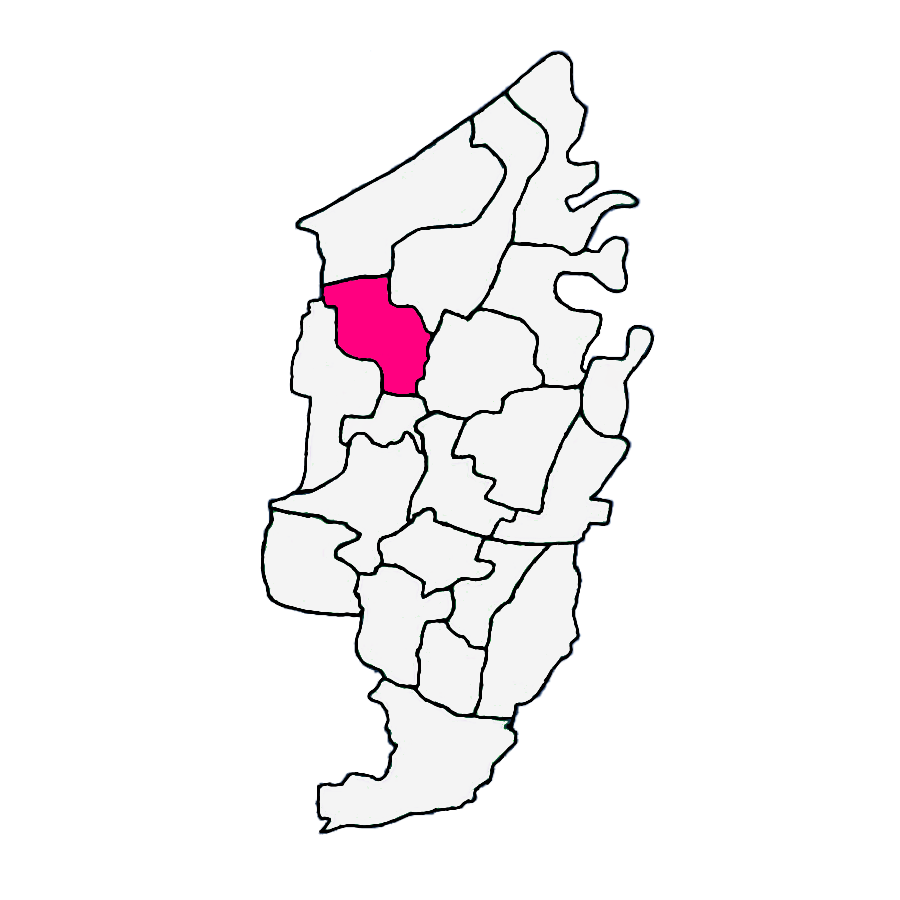
Location of Loning village in Petarukan, Pemalang

Loning (Indonesian pronunciation: [ˈlonɪŋ]) is a village in the town of Petarukan, Pemalang Regency, Central Java Province, Indonesia. This villages has an area of 3,87 km² and a population of 9,970 inhabitants in 2022.
