= Karangasem, Pemalang =

Village in Pemalang Regency, Central Java, Indonesia

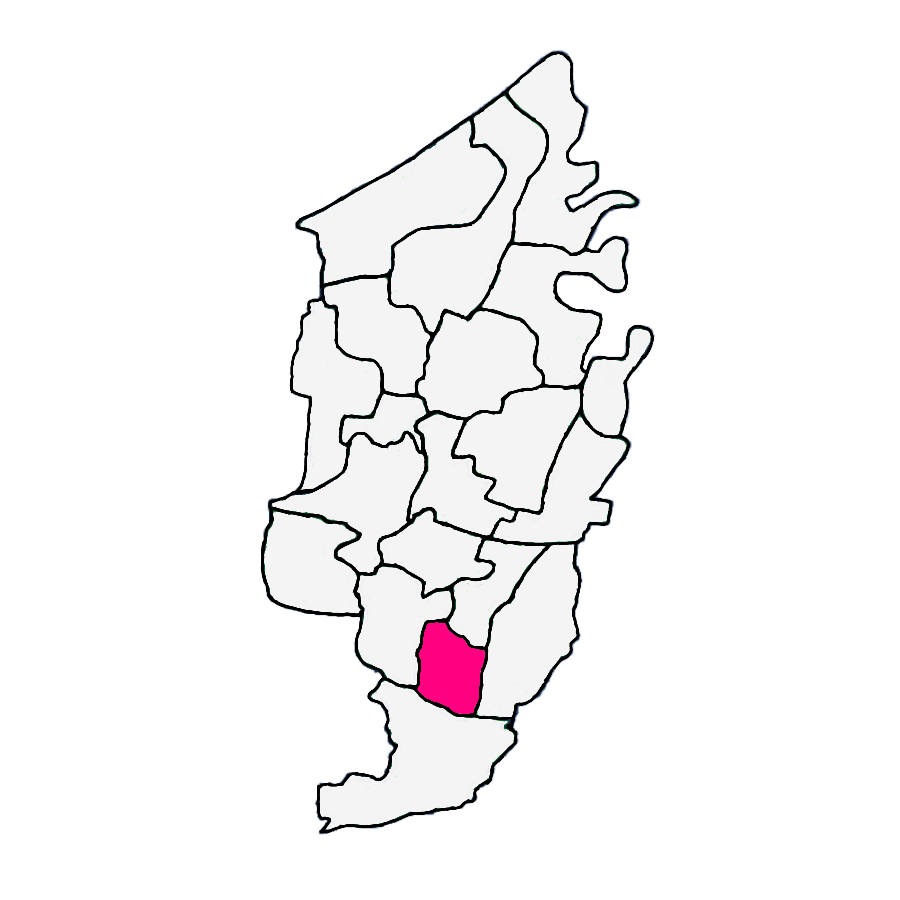
Location of Karangasem village in Petarukan, Pemalang

Karangasem (Indonesian pronunciation: [karaˈŋasəm]) is a village in the town of Petarukan, Pemalang Regency, Central Java Province, Indonesia. This villages has an area of 2,59 km² and a population of 4,526 inhabitants in 2022.
