= Anom Widiyantoro =

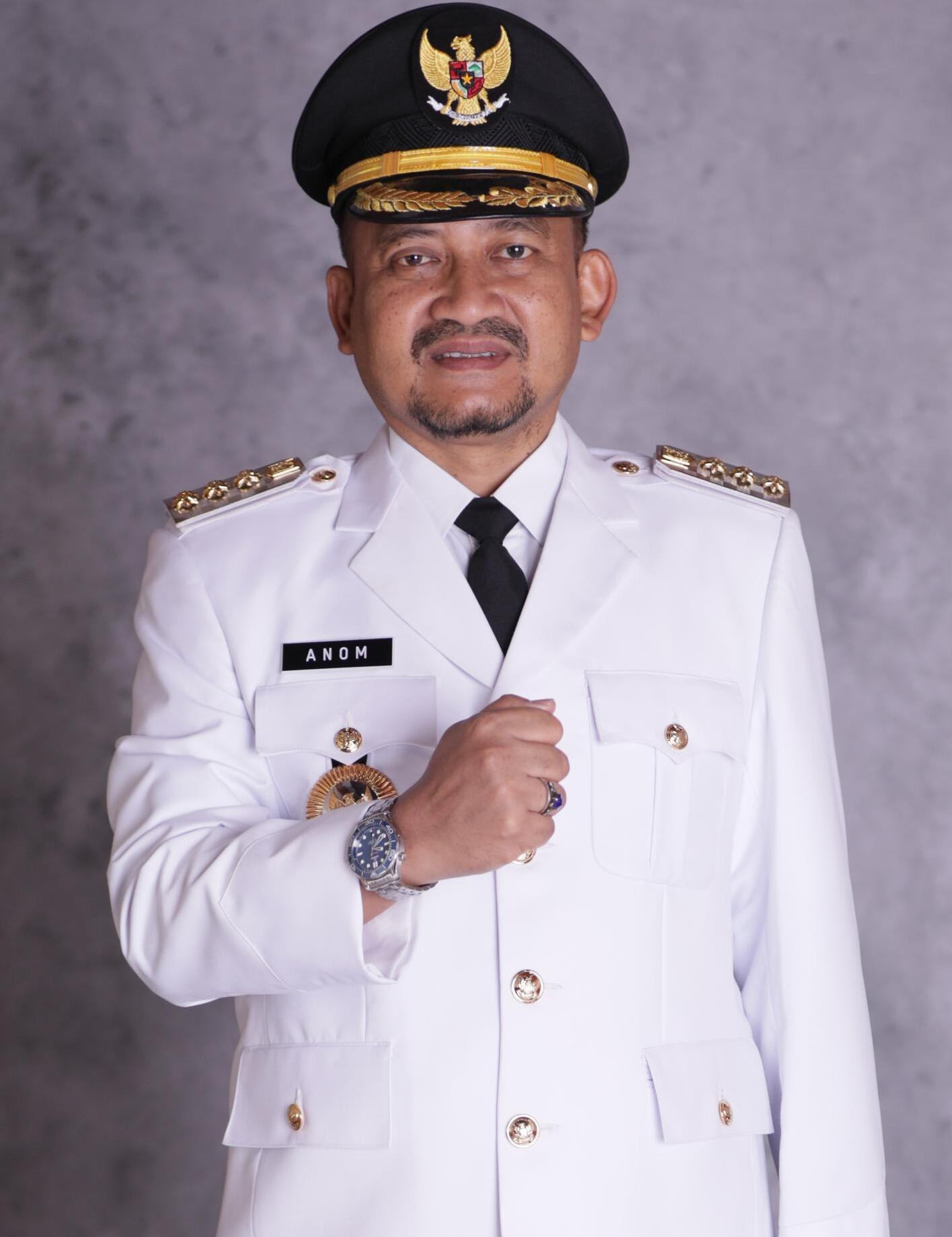
- Widiyantoro in 2025

Regent of Pemalang
- Incumbent
- Assumed office 20 February 2025
- Preceded by: Mansur Hidayat

Personal details
- Born: 20 March 1970 (age 56) Cimahi, West Java, Indonesia

Anom Widiyantoro (born 20 March 1970) is an Indonesian politician and business executive who has served as the regent of Pemalang, Central Java since February 2025. Before becoming a politician, Widiyantoro had been an executive at the state-owned firm Wijaya Karya.

== Early life ==
Anom Widiyantoro was born in Cimahi, West Java on 20 March 1970. After completing middle school there and high school at a public school in nearby Bandung in 1989, he studied economics at Diponegoro University in Semarang, receiving his bachelors in 1996. He later received a master's in economics and business from Padjadjaran University in Bandung (2005).

== Career ==
After graduating from Diponegoro, Widiyantoro began to work at the state-owned construction company Wijaya Karya, starting as an expert staffer. He was promoted several times throughout his career, until he was a general manager in 2021. Widiyantoro then joined PT Hotel Indonesia Properti, a subsidiary of Wijaya Karya, as a director for finance, risk management, and human capital.

In 2024, he resigned as a state-owned company employee in order to run in Pemalang Regency's 2024 regency election. Widiyantoro and Nurkholes won 278,043 votes (44.51%) in the three-way race, winning the election. They were sworn in on 20 February 2025.

As regent, Widiyantoro launched an anti-tuberculosis campaign, announcing a target of discovering and handling 23 thousand cases in the municipal health service within 2025. On 29 July 2026, he was arrested in a sting operation by the Corruption Eradication Commission, with Rp 2 billion (USD 110,000) in cash confiscated during the arrest. The following day, he was designated as a suspect for extortion of civil servants and private businessmen.

== Personal life ==
Widiyantoro married Noor Faizah Maenofie in 1999, and the couple has two children. The two had met during an internship program. Aside from his political and BUMN work, Widiyantoro also owns a cafe in Pemalang, which frequently hosts musicians and artistic competitions he sponsored.
