= Ischak Maulana Rohman =

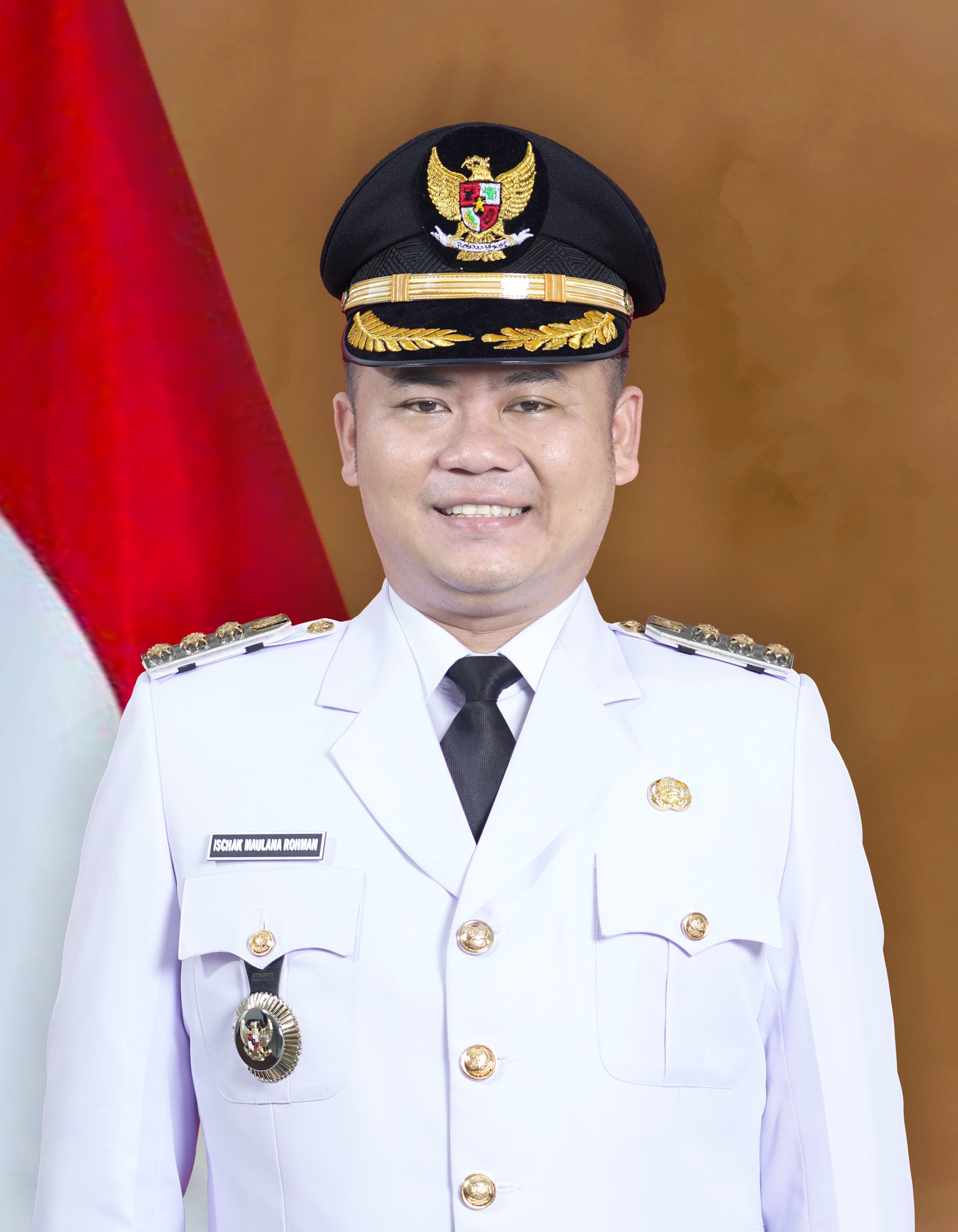

Regent of Tegal
- Incumbent
- Assumed office 20 February 2025
- Preceded by: Umi Azizah; Amir Makhmud (act.)

Personal details
- Born: 29 December 1993 (age 32) Tegal, Central Java, Indonesia
- Party: National Awakening Party

Ischak Maulana Rohman (born 29 December 1993) is an Indonesian politician of the National Awakening Party who is has served as the regent of Tegal Regency, Central Java since February 2025.

== Early life ==
Ischak Maulana Rohman was born on 29 December 1993 in Tegal Regency, Central Java. He was the fifth of eight children of Nurohman Nasori and Siti Sulastri. He completed his elementary and middle school studies at regular state schools, and in 2011 he graduated from a state-funded trade school (SMK Negeri) in Adiwerna. He continued his studies at a maritime academy in Semarang, receiving his diploma in 2015.

He later obtained a bachelor's degree in law in 2021 and master's degree in management in 2026, both from Tegal's Pancasakti University.

== Career ==
Rohman worked in the construction business, and in 2021 was elected chairman of Tegal Regency's construction association. He also became an active member of Nahdlatul Ulama's youth organization GP Ansor.

In the 2024 Tegal regency election, Rohman ran as a member of the National Awakening Party. The party chose to nominate Rohman over fellow party member and incumbent regent Umi Azizah. He ran with Ahmad Kholid, a Gerindra politician, and the pair won the election with 542,236 votes (67.88%). He was sworn in on 20 February 2025.

As regent, Rohman established a "one village, one bachelor" program, which provided around 300 scholarships to Tegal's residents to various institutions of higher learning in the regency.

== Personal life ==
Rohman is married to Nilna Almuna, and the couple has two children.
