= Pemalang Regency =

Regency in Central Java, Indonesia

Pemalang Regency Kabupaten Pemalang
- Regency

Other transcription(s)
  - Hanacaraka: ꦥꦸꦂꦮꦺꦴꦑꦺꦂꦠꦺꦴ
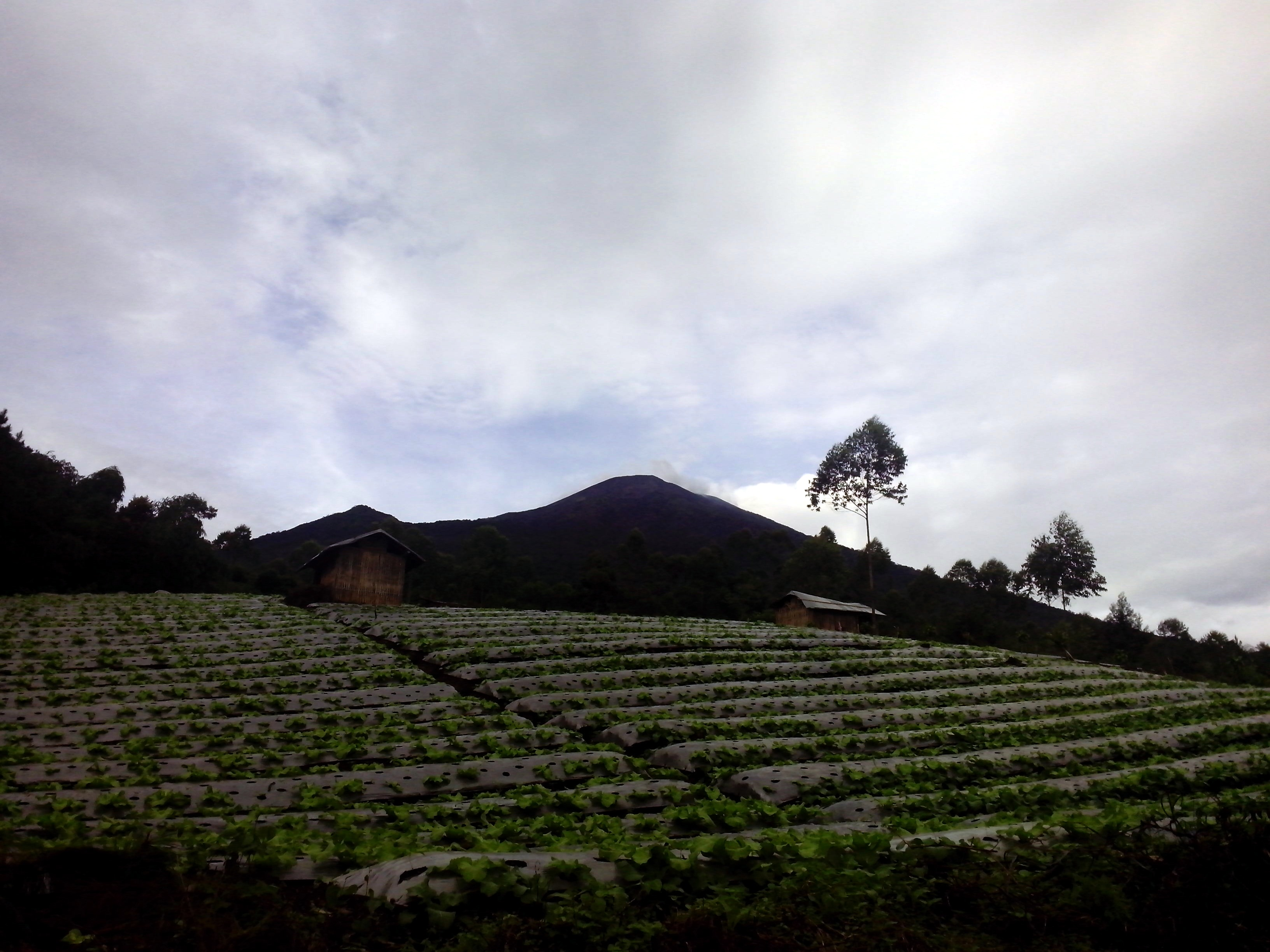
- Cabbage farm with the peak of Mount Slamet in the background in Camara hamlet of Batursari village, Pemalang.

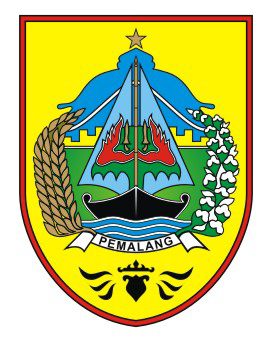
- Coat of arms
- Motto: Pemalang IKHLAS (Indah, Komunikatif, Hijau, Lancar, Aman, Sehat) (Lovely, Communicative, Green, Smooth, Safe, Healthy)
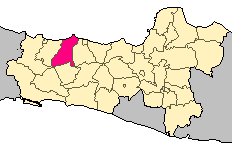
- Location within Central Java

- Location in Java Location in Indonesia
- Coordinates: 6°53′26″S 109°22′51″E
- Country: Indonesia
- Province: Central Java
- Established: 1 January
- Capital: Pemalang

Government
  - Regent: Anom Widiyantoro
  - Vice Regent: Nurkholes

Area
  - Total: 1,115.30 km^{2} (430.62 sq mi)

Population (mid 2025 estimate)
  - Total: 1,559,306
  - Density: 1,398.10/km^{2} (3,621.07/sq mi)
- Time zone: UTC+7 (WIB)
- Area code: 0284
- Vehicle registration: G
- Website: pemalangkab.go.id

Pemalang Regency is a regency (Indonesian: kabupaten) on the north coast of Central Java province in Indonesia. Its capital is the town of Pemalang. The regency is bordered by the Java Sea to the north, by Pekalongan Regency to the east, by Purbalingga Regency to the south, and by Tegal Regency to the west. It covers an area of 1,115.30 km^{2}, and it had a population of 1,261,353 at the 2010 Census and 1,471,489 at the 2020 Census; the official estimate as of mid-2025 was 1,559,306 (comprising 789,560 males and 769,746 females).

== History ==
=== Pre Mataram ===
Archaeological evidence demonstrates settlement in Pemalang during prehistoric times. The findings of the punden and baths in the north-west of Moga District. Ganesha statue, phallus, graves and tombstones in the village of Keropak. Besides archaeological evidence that suggests the existence of an Islamic cultural elements can also be connected such as the grave of Sheikh Maulana Maghribi in Comal Kawedanan. There is also the grave of Rohidin, Sayyid uncle of Sunan Ampel Ngali who had a mission to convert the local population.

Pemalang's existence in the 16th century can be attributed to van Goens Rijkloff records and data in the book of W. Fruin Mees stated that in 1575 Pemalang is one of 14 independent regions in Java, led by a prince or a king. In a later development, and Panembahan Seda Senopati Panembahan Krapyak of Mataram conquered these areas, including Pemalang. Since then, Pemalang has become vassals of the Mataram area ruled by princes or vassal kings.

Pemalang and Kendal in the period before the 17th century were areas more important than Tegal, Pekalongan and Semarang, because of the highway linking the northern coast to the hinterland of Central Java (Mataram) that crosses Pemalang and Wiradesa, regarded as the oldest road connecting the two regions.

As the population of rural settlements that have regularly appeared in the early centuries AD to the period of the 14th and 15th centuries, and then growing rapidly in the 16th century, which increased during the development of Islam in Java under a kingdom of Demak, Cirebon and then Mataram.

At that time Pemalang had successfully established traditional governance in the years around 1575. Figure origins of Pajang named Prince Benawa. The Prince is King Jipang origin who succeeded his father who had died, Sultan Adiwijaya.

The position of the king was preceded by a bitter feud between him and Aria Pangiri.

Prince Benawa only ruled for one year. Local belief states that Prince Benawa died in Pemalang, and was buried in the village of Penggarit (now the Heroes Cemetery Penggarit).

=== Duchy subordinate to Mataram ===
Pemalang into administrative territorial unit steady since R. Mangoneng, Pangonen or Mangunoneng became ruler Pemalang region centered on Hamlet Oneng, Bojongbata village in about 1622. During this period Pemalang was an appanage of Prince Purbaya of Mataram. According to some sources Mangoneng R was a figure that local leaders supporting the policy of Sultan Agung. A character who is very anti-VOC. Thus Mangoneng can be seen as a leader, soldier, warrior and hero of the nation in the fight against the Dutch colonization in the 17th century is the struggle against the Dutch under the banner of Sultan Agung of Mataram.

In about 1652, Sunan Ingabehi Subajaya Amangkurat II lifted into the Regent Pemalang after Amangkurat II established rule in Mataram throne after uprising Trunajaya extinguished with the help of the VOC in 1678.

=== Diponegoro War ===
According to the Dutch in 1820 Pemalang was then ruled by a regent named Mas Tumenggung Suralaya. At this time Pemalang was closely associated with the character Kanjeng Swargi or Kanjeng Pontang, a regent involved in the war Diponegoro. Swargi Kanjeng was also known as Gusti Sepuh, and during the war he managed to flee to the Netherlands Sigeseng or Kendaldoyong. The tomb of Gusti Sepuh can be identified as the tomb of Kanjeng Swargi or Reksodiningrat. In times of year reign between 1823 and 1825 i.e. during Reksadiningrat Regents. Note Netherlands said that the persistent assist the Dutch in the Diponegoro war in the North Coast area of Java just – regent regent Tegal, Kendal and rods without mentioning Regent Pemalang.

Meanwhile, in another part of the book P.J.F. Louw, entitled De Java Oorlog van 1825 -1830 reported that Van den Resident Poet organize some good lineup of Tegal, Pemalang and Bradford to defend themselves from Diponegoro in September 1825 until the end of January 1826. Involvement in helping the Dutch Pemalang this can be attributed with the Dutch statement stating Duke Reksodiningrat only officially recorded as regent until 1825 Pemalang. deployment and probable events that occur after the Pemalang Reksodiningrat Duke joins forces which resulted in the Dutch Diponegoro stop Regent Reksodiningrat.

In 1832 the Regent Pemalang Mbahurekso was Raden Tumenggung Sumo Negoro. At that time due to the success of abundant prosperity of agriculture in the area of Pemalang. Pemalang is a producer of rice, coffee, tobacco and peanuts. In a report published at the beginning of the 20th century, stated that Pemalang a Karisidenan department and the District of Pekalongan. Pemalang section divided into two Pemalang and Randudongkal. And the Regency was divided into 5 districts. So thus Pemalang a district name, district and Onder Karisidenan District of Pekalongan, Central Java Province.

First of all district center located in the village of Oneng. Although there are no remnants of this district, but still found another clue. Instructions in the form of a hamlet named Oneng which can still be found today in the village of Bojongbata. While all district centers are both confirmed to be in Ketandan. The remains of the building can still be seen today is around Ketandan Clinic (Department of Health). The third district is the center of the current district (all district near Town Square Pemalang). The district is now also the rest of the buildings built by the Dutch colonial. Which subsequently went through several rehab and renovation of buildings up to forms joglo as typical building in Central Java.

=== Dutch colonial period and beyond ===
Thus all of the regency had been established as an administrative entity after the Dutch colonial administration. In bureaucracy, all district administration also continued to be addressed. From the colonial bureaucratic forms that smells feudalistic bureaucracy towards more in line with developments in the present time.

=== New order ===
==== 1966–1967 ====
In 1966, after the 30 September Movement ended and the 11 March Order was passed, based on the Decree (SK) of the Governor of the Central Java Region Number 204 of 1965 dated 24 August 1965, the administrative divisions in Indonesia in all districts and municipalities in Central Java comprised as many as 347 units, including Pemalang Regency with nine districts (Indonesian: kecamatan), as an amalgamation of the existing royal districts. So at that time in Pemalang Regency nine districts had been formed, as a combination of the 18 former sultanate's districts. In 1966 the Pemalang Level II Region with a population of 1,248,851 people (in 1965) and an area of 199,215 hectares or 1,992.15 km^{2} still covered 3 Kawedanaan (an intermediate level that was soon abolished), 9 districts (kecamatan), and 124 new style villages (as a combination of 355 traditional former sultanate villages). In the same year, the construction period in Pemalang Regency had started. The first construction in 1967 was carried out on the construction of bridges, village roads, schools, waterways, irrigation canals, and markets, as well as widening of village roads, repair / renovation of bridges, roads, markets, schools, train stations and irrigation networks. In 1967, Pemalang train station began to be renovated.

==== 1981 ====
In 1981, based on the Decree of the Minister of Home Affairs number 140-502 of 1980 dated 22 September 1980 through the Decree of the Governor of the First Level Region of Central Java number 133-514 of 1980 dated 8 December 1980 and the Regional Regulation of the province of Central Java Number 9 In 1981 on 10 March 1981, in Pemalang Regency, fourteen urban village were formed, namely by changing the status of some villages to a kelurahan, namely six villages in Pemalang district, four villages in Taman district, two villages in Comal district, one village in Moga district, and one village in Petarukan district, all of which were designated as kelurahan.

==== 1984 ====
In further developments, in addition to changing the status of fourteen villages to that of kelurahan in 1984, based on the Decree of the Minister of Home Affairs number 138-210 of 1982 and Decree (SK) of the Governor of the First Level Region of Central Java number 150–216 in 1983, to be precise in Pemalang Regency, five district representative bodies were formed, namely representatives of Comal District (based in Lewokan), representatives of Moga District (which is based in Warungpring), representatives of Petarukan District (which is based in Langenharjo), representatives of Belik District (which is based in Kawangan / Kendalrejo), and representatives of Randudongkal District (based in Randusari).

== Anniversary and Sesanti ==
Local governments in Kabupaten Pemalang established the Pemalang Anniversary attribute as a form of recognition. It commemorates the history of the districts' formation and reflects the values of patriotism and heroism of the local population.

One alternative determination anniversary all districts was at the time a statement of Prince Diponegoro to levy war against the Dutch Colonial, which is dated 20 July 1823. However, based on the discussion of experts set up by the team all district, the so Pemalang is dated 24 January 1575, or coincide with POND Thursday 1st of Shawwal 1496 Hijri Je 982. The decision was further stipulated in Local Regulation regency of all district No. 9 of 1996 on the anniversary of all district. In 1575 to form the Solar sengkala realized Lunguding Word Wangsiting Gusti having literal meaning: wisdom, speech / Sabdo, teachings, messages, Lord, to have a value of 5751. While 1496 Je realized by Candra sengkala Tawakal Ambuko Wahananing Manunggal that have meaning literally surrender, open, vehicle / container / tools for, unity / together with having the value 6941.

As for all district Sesanti is Pancasila Kaloka Panduning Nagari, with five basic literal meaning, famous / well-known, the guidelines / guidance, country / region to have a value of 5751.

== Geography ==
The northern part of the regency is lowland, while the southern part is mountainous, with the peak of Mount Slamet (on the border with Tegal and Purbalingga), the highest mountain in Central Java. The Comal River is the largest, emptying into the Java Sea at Ujung Pemalang.

The regency capital is located at the northwest tip of the regency, directly adjacent to the Tegal Regency. The town of Pemalang is on the coastal road between Semarang and Surabaya Jakarta. In addition there is a provincial road that connects Pemalang with Purbalingga. One of the famous tourist attractions is the beach Pemalang thistle.

The regency lies in Central Java province, located on the northern coast of Java. Geographically the regency is located between 109° 17'30" – 109° 40'30" E and 6° 52'30" – 7° 20'11" S.

From Semarang (Central Java provincial capital), this regency is approximately 135 km to the west, or if reached by land vehicles takes approximately 3–4 hours by national road, and approximately 90 minutes by the toll road. The whole regency has an area of 1,115.30 km^{2}, with the following boundaries:

- The north (coast) borders the Java Sea
- Eastern border is with Pekalongan Regency
- Southern border is with Purbalingga Regency
- Bordering on the west side with Tegal regency

Thus the whole regency has a strategic position, both in terms of trade and government.

The regency has a varied topography. The northern part of the regency is a coastal area with an altitude ranging from 1 to 5 metres above sea level. The central part is a fertile lowland with an altitude of 6 to 15 metres above sea level; and the southern highlands and mountains are lush with cool air at an altitude varying from 16 to 925 metres above sea level. The region is crossed by two major rivers – the Waluh River and the Comal River. Most of the region is a fertile watershed.

== Climate ==
Pemalang has a tropical monsoon climate (Am) with moderate to little rainfall from June to October and heavy to very heavy rainfall from November to May.

Climate data for Pemalang
Month	Jan	Feb	Mar	Apr	May	Jun	Jul	Aug	Sep	Oct	Nov	Dec	Year
Mean daily maximum °C (°F)	30.0 (86.0)	30.2 (86.4)	31.0 (87.8)	31.6 (88.9)	31.7 (89.1)	31.7 (89.1)	31.7 (89.1)	31.9 (89.4)	32.5 (90.5)	32.7 (90.9)	32.1 (89.8)	31.2 (88.2)	31.5 (88.8)
Daily mean °C (°F)	26.3 (79.3)	26.4 (79.5)	27.0 (80.6)	27.5 (81.5)	27.4 (81.3)	27.0 (80.6)	26.8 (80.2)	26.7 (80.1)	27.3 (81.1)	27.7 (81.9)	27.6 (81.7)	27.0 (80.6)	27.1 (80.7)
Mean daily minimum °C (°F)	22.7 (72.9)	22.7 (72.9)	23.1 (73.6)	23.4 (74.1)	23.2 (73.8)	22.4 (72.3)	21.9 (71.4)	21.5 (70.7)	22.1 (71.8)	22.7 (72.9)	23.1 (73.6)	22.9 (73.2)	22.6 (72.8)
Average rainfall mm (inches)	466 (18.3)	377 (14.8)	275 (10.8)	145 (5.7)	143 (5.6)	90 (3.5)	78 (3.1)	67 (2.6)	56 (2.2)	87 (3.4)	150 (5.9)	290 (11.4)	2,224 (87.3)
Source: Climate-Data.org

== Administrative districts ==
Pemalang Regency consists of fourteen districts (kecamatan), tabulated below with their areas and their populations at the 2010 Census and the 2020 Census, together with the official estimates as at mid 2025. The districts are further divided into 222 villages (211 rural desa and 11 urban kelurahan). The administrative centre of government is in the Pemalang District. In addition to Pemalang, other significant district towns are Comal, Petarukan, Ulujami, Randudongkal and Moga.

In broad terms, the population can be described in three geographical areas. In the three coastal districts in the northwest of the regency (Pemalang, Taman and Petarukan) spread over 250.63 km^{2} there were 593,247 inhabitants (38% of the regency's population) as at mid 2025, with Pemalang and Taman Districts forming a single urban area (kawasan perkotaan) with 412,898 inhabitants. In the four northeastern districts (Ampeldaging, Cornal, Ulujami and Bodeh) with an area of 226.37 km^{2} there were 362,174 inhabitants (23%) in mid 2025. In the remaining eight more rural districts in the centre and south of the regency, covering 638.30 km^{2}, there were 603,805 inhabitants (39%) in mid 2025.

Ministry of Home Affairs code (Kode Wilayah)	Name of District (kecamatan)	Area in km^{2}	Pop'n Census 2010	Pop'n Census 2020	Pop'n Estimate mid 2025	No. of Urban villages (kelurahan)	No. of Rural villages (desa)	Status	List of villages
33.27.01	Moga	41.40	62,432	72,816	77,139		10	Rural Villages	Banyumudal; Gendowang; Kebanggan; Mandiraja; Moga; Pepedan; Plakaran; Sima; Walangsanga; Banyumudal
33.27.14	Warungpring	26.31	37,874	43,785	46,186		6	Rural Villages	Cibuyur; Datar; Karangdawa; Mereng; Pakembaran; Warungpring
33.27.02	Pulosari	87.52	54,301	61,773	64,655		12	Rural Villages	Batursari; Cikendung; Clekatakan; Gambuhan; Gunungsari; Jurangmangu; Karangsari; Nyalembeng; Pagenteran; Penakir; Pulosari; Siremeng
33.27.03	Belik	124.54	102,374	118,638	125,291		12	Rural Villages	Badak; Belik; Beluk; Bulakan; Gombong; Gunungjaya; Gunungtiga; Kalisaleh; Kuta; Mendelem; Sikasur; Simpur
33.27.04	Watukumpul	129.02	63,578	75,891	81,303		15	Rural Villages	Bodas; Bongas; Cawet; Cikadu; Gapura; Jojogan; Majakerta; Majalangu; Medayu; Pagelaran; Tambi; Tlagasana; Tundagan; Watukumpul; Wisnu
33.27.05	Bodeh	85.98	53,017	62,096	65,916		19	Rural Villages	Babakan; Bodeh; Cangak; Gunungbatu; Jatingarang; Jatiroyom; Jraganan; Karangbrai; Kebandaran; Kebandungan; Kelangdepok; Kesesirejo; Kwasen; Longkeyang; Muncang; Parunggalih; Pasir; Payung; Pendowo
33.27.06	Bantarbolang	139.19	69,889	85,145	92,122		17	Rural Villages	Banjarsari; Bantarbolang; Glandang; Karanganyar; Kebon Gede; Kuta; Lenggerong; Pabuaran; Paguyangan; Pedagung; Pegiringan; Purana; Sambeng; Sarwodadi; Sumurkidang; Suru; Wanarata
33.27.07	Randudongkal	90.32	94,666	110,553	117,189		18	Rural Villages	Banjaranyar; Gembyang; Gongseng; Kalimas; Kalitorong; Karangmoncol; Kecepit; Kejene; Kreyo; Lodaya; Mangli; Mejagong; Penusupan; Randudongkal; Rembul; Semaya; Semingkir; Tanahbaya
33.27.08	Pemalang	101.93	172,907	200,868	212,386	7	13	Rural Villages	Banjarmulya; Bojongnangka; Danasari; Kramat; Lawangrejo; Mengori; Pagongsoran; Saradan; Sewaka; Sungapan; Surajaya; Tambakrejo; Wanamulya
33.27.08	Pemalang	101.93	172,907	200,868	212,386	7	13	Urban villages	Bojongbata; Kebondalem; Mulyoharjo; Paduraksa; Pelutan; Sugihwaras; Widuri
33.27.09	Taman	67.41	157,570	187,459	200,502	2	19	Rural Villages	Asemdoyong; Banjaran; Banjardawa; Cibelok; Gondang; Jebed Selatan; Jebed Utara; Jrakah; Kabunan; Kaligelang; Kedungbanjar; Kejambon; Pedurungan; Pener; Penggarit; Sitemu; Sokawangi; Taman; Wanarejan Utara
33.27.09	Taman	67.41	157,570	187,459	200,502	2	19	Urban villages	Beji; Wanarejan Selatan
33.27.10	Petarukan	81.29	143,412	169,272	180,359	1	19	Rural Villages	Bulu; Iser; Kalirandu; Karangasem; Kendaldoyong; Kendalrejo; Kendalsari; Klareyan; Loning; Nyamplung Sari; Panjunan; Pegundan; Pesucen; Petanjungan; Serang; Sirangkang; Tegalmlati; Temuireng; Widodaren
33.27.10	Petarukan	81.29	143,412	169,272	180,359	1	19	Urban village	Petarukan
33.27.11	Ampelgading	53.30	64,589	74,701	78,814		16	Rural Villages	Ampelgading; Banglarangan; Blimbing; Cibiyuk; Jatirejo; Karangtalok; Karangtengah; Kebagusan; Kemuning; Losari; Sidokare; Sokawati; Tegalsari Barat; Tegalsari Timur; Ujunggede; Wonogiri
33.27.12	Comal	26.54	86,467	94,540	97,070	1	17	Rural Villages	Ambokulon; Gandu; Gedeg; Gintung; Kandang; Kauman; Kebojongan; Klegen; Lowa; Pecangakan; Purwosari; Sarwodadi; Sidorejo; Sikayu; Susukan; Tumbal; Wonokromo
33.27.12	Comal	26.54	86,467	94,540	97,070	1	17	Urban village	Purwoharjo
33.27.13	Ulujami	60.55	98,277	113,952	120,374		18	Rural Villages	Ambowetan; Blendung; Botekan; Bumirejo; Kaliprau; Kertosari; Ketapang; Limbangan; Mojo; Padek; Pagergunung; Pamutih; Pesantren; Rowosari; Samong; Sukorejo; Tasikrejo; Wiyorowetan
	TOTAL	1,115.30	1,261,353	1,471,489	1,559,306	11	211		

Of the seven urban villages (kelurahan) in Pemalang District, the populations as at 2024 were: Pelutan 26,834; Mulyoharjo 25,848; Kebondalem 19,874; Sugihwaras 18,672; Bojongbata 16,710; Widuri 8,276; Paduraksa 7,340. Of the two urban villages in Taman District, the populations as at 2024 were: Beji 14,054 and Wanarejan Selatan 10,959; however the most populous desa were Asemdoyong with 19,053, Taman with 18,538, Pedurungan 13,745, Kabunan with 12,686 and Wanarejan Utara with 11,741. Of the regency's other two kelurahan, Petarukan had 21,574 people and Purwoharjo (in Comal District) had 11,463 people.

All districts are mostly Javanese-speaking. In the west and south, inhabitants speak the Javanese dialects of Tegal and Banyumasan, while in the east (Petarukan, Comal, Ulujami, Ampelgading and Bodeh) they use the Javanese dialect of Pekalongan. In this regency there are also have many tribal people in the vicinity of Mount Slamet.

== Government ==
The following is a list of the Pemalang Regents from 1862 onwards.

No	Name	Start Position	End of Office	vice-regent	Information
1	R.A. Soemonegoro		1862		
2	R.T. Reksonegoro	15 March 1862	June 1879		
3	R.T. Soero-adikoesoemo	21 June 1879	24 March 1897		
4	R.T.A. Soeraningrat	7 April 1897	21 January 1907		
5	R.M.A. Pandji Ariodinoto	8 March 1908	24 January 1920		Moved to Cirebon Regents
6	R.A.A. Soedoro Soero-adikoesoemo	18 January 1921	6 October 1940		
7	R.T.A. Rahardjo Soero-adikoesoemo	10 September 1941	October 1945		Arrested and detained in Three Region Incident
Indonesian Government Period
8	R. Soepangat	20 October 1945			
9	K.H. Makmur	30 December 1945			
10	Soewarno	1947	1948		
11	Mochtar	1 December 1949	1954		
12	R.M. Soemardi	1954	1956		
13	K. Machali	1957	1958		
14	R.M. Soemartojo	1959	1966		
15	Drs. Rivai Yusuf	1967	1972		
16	Drs. Soedarmo	1973	1975		
17	Yoesoef Achmadi	1975	1981		
18	Slamet Haryanto, BA	1981	1991		
19	Drs. Soewartono	1991	1996		
20	Drs. H. Munir	1996	2000		
21	H.M. Machroes, SH	2000	2010	H. Junaedi, SH, MH (2006–2011)	
22	H. Junaedi, SH, MH	2011	2016	Mukti Agung Wibowo, S.T., M.Si.	
23	Budhi Rahardjo	2016	2016		Appointed by the regent of Pemalang
24	H. Junaedi, SH, MH	2016	2021	Drs. Martono	
25	Mukti Agung Wibowo, ST, M.si	2021	2023 Non-active since 2022	Mansur Hidayat, ST	Detained by KPK in 2022 and later arrested for a corruption case in 2023. Vice regent took the role of acting regent since 2022.
26	Mansur Hidayat, ST	2023	2024		Acting regent of Pemalang since 2022. Appointed as the regent of Pemalang in 2023.
27	Agung Hariyadi	2024	present		Former head of The Department of Youth and Tourism of Central Java. Appointed as acting regent of Pemalang as the incumbent regent is competing in local election.

== Household industry ==
- Sapu Glagah Majalangu (Sweep glagah of Majalangu)
- Kerajinan Kulit Ular Comal (Leather snake in Comal)
- Batik Lurik di Wanarejan (Lurik in Wanarejan)
- Konveksi di Ulujami (Convection in Ulujami)
- Bagregan Asli Kubang

== Industry ==
Just to the south of Pemalang, there is one large sugar mill named Sumberharjo sugar mill. Although not a popular tourist destination, the mill have many historical significance which regularly attract railfans from Britain or Europe: it is the last place where we can see Du Croo & Brauns steam locomotives in working order, it is also the last sugarcane in Central Java who still operates its field lines (as in 2014 harvesting season), and one of only two sugar mills in Java who regularly deployed their steam locomotives into the field lines (the other being Olean sugar mill in Situbondo, East Java).

== Special food ==
- Nasi Grombyang (Grombyang Rice)

One of Pemalang typical foods is Grombyang rice. The name of this food is quite unique. It is called Grombyang rice because the portion of the dressing is more than the rice and its side dishes so that when it is served in a small bowl it sounds grombyang-grombyang or wobbling like going to spill. When serving, the food consists of rice, slices of buffalo meat and soup which is served with buffalo satay in a small bowl.

- Lontong Dekem (Dekem rice cake)

Dekem rice cake concoction consisted of sliced rice cake, coconut milk yellow curry like, and sprinkled with coconut serundeng. [1] Lontong dekem usually served with satay.

- Sate Loso (Loso Satay)

Loso satay, signature dish from Pemalang, which is served with beef and spicy peanut sauce as its topping

- Sauto atau Soto Tauto (kind of soup)

Coto Tauto with fermented soybeans and buffalo meat

- Kue Kamir (Kamir Cake)

It is the traditional cake of Pemalang, Central Java. Kamir made of rice and wheat floor. The wheat Kamir made of mixed wheat floor, margarine, yeast, and sugar. However, the dough should be let overnight to have a perfect dough. While the rice Kamir is made of mixed rice floor, coconut milk, yeast, and sugar.

- Apem Comal, snacks (cake) is made from rice flour and brown sugar. This food is quite legendary in Pemalang – pekalongan border, this food is produced in the hamlet village of Bantul kesesi pekalongan but because of marketing since time immemorial spread to cities Comal then many who call the Comal apem.

== Famous people ==
- Hendra Setiawan, Badminton gold medalist at the 2008 Beijing Olympics with Markis Kido.
- Muammar Z.A., quran reciter and international hafiz.
- Sutanto, the 18th Chief of Chief of the Indonesian National Police and former Head of Indonesian State Intelligence Agency.
