= List of administrative regencies and administrative cities in Jakarta =

This is a list of regency and cities in Special Capital Region of Jakarta. As of October 2019, there were 1 administrative regency and 5 administrative cities.

#	Administrative regency/ Administrative city	Government	Regent/ Mayor	Area (km^{2})	Population (2019)	District	Kelurahan (urban village)/ Desa (village)	Logo	Location map
1	Thousand Islands Regency	Pramuka Island	Muhammad Fadjar Churniawan	8.70	28,289	2	6/-	pus	pus
2	West Jakarta	Kembangan	Uus Kuswanto	129.54	2,485,224	8	56/-	pus	pus
3	Central Jakarta	Menteng	Dhany Sukma	48.13	1,145,569	8	44/-	pus	pus
4	South Jakarta	Kebayoran Baru	Syafrin Liputo	141.27	2,294,779	10	65/-	pus	pus
5	East Jakarta	Cakung	Munjirin	188.03	3,111,563	10	65/-	pus	pus
6	North Jakarta	Koja	Hendra Hidayat	146.66	1,780,721	6	31/-	pus	pus
