= List of incumbent regional heads and deputy regional heads in Jakarta =

This article lists the current Regional Heads and Deputy Regional Heads of 6 regencies/cities in Jakarta.

== List ==
Regency/ City	Photo of the Regent/ Mayor	Regent/ Mayor	Photo of Deputy Regent/ Mayor	Deputy Regent/ Mayor	Taking Office	End of Office (Planned)	Ref.
Thousand Islands; Administrative Regency List of Regents/Deputy Regents		Muhammad Fadjar Churniawan		Aceng Zaeni	7 May 2025	Adjusting to the Decree of the Governor of Jakarta	
West Jakarta; Administrative City List of Mayors/Deputy mayors		Iin Mutmainnah		Yuli Hartono	Mayor : 17 December 2025; Deputy Mayor : 7 May 2025	Adjusting to the Decree of the Governor of Jakarta	
Central Jakarta; Administrative City List of Mayors/Deputy mayors	pus	Arifin	pus	Eric Phahlevi Zakaria Lumbun	Mayor : 28 November 2024; Deputy Mayor : 7 May 2025	Adjusting to the Decree of the Governor of Jakarta	
South Jakarta; Administrative City List of Mayors/Deputy mayors		M. Anwar		Ali Murthadho	7 May 2025	Adjusting to the Decree of the Governor of Jakarta	
East Jakarta; Administrative City List of Mayors/Deputy mayors		Munjirin		Kusmanto	7 May 2025	Adjusting to the Decree of the Governor of Jakarta	
North Jakarta; Administrative City List of Mayors/Deputy mayors		Hendra Hidayat		Fredy Setiawan	Mayor : 7 May 2025; Deputy Mayor : 17 December 2025	Adjusting to the Decree of the Governor of Jakarta	

== See also ==
- Jakarta
