= Orang Pulo language =

Malay-based creole spoken in the Thousand Islands

Orang Pulo
- Thousand Islands Malay
- Logat Orang Pulo
- Native to: Indonesia
- Region: Thousand Islands, Jakarta
- Ethnicity: Orang Pulo
- Native speakers: 29,417 (2021 (Note: The number of Orang Pulo speakers is adjusted to the population of the Thousands Islands Regency in 2021.))
- Language family: Malay-based creole: Betawi; Orang Pulo
- Dialects: North (Sebira); Central (Panggang, Pramuka, Kelapa-Harapan); South (Tidung, Untung Jawa)
- Writing system: Latin

Language codes
- ISO 639-3: –
- Glottolog: None

The Orang Pulo language (Logat Orang Pulo), alternatively known as Melayu Campuran (Mixed Malay) or Melayu Kepulauan Seribu (Thousand Islands Malay), is a Malay-based creole spoken by the Orang Pulo (lit. 'People of Island') inhabiting the Thousand Islands off the coast of Jakarta, Indonesia. This language emerged from a mixture of many languages in Indonesia, particularly Buginese and Malay.

== History ==
The population of the Thousand Islands is believed to have originated and begun from Panggang Island. As settlements in the Thousand Islands expanded, the spread of the population and its culture continued from one island to another, such as Pari, Untung Jawa, Tidung, and several other islands.

The culture and characteristics of the inhabitants of Panggang Island at that time were very different from those of the Betawi people, despite their proximity to the urban area of Jakarta. They also did not share similarities with the Bantenese, even though some of the early inhabitants originated from Banten. The people of Panggang Island exhibited unique tendencies, characteristics, and culture. Their culture was a blend of Bantenese culture, Kalimantan culture (particularly the Tidung and Banjar), Mandar and Buginese culture from Sulawesi, Sundanese culture, and a bit of Betawi culture and character. This complex mixture resulted in a new culture and characteristics. The Orang Pulo, the original inhabitants of Panggang Island, subsequently shaped the culture and characteristics of the population of the Thousand Islands.

The blend of cultures that created the unique characteristics and culture in the Thousand Islands can also be seen in their language style, gestures, and way of thinking. Their speech is more robust and loud, similar to that of people from Sulawesi, lively and agile like the typical Bantenese, along with other tribal characteristics from Indonesia. This distinctiveness extends to the naming of traditional Orang Pulo cuisine, which has its own unique language style. For example, a dish similar to lontong or nasi uduk is called selingkuh, and fresh sambal for grilled fish is referred to as sambal beranyut.

== Current condition ==
According to research conducted by students from the Indonesian Language and Literature Study Program at HKBP Nommensen University in 2023, Orang Pulo language is beginning to be endangered and is experiencing a shift due to the influx of newcomers who use standard Indonesian. As a result, many local residents there are also switching to using standard Indonesian. This is also supported by the use of foreign languages, especially English, which is considered important by the community because the Thousand Islands is a tourist area. Most of the local community in the Thousand Islands are multilingual or able to speak and understand two or more languages.

== Pronunciation ==
The people of the Thousand Islands have a slightly unique speaking style. Their accent sounds different from the accent commonly spoken by Jakarta residents in the urban areas. Although there are many similarities overall, this accent is clearly distinct from the popular Jakarta accent used in television broadcasts. The speech tone of people from Pramuka Island sounds more 'ups and downs', and the vocabulary they use can sometimes be difficult for outsiders to understand.

The term "Orang Pulo" is commonly used for people originating from Panggang Island, Pramuka Island, and Karya Island. However, generally, this term can also be used for the residents of the Thousand Islands in general, distinguishing them from the term "Orang Daratan" (people who live on the mainland of Jakarta). Panggang Island has also been mentioned as the earliest inhabited island in the Thousand Islands. Nowadays, this island is densely populated. The first generation inhabitants of this island are known to have originated from Bantenese and the Mandar ethnic group.

In the book Orang Pulo di Pulau Karang by Rosida Erowati Irsyad, the Orang Pulo use the Indonesian language with a Malay accent. The Orang Pulo are said to have strong articulation of voice, as well as a distinctive language structure and vocabulary. There are four language styles used by its speakers, namely the style from Kelapa Island (near Harapan Island) which is characterized by long and undulating vowel pronunciation, the style from Tidung Island influenced by the Tidung language and the Tangerang coast (especially the Tangerang Sundanese), then the style from Untung Jawa Island which still retains a strong Betawi accent, and the language style of the Pulo people (namely the people of Panggang Island, Pramuka Island, and Karya Island) which is influenced by the Malay and Bugis languages.

== Vocabulary ==
Here are some distinctive vocabulary terms in the Orang Pulo language, as found in the book Orang Pulo di Pulau Karang:

- atret 'to move backward'
- potret 'to move forward'
- pangkeng 'room'
- monro 'rest'
- godot 'to sew thread'

These terms are unique to the Orang Pulo language and are not found in other languages. There are also words that are similar to those used in other languages, but have different meanings. For example, pengentotan which means 'unpaid debts', or mbok which means 'older sister', and trade (not 'trade' in English) which means 'none'.

Furthermore, there is also a characteristic feature of glottal stop. The glottal stop style is generally known as a characteristic of the Cockney English accent, but it is also present in the Orang Pulo language. Glottal stop is a way of pronouncing the dead sound [t] with the throat closed. Not only the dead sound [t], but also the dead sound [k].

Here are some examples of glottal stop in the Orang Pulo language:

- laut 'sea' becomes lau
- kunyit 'turmeric' becomes kunyi
- belok 'turn' becomes blengko
- barat 'west' becomes bara

Additionally, there are changes in words from Indonesian to the Orang Pulo language, such as mau 'want' becoming 'mao', timur 'east' becoming timor, and pohon 'tree' becoming pokok, tidur 'sleep' becoming tidor.

== Dialects ==
The language of the people of the Thousand Islands has significant differences from the language of the Betawi people on the mainland of Jakarta. However, not all of these differences apply to some islands in the Thousand Islands. For example, Pramuka Island has a more unique and distinct dialect compared to the dialect of the Orang Pulo in general. The differences in dialect among the communities of the Thousand Islands are very apparent in their vocabulary and dialect. Here is a list of dialects in the Orang Pulo language:

- Orang Pulo
  - Northern
    - Sebira (spoken in Sebira Island and the northern part of the Thousand Islands)
  - Central
    - Panggang (spoken in Panggang Island and the central part of the Thousand Islands)
    - Pramuka (spoken in Pramuka Island)
    - Kelapa-Harapan (spoken in Kelapa Island and Harapan Island)
  - Southern
    - Tidung (spoken in Tidung Island)
    - Untung Jawa (spoken in Untung Jawa Island and the southern part of the Thousand Islands)

== See also ==
- Thousand Islands Regency
- Malay trade and creole languages
- Betawi language
