= Lestari =

Lestari is an Indonesian surname. Notable people with the surname include:

- Bunga Citra Lestari (born 1983), Indonesian singer, actress, talent show judge, and television personality
- Dewi Lestari (born 1976), Indonesian writer, singer, and songwriter
- Mardi Lestari (born 1968), retired Indonesian athlete
- Nisak Puji Lestari (born 1997), Indonesian badminton player
- Swietenia Puspa Lestari (born 1994), Indonesian underwater diver, environmental engineer and environmental activist
