= Zahro Express disaster =

2017 ferry disaster in Indonesia

MV Zahro Express disaster
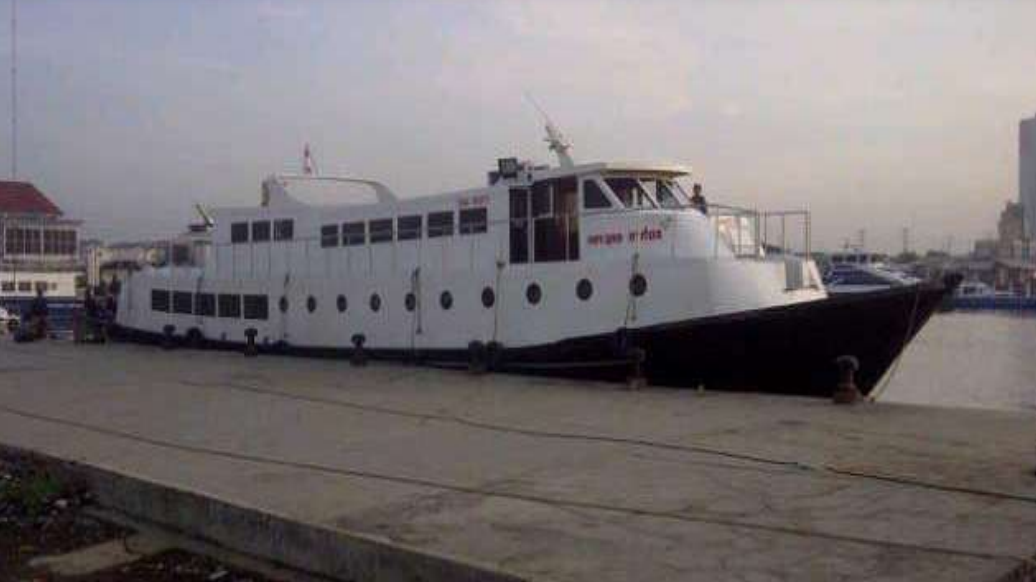
- MV Zahro Express
- Date: 1 January 2017; 9 years ago
- Time: Around 08:30 to 10:24 a.m WIB
- Location: 5.6 kilometres (3.5 mi) off Muara Angke, Jakarta, Indonesia.; 6°3′11.4″N 106°46′37.14″E
- Cause: Uncontained fire on board and crew management failure
- Deaths: 24
- Injuries: 48
- On board: 221
- Survivors: 197

The Zahro Express disaster occurred on the morning of 1 January 2017 when an Indonesian-flagged wooden passenger vessel caught fire in the waters of Thousands Islands Regency, off the coast of Jakarta. She was travelling from Jakarta's Muara Angke to Tidung Island, a popular tourist destination. The ferry, named MV Zahro Express, was carrying 216 passengers and 5 crew members. Of the 221 passengers and crews, a total of 24 people on board lost their lives.

The ferry, bound for Tidung Island, was crowded with tourists when the generator on the main deck produced sparks. The generator overheated and caused a fire that spread through the vessel. The crowded condition, aggravated by the lack of emergency exits, poor crew resource management and lack of evacuation plan, caused a pile-up near the vessel's main access, hampering the evacuation process. The hampered evacuation process caused multiple smoke inhalation and deaths.

The incident was the deadliest ferry disaster in Jakarta since the MV Levina 1 disaster in 2007. Numerous procedural violations were later discovered by the Indonesian police. As such, several officials were summoned and apprehended by the police. The captain was charged for negligence due to "manifest discrepancies", while the owner of the ferry was only sent a disciplinary note by the Indonesian Ministry of Transportation.

== Ship information ==
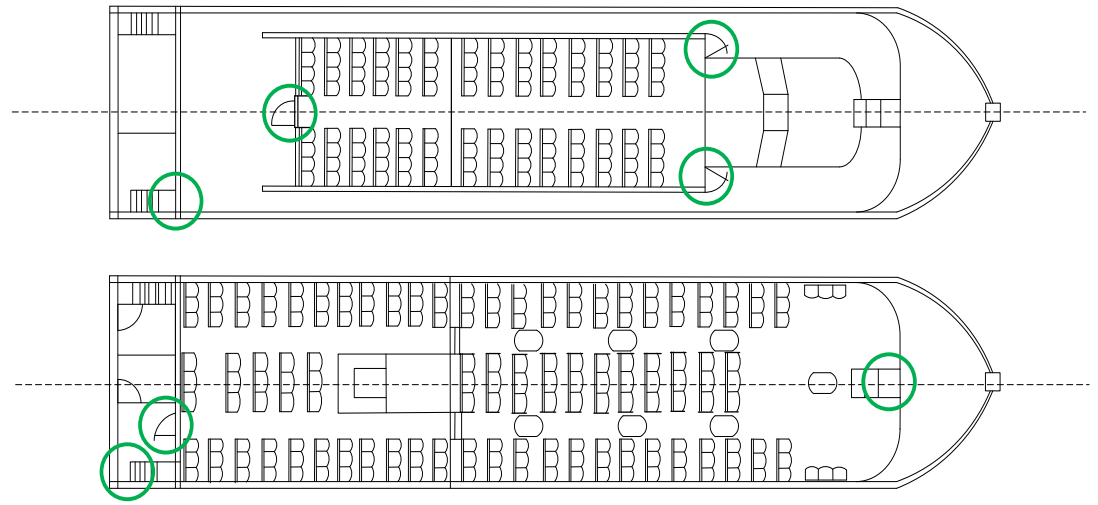
A diagram of the ferry's layout. Green circles indicate the ferry's main access.

MV Zahro Express was a privately owned, traditionally made wooden passenger ferry built in Thousands Islands Regency in 2013. It was conventionally built by local shipbuilders. The designing and production phase was solely based on the shipbuilders’ expertise and was not based on rules that were supposed to be followed by local shipbuilder. The vessel was designed to carry a total of 285 passengers and 5 crew members. There were 2 decks in the vessel, the main deck and the upper deck, with the bridge located at the front of the upper deck. Both decks were connected with stairs located at the back and at the front of the vessel. The engine compartment was located at the lower stern. The main engine, genset, fuel tank, and water tank were all located at the engine compartment. The seats on both decks were made from fiber reinforced plastic. The superstructure was made from various industrial woods.

There were four main access in the ferry. The access of the main deck was located at the front and the back, with the bow access had a width of 77 centimetres (30 in). The upper deck had three main access, of which two were located at the bow and one access, connected directly to the main deck, was located at the stern. The bow access of the main deck and two access of the upper deck would eventually lead the passengers to the forecastle deck.

The vessel was not equipped with an evacuation route, nor was it classified onto the government's classification board.

== Event ==
=== Prior to disaster ===
Passengers began to board MV Zahro Express as early as 05:00 a.m local time. The crew members then asked permission from local authorities to depart from Muara Angke and was later granted. The manifest, which was given by the crew to the authorities, listed a total of 100 passengers and 5 crew members on board the ferry. The actual number of passengers on board, however, were over 200 people.

At 07:30 a.m, the chief engineer of the ferry turned on the main engine of the ferry. He realized that smoker was coming out from the engine compartment. As he headed towards the engine compartment, he turned on the outlet fans and discovered that the smoke was produced from a leaking exhaust pipe of the ferry's generator. The chief engineer then solved the problem by covering the leaking pipe with an asbestos cloth.

MV Zahro Express departed from Muara Angke at 08:15 a.m, with a speed of 10 knots (19 km/h; 12 mph) and a destination to Tidung Island. The visibility was excellent and the weather was in very good condition.

=== Disaster ===
The ferry had just departed from Muara Angke for 15 minutes when crew members noticed that there were smoke coming out from the lower left engine compartment, which was located around an electric generator. The crew members then went to the engine compartment to check on the source of the smoke. The crew then realized that flames had developed around the generator. The Chief Engineer then reported to the Captain the situation. The engine was stopped and an evacuation order was announced.

Chaos immediately engulfed the entire ferry as the smoke thickened, with screaming and crying could be heard. Passengers on the main deck recalled that visibility deteriorated sharply with the main deck being described as pitch black. Crew members couldn't contain the crowd as panicking passengers rushed to the exit. As the fire was located at the stern, most of the passengers in the main deck opted to evacuate through the deck's bow access. Passengers in the upper deck, who noticed that smoke was coming out from the stern, immediately ran to the two main access located at the bow. The main deck and the upper deck bow access would eventually lead the passengers to the forecastle deck. Passengers from the upper deck then poured onto the forecastle deck, many of whom hesitated to jump onto the sea. This caused a pile-up at both decks, far worse in the main deck. Survivors recalled that the fire was very quick and that some explosions were heard. As crew members were busy at saving themselves, the fire wasn't contained and grew larger. Many passengers didn't don life jackets and immediately jumped onto the sea.

The rescue operation was swift as there was heavy traffic in the area. Due to the proximity of MV Zahro Express with nearby vessels, many passengers were immediately rescued. As passengers were rescued, the fire intensified and spread to the upper deck. Five minutes after the fire had just started at the lower deck, MV Zahro Express was completely engulfed in flames.

== Recovery ==
Immediately after the fire was extinguished, rescue personnel towed the burnt wreckage of MV Zahro Express to Muara Angke. She arrived at Muara Angke on 12:30 pm. Search and rescue personnel then immediately began their work to recover any remains on the vessel. A total of 20 charred bodies were immediately recovered from the vessel. Rescue personnel also recovered four bodies from the sea, bringing the death toll to 24. There were multiple reports that 17 passengers were still missing. As such, rescue personnel deployed divers and more equipment to the area where the ferry had caught fire.

The search and rescue efforts were conducted from 1 to 8 January. The Indonesian National Search and Rescue Agency (BASARNAS) searched a total of 151 square miles (390 km^{2}) of the sea to search for any survivors or remains. Thousands of personnel, including 5 ships and 15 divers, were involved in the operation. As no human remains were recovered from the sea, BASARNAS concluded the search and rescue operation on 8 January.

== Casualties ==
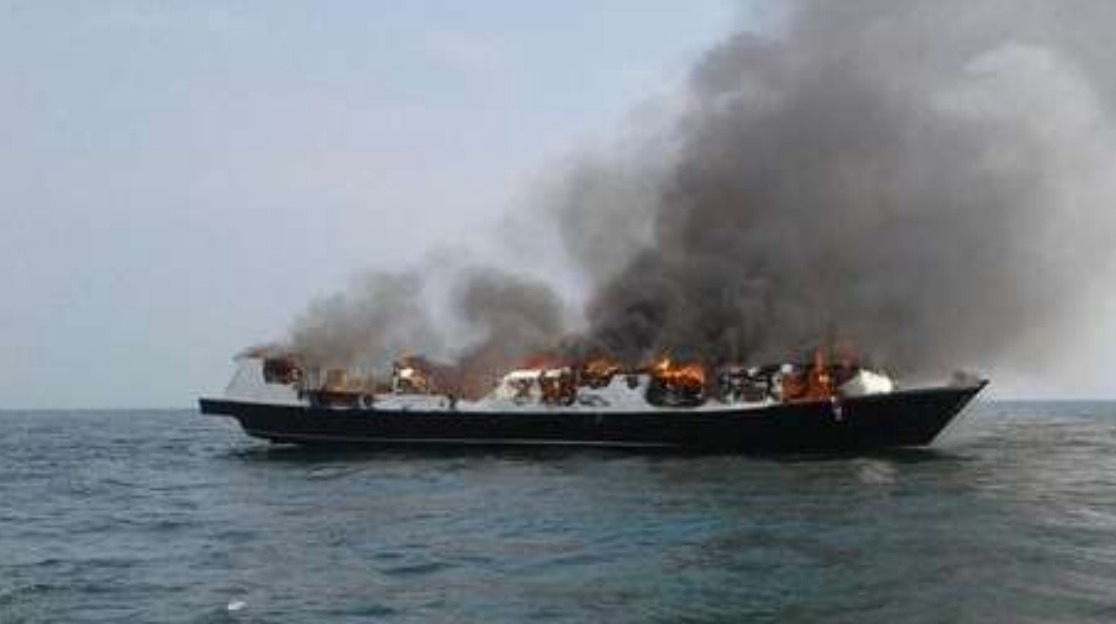
The burning wreckage of MV Zahro Express (taken from NTSC report)

As the disaster happened on holiday season, most of the passengers were sightseers who were travelling to Tidung Island for vacation. The route was popular among tourists and was frequently used by travel agencies. According to NTSC, the vessel operating the route, MV Zahro Express, was carrying 216 passengers and 5 crew members. (Note: According to the final report, NTSC could not confirm the exact number of passengers and crew members on board.) Initially, there were some discrepancies on the exact number of the passengers and crew members on the vessel, as the captain admitted that the crew members didn't count the number of passengers on board. The passenger manifest stated that there were at least 100 passengers on board. In reality, however, there were more than 200 people. The discrepancies on the number of passengers and crew members hampered the search and rescue effort.

The Indonesian National Board for Disaster Management (BNPB) stated that at least 20 bodies have been found inside the vessel, 4 bodies were recovered from the sea and 17 other passengers were still missing. Officials reported that the missing passengers might have been included in the recovered bodies. Later on, the final tally of the number of victims were 24 deaths and it was revealed that there was no missing passenger. A total of 48 wounded passengers were hospitalized. All of the victims were passengers and no crew members were killed in the incident. By 6 January, all 24 victims have been identified by the police.

== Investigation ==
=== Cause of fire ===
The fire was caused by an overheated generator in the vessel's engine compartment. This was based on eyewitnesses accounts and findings on the burnt generator. An examination on the generator revealed that there were traces of burns on the stator exciter of the generator. Several parts of the stator were found to be a lot darker than the other, suggesting that a generator overheat might have happened. The overheating might have been caused by a short circuit between the stator and the rotor. The rotor, which was not supposed to scrape the stator, had shifted from its initial position due to damage on its bearing. There were also traces of electric sparks on the two electrodes of the generator.

=== Environmental factors ===
Investigation found several contributing factors to the severity of the fire on board the ferry, including the ferry's wooden material, the seating material, and numerous design flaws on the engine compartment and the ferry's superstructure. The fire spread rapidly throughout the ferry's main deck and upper deck.

The engine compartment was consisted of a water tank, a generator, a genset and fuel lines located over the generator. A wooden bearing was placed inside, acting as a seawater filter and cooler. To prevent seawater from entering the compartment, a stuffing box was placed at the generator's stern tube. However, some seawater poured through the barrier. The lower portion of the engine compartment then collected it, forming contaminated seawater. During the refueling, some fuel dripped, creating an oily bilge water. The ferry was equipped with a pump to suck remaining seawater in the compartment. However, the distinct density between fuel and seawater caused the remaining fuel to stick and seep into the floors in the engine compartment.

The lack of ventilation inside the engine compartment caused the temperature to rise. This caused some fuel particles to evaporate. An air tube in the compartment, located directly above the fuel tank, further aggravated the condition. The air tube inside the engine compartment would cause evaporating fuel to mix with oxygen, causing a combustible air. As the generator caught fire, an airtight divider should have prevented the fire from spreading out. The divider was not placed properly, thus the fire spread. The fire could also be immediately contained inside the compartment had the crew installed a quick closing valve on the genset. However, it was not installed.

Thick smoke rising from the engine compartment then spread into the main deck, causing the temperature to rise. As the ferry was made from industrial woods, the fire burned rapidly. This was worsened by the fibre-reinforced plastic material of the seats and on the interior of the ferry. The lack of fire-fighting equipment on the ferry caused the fire to grow larger.

=== Evacuation failure ===
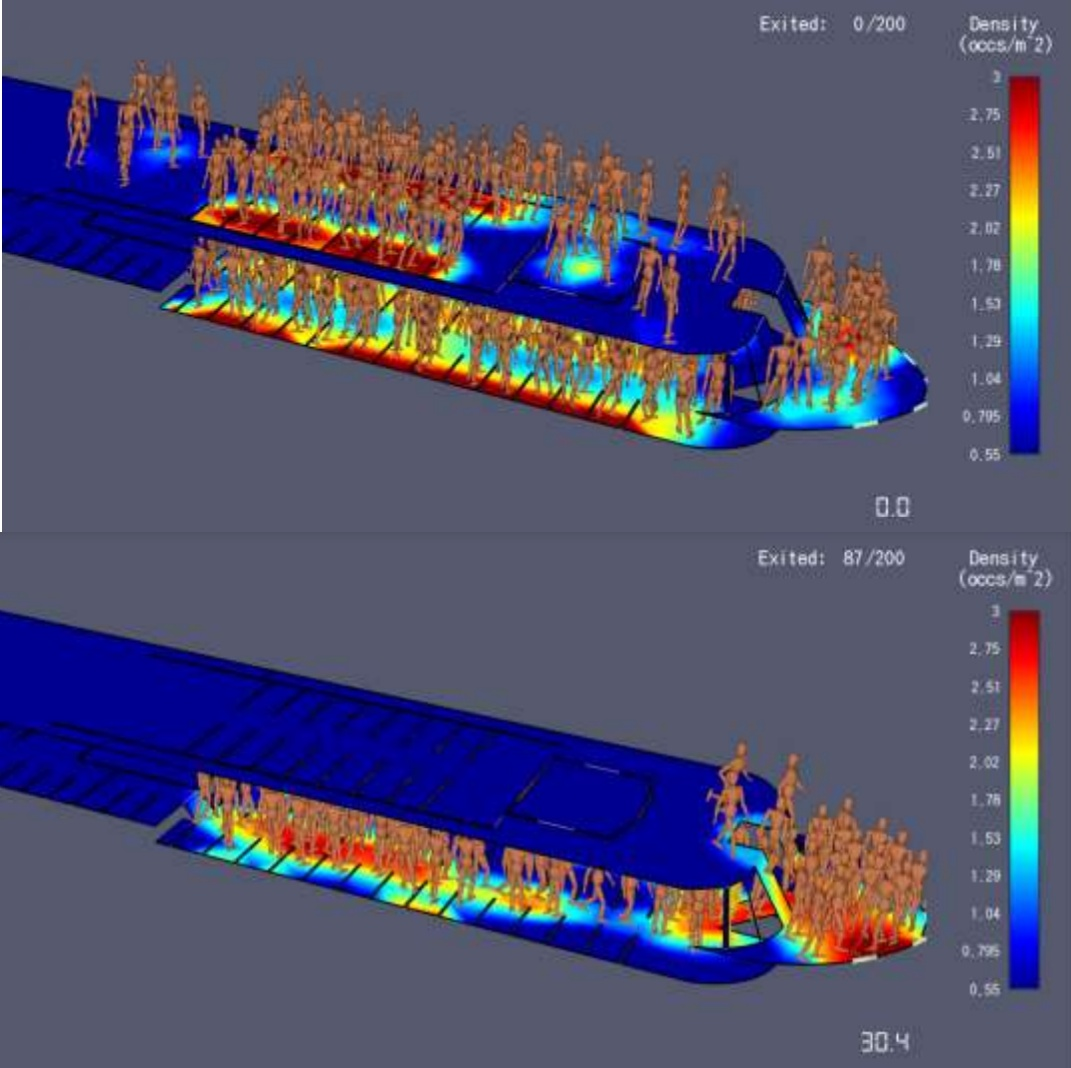
Reconstruction of the evacuation process during the disaster

The fire started at the engine compartment, which was located at the lower stern, directly under the main deck. The engine compartment was connected directly to the main deck. As the generator failed and burst into flames, thick smokes immediately filled the main deck. This immediately caused panic among the passengers in the main deck. NTSC estimated that at the time of the disaster there were around 130 passengers on the main deck. Using pathfinder, investigators reconstructed the evacuation of the passengers during the disaster.

The evacuation started at around 08:35 local time when passengers began to notice that there were thick smokes coming out from the engine compartment. The thickness of the smoke immediately caused panic among the passengers. The engine compartment was located at the back of the main deck and the fire blocked passengers from evacuating through the back door. This caused passengers on the main deck to evacuate through the one and only access at the bow, which had a width of just 77 cm. The narrow access caused a pile-up near the exit.

As passengers on the main deck began to evacuate, passengers on the upper deck also noticed that there were smokes coming out from the main deck. As the smokes came from the back of the deck, the passengers of the upper deck began to evacuate through the deck's two main access on the front. The number of emergency exits on the upper deck made the evacuation of the passengers on the upper deck a lot easier than the main deck. As the bow access of the main deck and the upper deck led the passengers to the forecastle deck, passengers converged on the deck, most were from the upper deck.

Many of the passengers on the forecastle deck didn't jump immediately to the sea, causing a pile-up on both the main deck and the upper deck. Many of the 130 passengers on the main deck, however, had not evacuated from the deck yet. This further worsened the situation as passengers began to scream and push each other. The thick smoke then spread to the entire main deck, causing deterioration on the visibility and causing smoke inhalation injuries.

The Captain of MV Zahro Express claimed that he had ordered his crews to extinguish the flames. However, many of the crews immediately abandoned the ferry and didn't contain the panic. The ferry was also not equipped with an evacuation plan, evacuation route, fire control plan or printed safety and emergency procedure.

=== Poor training and management failure ===
Heavy criticisms were launched at the surviving crew members of MV Zahro Express. One survivor reported that one of the crew members of the vessel, who noticed smokes coming from the generator and was supposed to help the passengers to evacuate, immediately evacuated himself and didn't appropriately handle the crisis. The captain of the vessel immediately abandoned the burning ferry as flames began to develop in the main deck. Panicking passengers were left to handle the crisis all by themselves.

NTSC investigation revealed that the crews didn't hold any kind of applicable certificates for operating a passenger vessel, not even a competency certificate. All 5 crew members also didn't hold any basic safety training certificates. The crews were never trained on handling a fire emergency. Local authorities in Muara Angke claimed that they weren't informed on the ferry's departure and claimed that the ferry was an "Illegal vessel", though this claim was later refuted by NTSC.

== Response ==
The disaster shocked the public and highlighted Indonesia's poor transportation safety record. It exposed poor supervision on ferries operation and further exposed safety loopholes. As such, there were calls to improve the safety of public transportation. The disaster drew criticisms from politicians and caused a temporary enforcement of stricter laws on ferry operation in Muara Angke.

As reports of several procedural violations began to emerge, the Indonesian police decided to apprehend several crew members for further questioning, including the local authorities who permitted the ferry to depart from Muara Angke. The port master of Muara Angke was immediately fired by the Indonesian Ministry of Transportation. In response to the disaster, the Indonesian Ministry of Transportation threatened severe sanctions to the Captain and the crew members. Disciplinary note was sent to both the Captain and the owner of the ferry. On 3 January, the Captain of the ferry, M Nali, was named as the suspect in the disaster.

In the immediate aftermath of the disaster, several politicians visited the survivors and urged the local government to enforce stricter laws and supervision on ferries operation. In response, tighter regulations were immediately implemented days after the disaster.

== See also ==
- Sinking of MV Sinar Bangun, a ferry disaster in Lake Toba in 2018 that was caused by overloading and passenger manifest discrepancies
- Tampomas II, one of the deadliest ferry fire in Indonesia
