= MV Laut Teduh 2 =

Indonesian passenger ferry

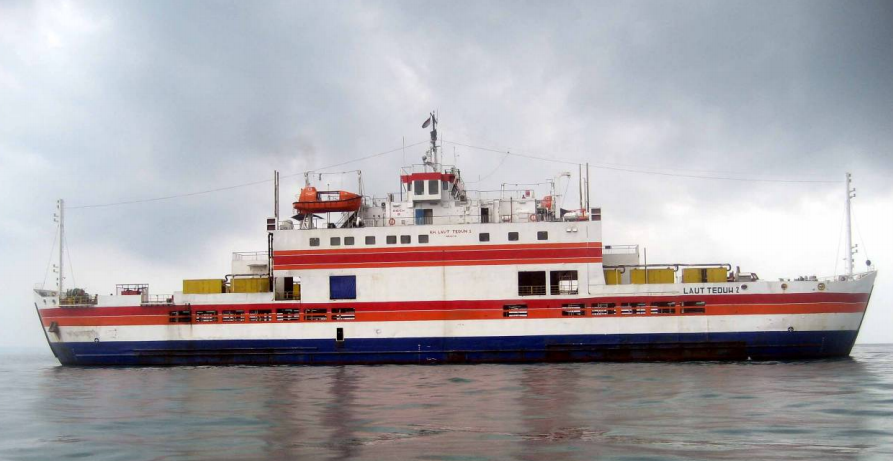
- MV Laut Teduh 2, the ship involved in the disaster

History
- Name: Superflex Whisky (1989 - 1990); Mercandia VII (1990 - 1995); DVD No II (1995 - 97) (1998 - 2007); Yong Lian (1997 - 98); Yong Qian (1998); Laut Teduh 2 (2007 - 2011)
- Owner: Mercandia Linierne I/S (1990 - 95); Dalian Vivid Dragon Shipping Co. (1995 - 2007); PT Bangun Putera Remaja (2007 - 11)
- Port of registry: Copenhagen, Denmark (1990 - 1995); Kingstown, Saint Vincent and the Grenadines (1995 - 2007); Jakarta, Indonesia (2007 - 2011)
- Builder: Ferguson Appledore Shipbuilders Ltd
- Launched: 1 December 1988
- Completed: March 1989
- Acquired: 30 May 1990
- Out of service: 28 January 2011
- Identification: IMO number: 8611611; Call sign OUKY (1990-95); Call sign J8KE9 (1995-2007); Call sign PKSL (2007-11)
- Fate: Caught fire off the coast of Port of Merak, Banten; Scrapped in 2012

General characteristics
- Type: Passenger ferry
- Tonnage: 4,216 GT, 1,424 NT, 1,280 DWT
- Length: 95.8 metres (314 ft 4 in)
- Beam: 15.19 metres (49 ft 10 in)
- Height: 9.87 metres (32 ft 5 in)
- Draught: 3.61 metres (11 ft 10 in)
- Installed power: 10 x Cummins diesel engines model NTA-855G2 2,750 kilowatts (3,690 hp)
- Propulsion: 4 pcs Azimuth rudder propellers
- Speed: 14 knots (26 km/h)
- Capacity: 350 passengers, 170 cars
- Crew: 31

MV Laut Teduh II was an Indonesian-flagged double-ended RO/RO passenger ferry that served the route from the Port of Merak in Java to the Port of Bakauheni in Sumatra, one of the busiest ferry routes in Indonesia. She was built in 1988 in England and was registered as Laut Teduh II in 2007.

In the early hours of 28 January 2011, the Laut Teduh 2 departed Merak with 454 passengers and crews. En route to Bakauheni, a fire broke out on the lower deck. The fire originated from a malfunctioning air conditioner system inside a parked bus. Failure to contain the fire caused it to spread rapidly onto the upper deck. The ferry's electrical system was later destroyed, causing a blackout and hampering the evacuation process. As the fire intensified, the upper deck collapsed onto the lower deck. Several passengers also drowned during the disaster.

At least 27 people were killed, 22 were hospitalized, and more than 240 others were injured. It was one of the deadliest Indonesian ferry fires since MV Levina 1 in 2007. The disaster further highlighted the nation's poor transportation safety record and poor implementation of safety rules.

== Ship information ==
The ship was 95.8 metres (314 ft 4 in) long with a beam of 15.19 metres (49 ft 10 in). Her height was 9.87 metres (32 ft 5 in) tall with a draught of 3.61 metres (11 ft 10 in). She was equipped with 10 Cummins diesel engines and 4 Schottel azimuth rudder propellers which could propel the ship at 24 knots (44 km/h). Ramps were constructed in the bow and stern of the ship.

The ship had a total of four decks. Up to 170 cars or 30 trucks could be accommodated on the first deck, and 30 cars on the second deck. There was room for 350 passengers on the third deck, while crews and control systems were located on the fourth deck.

== History ==
MV Laut Teduh 2 was built in 1988 by Ferguson Appledore Shipbuilders Ltd in Palleon Shipyard, located in Sunderland, Tyne And Wear, North East England. She was named Superflex Whisky from March 1989 to May 1990, until she was bought by Mercandia-Linierne I/S, a partnership comprising Per Søren Henriksen, Rederi & Handelsaktieselskabet Mercandia Enterprise and Mercandia Shipping A/S. She was subsequently registered in Denmark on 30 May and was renamed Mercandia VII.

In 1995, she was sold to Dalian Vivid Dragon Shipping Co. Ltd. and renamed DVD No II. The ship was registered under the Saint Vincent and the Grenadines flag. She served in Haikou, Hainan from 1995 to 1996. Her name was later changed to Yong Lian from 1997 to 1998 and was changed again to Yong Qian in May 1998, before being renamed again as DVD No II. She was later put up for sale in 2007 and was sold to Bangun Putra Remaja, a company located in Tanjung Priok, Jakarta. She was registered in 2008 and later renamed MV Laut Teduh 2. She was assigned to serve the Bakauheni and Merak route.

== Event ==
=== Prior to disaster ===
The ship reached Merak at 02:49 local time. As crews unloaded her cargo, passengers boarded the ship and vehicles were brought onto the two car decks. The passenger manifest indicated a total of 35 passengers with boarding tickets and hundreds of unaccounted passengers. There were a total of 93 vehicles on board the ship.

The ship was set to sail at 03:19. While several drivers had left their vehicles to go upstairs into the passenger deck, numerous drivers and passengers decided to stay in their vehicles as they found this more comfortable. The ship was bound to Bakauheni with an average speed of 6–7 knots (11–13 km/h; 6.9–8.1 mph).

=== Start of fire ===
At 03:50, while the ship was 5 nautical miles (9.3 km; 5.8 mi) from Merak, several people on the lower deck noticed that there were fumes inside the deck. They discovered that these were coming from the inside of a parked bus, at the backside, located in the middle of the deck. Passengers began to shout and warned fellow passengers and drivers who had been sleeping inside their vehicles. In just a few minutes, the lower car deck was engulfed in thick smoke. Panicking drivers were trapped inside the deck as the fire intensified.

The captain was informed about the incident and ordered two workers in the ship's workshop, located directly above the fire, to extinguish the flames. They failed to contain the fire and ordered the passengers to evacuate the burning ferry. The uncontained fire quickly spread to the upper car deck. Crews tried to stop the fire from spreading further, but a large explosion caused them to order everyone to abandon the ship immediately. The captain made emergency calls to Merak.

As the fire reached fuels inside the vehicles on board, multiple large explosions were heard, causing further panic among the passengers. Several passengers jumped onto the sea, and others were thrown out from the vessel as passengers pushed each other. Crew members tried to inflate several rafts and deployed a lifeboat with 30 people on board.

The fire then destroyed the ship's electrical system, causing a blackout. As the fire intensified, it melted the plates and supporting beams of the upper deck, causing it to collapse onto the lower deck. The ship was badly damaged: the rudders were inoperable and the control system destroyed. The ship drifted and finally ran aground at Anyer Beach. By the time of her grounding, the fire had reached the third deck and the bridge.

=== Evacuation ===
Ferries, tugboats and an Indonesian military ship arrived to assist with the rescue operation. At least 11 ferries were deployed to transport passengers from MV Laut Teduh 2 to shore. Tugboats and search-and-rescue personnel combed the area to search for victims and survivors around the ship. The main ramps of the ferry were opened and firefighters tried to cool the ferry down.

The fire was fully extinguished on 2 February. The rescue operation ended when no further bodies were recovered from the gutted ship and the waters around it.

== Casualties ==
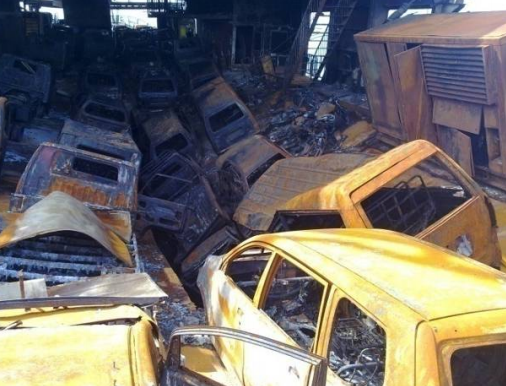
The intense fire caused the plates of the upper deck to melt, causing it to collapse

Officials reported that at least 27 people passengers were killed in the disaster, 14 of them by fire and the other 13 by drowning. 25 bodies were transported to Merak, while 2 were taken to Bakauheni. Three children were reported to be among the victims.

As many as 427 passengers and crews survived the fire. At least 22 people were badly wounded and 241 were slightly injured. A total of 53 people were taken to hospitals for further treatment. Among the passengers were 33 students and staff from the University of Lampung Nusabakti.

The fire destroyed both car decks. The condition of the vehicles on the lower deck was much more severe than those on the upper deck. Several were crushed as the upper deck collapsed due to the intense heat of the fire. Several structures on the ferry had been deformed by the fire. While the third deck and the bridge suffered significant destruction, several parts of the third deck only suffered slight damage. These areas were used by survivors as evacuation points. The wind at the time was blowing to the stern, preventing the fire from spreading to the bow and providing time for passengers to evacuate the ferry.

== Response ==
Vice President Boediono, accompanied by the Minister of Health Endang Rahayu Sedyaningsih, visited the survivors in Krakatau Hospital. He ordered Freddy Numberi, the Minister of Transportation, to revise the standard operating procedures of ferry operations in Indonesia so that it "won't happen again in the future". The Minister of Health gave operational funds of Rp50 million to assist with the evacuation process and support for the injured survivors.

In response to the disaster, the People's Representatives Council issued a statement for the central government to enact administrative sanctions on every ferry operators that did not meet the set of standards. The Council also called for further inspection and observation of ferry operations throughout Indonesia. The government-owned insurance company Jasa Raharja stated that Rp65 million would be paid in compensation to relatives of the victims.

Due to reports that the fire had originated from a bus, two bus drivers were apprehended by the Indonesian police for questioning. Several survivors, crew members and the ship's captain were also questioned. In the aftermath, the Indonesian police stated that they had decided not to charge anyone. However, on 31 January, the regional police of Banten charged the captain, the ship's first mate and a bus driver for negligence. On 5 May, a trial was held by the Indonesian Court of Shipping.

== Investigation ==
=== Cause of the fire ===
Multiple survivors reported that the fire started at the back of a bus parked in the middle of the lower deck. Investigators confirmed this, concluding that the fire originated from a short-circuit in the bus's faulty air conditioning system. The system had been turned on by the bus driver as passengers had decided to stay on the bus and refused to go to the passenger area on the third deck, as they found the bus more comfortable.

=== Progress of the fire ===
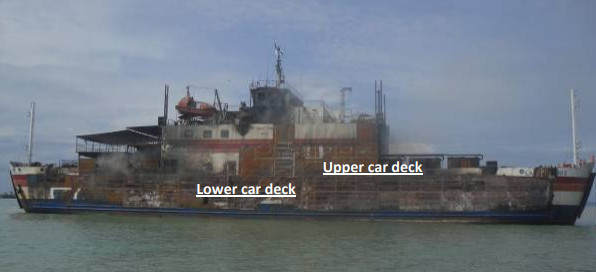
Gutted hulk of MV. Laut Teduh 2 following the fire

Although the initial fire was discovered immediately by the ship's passengers, it was not contained. The fire spread and contacted combustible items including the seats and fuel of the bus, igniting an intense flame. The ship's ventilation system exacerbated the fire by feeding it with oxygen. The ship's steel body conducted heat more efficiently to surrounding objects, causing the fire to spread even more rapidly. People on board had tried to extinguish the flames. However, due to the tightly parked vehicles and poor visibility, containment was difficult and the flames were able to spread quickly.

The fire grew larger as an overhead fuel pipe, located directly above the bus, ignited. As the fire reached the upper deck, its plates melted due to the intense heat, causing the deck to collapse. This enabled the fire to reach the fourth deck. Any remaining fuels inside the vehicles on the upper deck and lower deck then ignited, creating multiple explosions inside the vessel.

The ship was equipped with sprinklers, but for these to operate, the crew members first had to activate water pumps. These were located near the burning bus, so the sprinklers were not activated. Crews had also used dry powders to attempt to control the fire, but the flames were too severe for this to be effective. The ship had a single firefighter outfit with breathing apparatus. The outfit was not worn by any of the crews, as they thought that the fire was already too intense.

=== Crew failure ===
Although the fire eventually spread through the entire ship, investigators stated that it could initially have been contained. Crew members should have immediately extinguished the fire when they found it, but they mismanaged the situation and the fire grew quickly.

Several instances of crew mismanagement contributed to the fire. When passengers stayed in their vehicles rather than going upstairs to the designated passenger deck, the crew should have instructed them to leave immediately. Rules issued by the Ministry of Transportation stated that the crew should also have ordered passengers to detach the cables connecting their vehicles' car batteries.

The first crew member to discover the fire failed to immediately warn his crewmates. When other crew members started to realize there was a fire on board, the lower car deck had already been filled with thick smoke, making fire-fighting efforts difficult. When the captain was informed of the fire, he did not use the PA system to warn the passengers and did not issue any alarm.

As explosions began to rattle the ferry, poor crowd control in the ferry caused the passengers to panic. Some did not put on their life jackets as crew members did not direct them or remind them to do so. There was no contingency plan and the sprinkler system was not activated immediately. Crew members also failed to frequently clean the ship's workshop. As such, oil stains in the workshop caused the fire to grow rapidly.

The safety manual issued by the owner of MV Laut Teduh 2 stated that fire drills should be conducted at least once a month. Interviews with the crew members revealed that no such training had been conducted for at least 2 years before the day of the disaster. The crew members were not disciplined by the owner.

These failures in crew management eventually led to the uncontrollable spread of the fire and the drowning of passengers.

== See also ==
- Zahro Express disaster
