= Junaedi =

Indonesian bureaucrat (1966–2024)

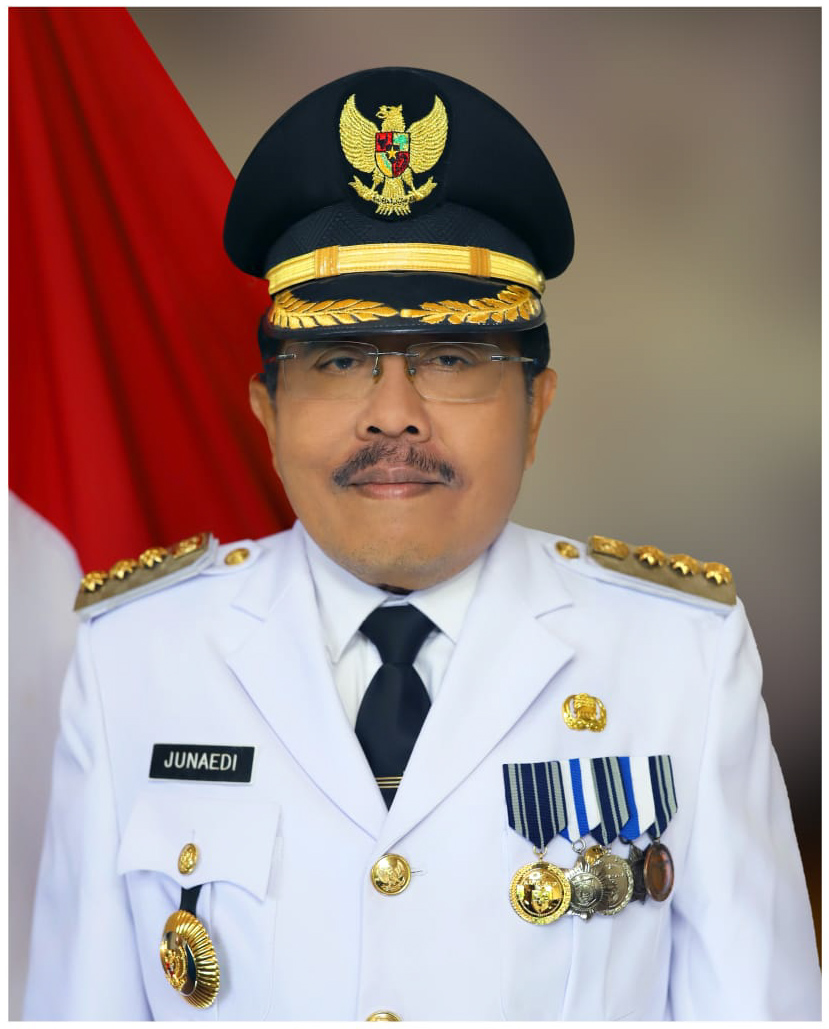
- Junaedi in 2020

11th Regent of Thousand Islands
- In office 27 July 2020 (Note: Acting until 4 September 2020) – 13 November 2024
- Preceded by: Husein Murad
- Succeeded by: Muhammad Fadjar Churniawan

Vice Regent of Thousand Islands
- In office 25 September 2018 – 27 July 2020
- Preceded by: Ismer Harahap
- Succeeded by: Muhammad Fadjar Churniawan

Vice Mayor of North Jakarta
- In office 13 July 2017 – 25 September 2018
- Preceded by: Yani Wahyu Purwoko
- Succeeded by: Ali Maulana Hakim

Personal details
- Born: 5 December 1966 Brebes, East Java, Indonesia
- Died: 13 November 2024 (aged 57) Jakarta, Indonesia

Junaedi (5 December 1966 – 13 November 2024) was an Indonesian bureaucrat who served as the Regent of Thousand Islands from 4 September 2020 until his death on 13 November 2024.

== Biography ==
Junaedi obtained a social studies degree from the Yapan Institute of Administration in 1992 and a master's of science degree from the Padjajaran University in 2005. After his graduation, Junaedi began working for the Jakarta city government. He became the city secretary of North Jakarta in 2015 and the assistant to the deputy governor for environment in 2016.

On 13 July 2017, Junaedi became the Vice Mayor of North Jakarta. He held the office for a year until he was transferred to the Thousand Islands and became the island's vice regent on 25 September 2018. He became the acting regent two years later on 27 July 2020, after the retirement of the island's regent.

Following parliamentary recommendations and approval, Junaedi became the definitive regent of the islands on 4 September 2020.

Junaedi died in Jakarta on 13 November 2024, at the age of 57.
