= Swietenia Puspa Lestari =

Indonesian environmentalist

- Born: 23 December 1994 (age 31); Bogor
- Education: Bandung Institute of Technology
- Occupations: Diver, environmentalist
- Awards: 100 Women (2019); Forbes 30 Under 30 (2020, social entrepreneurs)

Swietenia Puspa Lestari (born 23 December 1994) is an Indonesian underwater diver, environmental engineering graduate, and environmental activist.

== Early life ==
Swietenia Puspa Lestari, was born in Bogor (born 23 December 1994), is a native of Pramuka Island in the Java Sea, is also an Indonesian. A keen diver from childhood, began to show her interest in the sea since her father was assigned to Pramuka Island, an island located in the Seribu Islands cluster, who had been actively diving since childhood and really liked it. Her interest in environmental protection began when she began learning about waste management systems in 2015 while still an environmental engineering student at the Bandung Institute of Technology (ITB). Her father's experience in the Seribu Islands between 2003 and 2007 introduced Tenia to the sea, where she often dived around the north of Jakarta.

== Employment history ==
Swietenia is an activist for marine cleanliness, co-founders, executive director of Yayasan Penyelam Lestari Indonesia or Divers Clean Action (DCA), an environmental action community headquartered in Jakarta, and serves as the leads a team of volunteer divers who clear rubbish, especially plastic waste from the reefs and recycle what they find.

== Career ==
From there, she realized the serious challenge of the amount of waste that threatened the marine ecosystem in the Seribu Islands. To overcome this problem, she began to encourage the community to reduce plastic use and manage plastic waste better.

At that time, attention to the problem of marine waste was not as big as it is now. However, with the many discussions about land waste, final disposal sites (TPA), temporary disposal sites (TPS), and rivers, she decided to establish a community in the field of environmental conservation. In 2015, she founded Yayasan Penyelam Lestari Indonesia or Divers Clean Action (DCA) with a primary focus on cleaning up waste in the ocean, especially in the Seribu Islands, Jakarta. This community began to form when Tenia and her two friends held a clean-up event to collect data before determining the next steps.

In addition, at the same time, research by Jenna Jambeck highlighted that Indonesia was ranked second in contributing to marine waste in the world. This encouraged her community to carry out routine cleaning activities every one or two months.

As an underwater diver, Tenia often finds garbage scattered on the beach or sea surface. Indonesia is often referred to as the second largest producer of plastic waste in the sea after China, with the amount of plastic waste entering the sea reaching around 1.29 million tons per year according to the Ministry of Maritime Affairs and Fisheries (KKP).

Beginning with three people in 2015, the DCA has grown to 12 team members and nearly 1,500 volunteers across Indonesia. Lestari related that diving to collect waste can be dangerous because of the high currents, but that the rapid increase in tourism since 2007 has led to far more trash being dumped into the formerly pristine seas around Indonesia's many islands.

In 2017 Lestari founded the Indonesian Youth Marine Debris Summit (IYMDS). The same year, she represented Indonesia and spoke at the 2017 United Nations Climate Change Conference in Bonn, Germany. She also helped initiate an anti-plastic drinking straw campaign in Indonesia and convinced 700 restaurants to reduce the use of single-use straws.

In 2019, Lestari was listed among the BBC's 100 Women, a list of 100 inspiring and influential women. Later that year, she was invited to attend Barack and Michelle Obama's 'Obama Foundation Leaders Forum', which was held in Kuala Lumpur, Malaysia, in December. She was subsequently included in Forbes' "30 Under 30 – Asia – Social Entrepreneurs 2020".

=== DCA programs ===
One of DCA's first programs was Marine Debris Research, which involved clean-up activities by residents on the coast and underwater, including in residential areas, to collect data. Data from this research can be accessed by the public through their website, which is in collaboration with the Indonesian Institute of Sciences (LIPI). This data is used to support DCA's programs, including online and offline campaigns and training aimed at young people, such as the INA-Youth Marine Debris Summit.

One of the three programs being run is Community Development. Tenia explained that this program is implemented by fostering areas for varying periods of time, ranging from six months to three years. This aims to ensure that there is no more waste polluting the sea from the area.

Meanwhile, DCA's fourth program is collaborating with private companies. Usually this is done in the form of cooperation with Corporate Social Responsibility (CSR) or EPR Facilitator, where private companies are asked to systematically change their business processes to help reduce waste in the sea.

Tenia also noted that the COVID-19 pandemic has limited the volunteers' social activities. However, her programs continued despite adjustments at the beginning of the pandemic. In addition, her community also reduced tourism promotion.

Before the pandemic, Tenia and her community were active in group activities. They also developed a community eco-tourism program, but this could not be continued during the pandemic. Tenia felt that she had knowledge and direct experience about the difficulties of managing waste in coastal areas. At that time, Tenia felt that no one had succeeded in providing a solution to her concerns. Therefore, she decided to try to help the coastal areas that were of concern to her.

Currently, DCA has expanded to other provinces in Indonesia with more than a thousand volunteers who clean the sea and provide education to coastal residents about the importance of sorting waste. Tenia's dream is to have an Indonesian sea that is free from plastic waste. According to Tenia, DCA is now also reaching areas in North Jakarta and East Jakarta that are close to rivers, because according to her, the problems of marine waste and land-based waste are interrelated.

Thanks to her contribution to the environment, Tenia has become one of the influential women in environmental activities in the world, and has received many awards both nationally and internationally. She was even recognized as one of the BBC's 100 Most Inspiring Women, the youngest participant in Obama Leader, and was included in Forbes Asia's 30 under 30 list.

Tenia never imagined that she would establish a foundation that would have such an impact. Initially, she was just looking for the best way to address her concerns about marine and coastal waste. The impact of the program has been huge, with many young people trained by them and continuing their work as far away as Norway. Some have even established their own foundations and businesses based on the training they received from the programs.

== Educational background ==
Swietenia Puspa Lestari, she studied environmental engineering at Bandung Institute of Technology (ITB) and graduated in 2017.
