= Regent of Thousand Islands =

Head of the regency of Thousand Islands

- Bupati Kepulauan Seribu
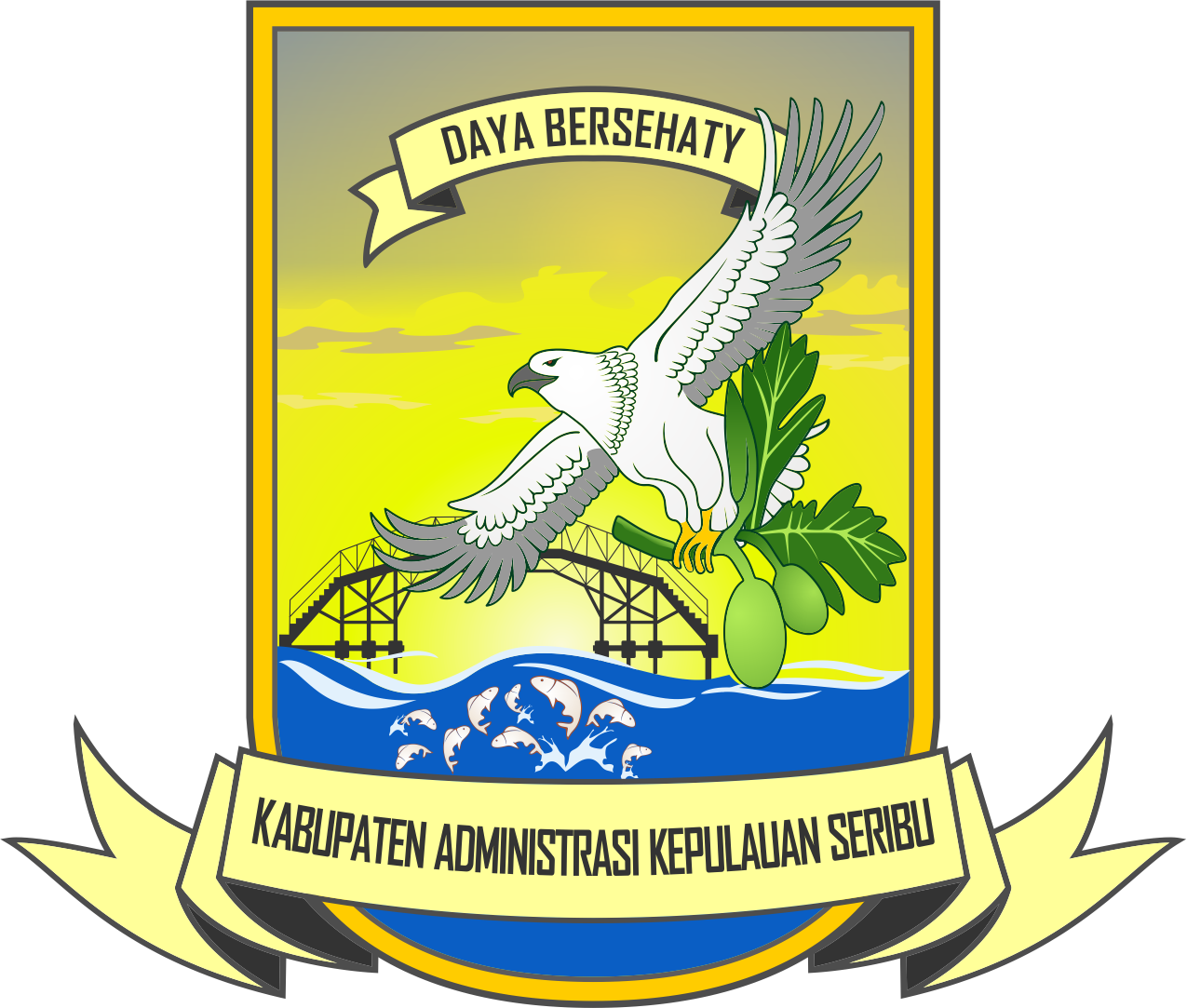
- Coat of arms of Thousand Islands
- Incumbent; Muhammad Fadjar Churniawan since 13 November 2024
- Residence: Official Residence of the Regent of Thousand Islands
- Seat: Pramuka Island
- Appointer: Governor of Jakarta
- Precursor: Head of Thousand Islands District
- Inaugural holder: Djoko Ramadhan (acting); Khalil Abdur Kadir
- Formation: 14 October 2001 (acting); 9 November 2001
- Deputy: Vice Regent of Thousand Islands
- Website: pulauseribu.jakarta.go.id/bupati

The Regent of Thousand Islands, officially the Administrative Regent of Thousand Islands, is the highest office in the regency of Thousand Islands. Unlike regents in other regencies in Indonesia, the regent is appointed directly by the governor. The regency has no regional parliament, thus making the regent responsible to the governor.

== Background ==
Prior to the formation of the office, the Thousand Islands was a kecamatan (district) and was governed by a camat (head of district). The camat's office was located in the Pramuka Island. The Thousand Islands was previously under the administration of North Jakarta City, making the camat responsible to the mayor of the city.

On 31 August 1999, the President of Indonesia, B. J. Habibie, enacted the Law No. 34 of 1999, which upgraded the status of the Thousand Islands from a district to a regency. The law mandated that the status upgrade should be done not later than 2001.

Preparations were held by the Jakarta province and the North Jakarta City. After preparations, President Abdurrahman Wahid enacted a decree that confirmed the establishment of the regency on 3 July 2001.

The original plan was that the regency, along with its first acting regent, would be formed and inaugurated on 19 June 2001. However, six days before the event, Jakarta government officials stated to reporters that the event was cancelled due to several reasons, such as insufficient preparations, the absence of names put forward as the first acting regent, and the conflict between the legislative and governor about the legal basis for the establishment of the regency.

The government announced another plan, stating that the first regent of the island would be inaugurated on 21 August 2001. Governor Sutiyoso put forward M. Rahardjo as his candidate for the regent. However, on the night before the inauguration, the government announced a delay after a meeting with the Speaker of the Jakarta Regional People's Representative Council. The Speaker, Edy Waluyo, announced that the delay was due to the council's disapproval of Sutiyoso's choice. To circumvent the delay, Sutiyoso inaugurated the first vice regent and secretary of the island — Djoko Ramadhan and Fajar Augustinus Panjaitan, respectively — on 14 October 2001. Sutiyoso stated that the appointments did not require any approval from the council. Thus, the vice regent became the acting regent of the region due to the absence of a definitive regent.

On 9 November 2001, the Thousand Islands was officially upgraded to a regency. Khalil Abdul Kadir was inaugurated as the first regent of the island on the same day, while the acting regent returned to his old office as vice regent.

== Appointment ==
The Regent of Thousand Islands is the only regent in Indonesia in which the officeholder is appointed by the governor instead of being elected by the people. Before swearing in the regent, the governor requires approval from the Jakarta Regional People's Representative Council. The council also has the right to recommend or examine the candidate for the office.

== List of Regents of Thousand Islands ==
No.	Photo	Regent	Took office	Left office	R
—		Djoko Ramadhan	14 October 2001	9 November 2001	
1.		Khamil Abdul Kadir	9 November 2001	19 October 2004	
2.		Djoko Ramadhan	19 October 2004	2008	
3.		Abdul Rahman Andit	2008	21 August 2009	
4.		Burhanuddin	21 August 2009	13 August 2010	
5.		Achmad Ludfi	13 August 2010	13 May 2013	
—		Djunaidi	13 May 2013	5 June 2013	
6.		Asep Syarifudin	5 June 2013	2 January 2015	
7.		Tri Djoko Sri Margianto	2 January 2015	3 July 2015	
—		Budi Utomo	3 July 2015	7 August 2015	
8.		Budi Utomo	7 August 2015	13 July 2017	
9.		Irmansyah	13 July 2017	5 July 2018	
10.		Husein Murad	5 July 2018	27 July 2020	
—		Junaedi	27 July 2020	4 September 2020	
11		Junaedi	4 September 2020	13 November 2024	
—		Muhammad Fadjar Churniawan	13 November 2024	7 May 2025	
12		Muhammad Fadjar Churniawan	7 May 2025	incumbent	
