= Tidung Island =

Island in Jakarta, Indonesia

Coordinates: 5.798°S 106.498°E

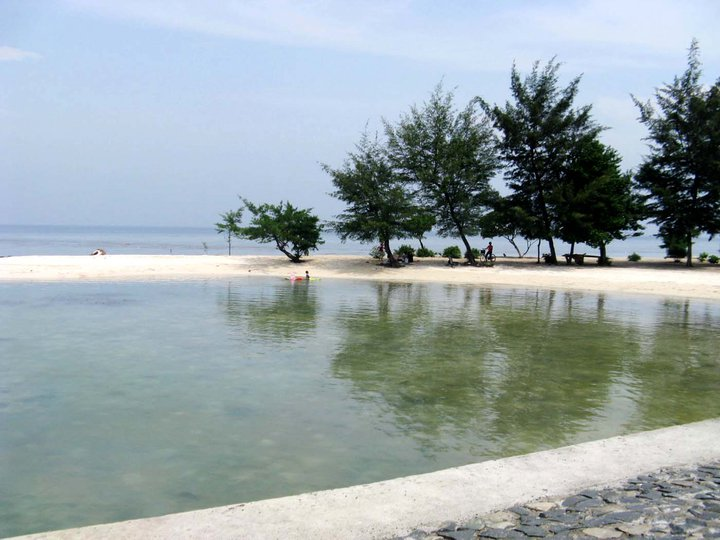

Tidung Island is one of the villages in the South Thousand Islands sub-district, Thousand Islands Regency, Jakarta, Indonesia.
