= Muhammad Fadjar Churniawan =

Indonesian civil servant

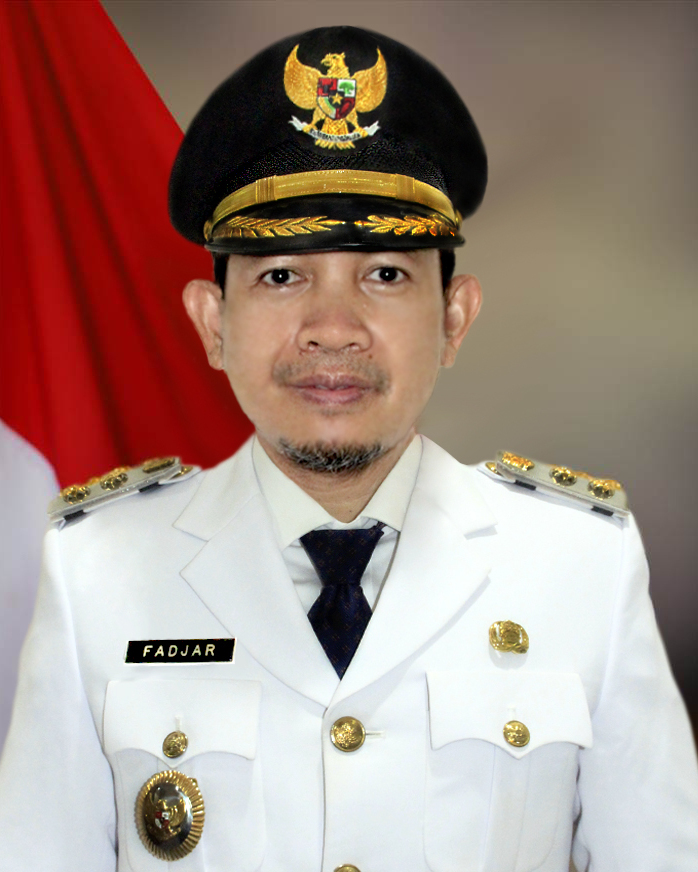

12th Regent of Thousand Islands
- Incumbent
- Assumed office 13 November 2024 (Note: Acting until 7 May 2025)
- Preceded by: Junaedi

Deputy Regent of Thousand Islands
- In office 20 August 2021 – 7 May 2025
- Preceded by: Junaedi
- Succeeded by: Aceng Zaeni

Personal details
- Education: Diponegoro University; Gadjah Mada University

Muhammad Fadjar Churniawan is an Indonesian civil servant and public administrator who is the incumbent Regent of Thousand Islands since 13 November 2024. He assumed office following the death of his predecessor Junaedi. Fadjar has held a number of offices in the Jakarta regional government, including as chief of the Pesanggrahan subdistrict and the deputy regent of Thousand Islands.

== Education ==
Fadjar Churniawan completed his undergraduate studies at the Diponegoro University in 1997 and earned a master’s degree in development economics from the Gadjah Mada University in 2002.

== Career ==
Churniawan’s career in public service began in 1998 as a staff member at the secretariat of the Administrative City of South Jakarta. From 1998 to 2004, he served as a staff member at the Secretariat, before being appointed as chief of civil service rotations from 2004 to 2008. In 2008, he briefly held the position of Head of the Subdivision of Career Development and subsequently served as a staff member at the secretariat until 2009.

In 2009, Churniawan was promoted as the secretary of the Kebayoran Lama subdistrict, serving until 2012. Churniawan then became deputy chief of the Pesanggrahan Subdistrict for five years, from 2012 to 2017. In 2017, he was appointed chief of South Jakarta's land procurement unit before returning to Pesanggrahan as chief from 2017 to 2019. He briefly served as the chief of the regional staffing agency of South Jakarta from 2019 to 2020 before returning to his old post as subdistrict chief from 2020 to 2021.

On 20 August 2021, Fadjar assumed his first office in the Jakarta regional government, serving as the deputy regent of the Thousand Islands under Junaedi. Upon the death of Junaedi on 13 November 2024, Fadjar became the acting regent of Thousland Islands. He assumed office as regent in a permanent capacity on 7 May 2025 after passing a fit and proper examination by Jakarta's regional house of representatives four days prior. His office as deputy regent was replaced by Aceng Zaeni.
