= Pramuka Island =

Island in Jakarta, Indonesia

Native name: pulau Pramuka (Indonesian); pulo Pramuké (Betawi); pulo Pramuko (Javanese); polo Pramoka (Madurese); libukang Pramukă (Buginese)
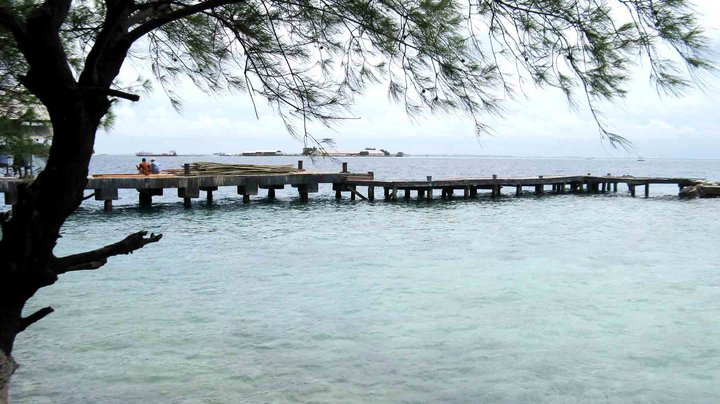
- Wharf at Pramuka Island

- Location in Java Pramuka Island (Indonesia)

Geography
- Location: Jakarta Bay
- Coordinates: 5.746°S 106.614°E
- Archipelago: Thousand Islands
- Area: 16 ha (40 acres)
- Highest elevation: 2 m (7 ft)

Administration
- Indonesia
- Province: Jakarta

Demographics
- Population: +2,000
- Ethnic groups: Betawi, Bugis, Banten, Jawa, Madura, Minangkabau.

Pramuka is an island in the Thousand Islands archipelagic regency in Jakarta which serves as the islands' regency seat.

== Demographics ==
Ethnic groups on the island are Betawi, Bugis, Bantenese, Javanese, Madura, and Minangkabau. Facilities on the island include a school, mosque, hospital, dock, and homestay for tourists.

== Transportation ==
This island can be reached in two and half hours by motorboat from Muara Angke Jakarta, or faster by speedboat from Marina Ancol Jakarta. Boat rentals to other islands in the archipelago are also available.

== Conservation ==
There is a hawksbill turtle (Erethmochelys imbricata) conservation on this island. The island coast is planted with mangroves to protect it.

== Notable native ==
A notable native is the environmental activist Swietenia Puspa Lestari.
