= Thousand Islands (Indonesia) =

Administrative regency in Jakarta, Indonesia

Thousand Islands Kepulauan Seribu
- Administrative regency
- Administrative Regency of Thousand Islands; Kabupaten Administrasi Kepulauan Seribu
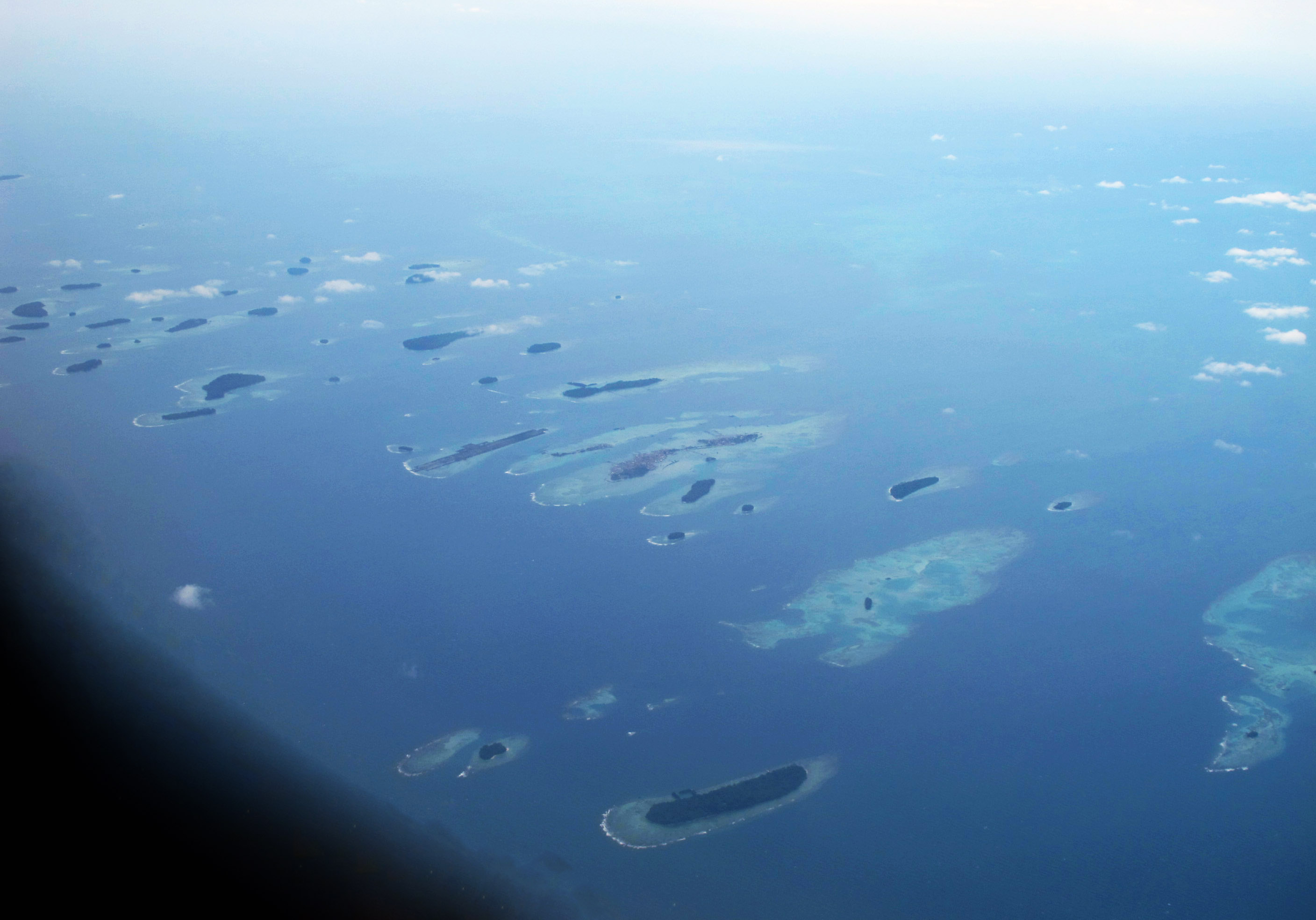
- The archipelago of Thousand Islands

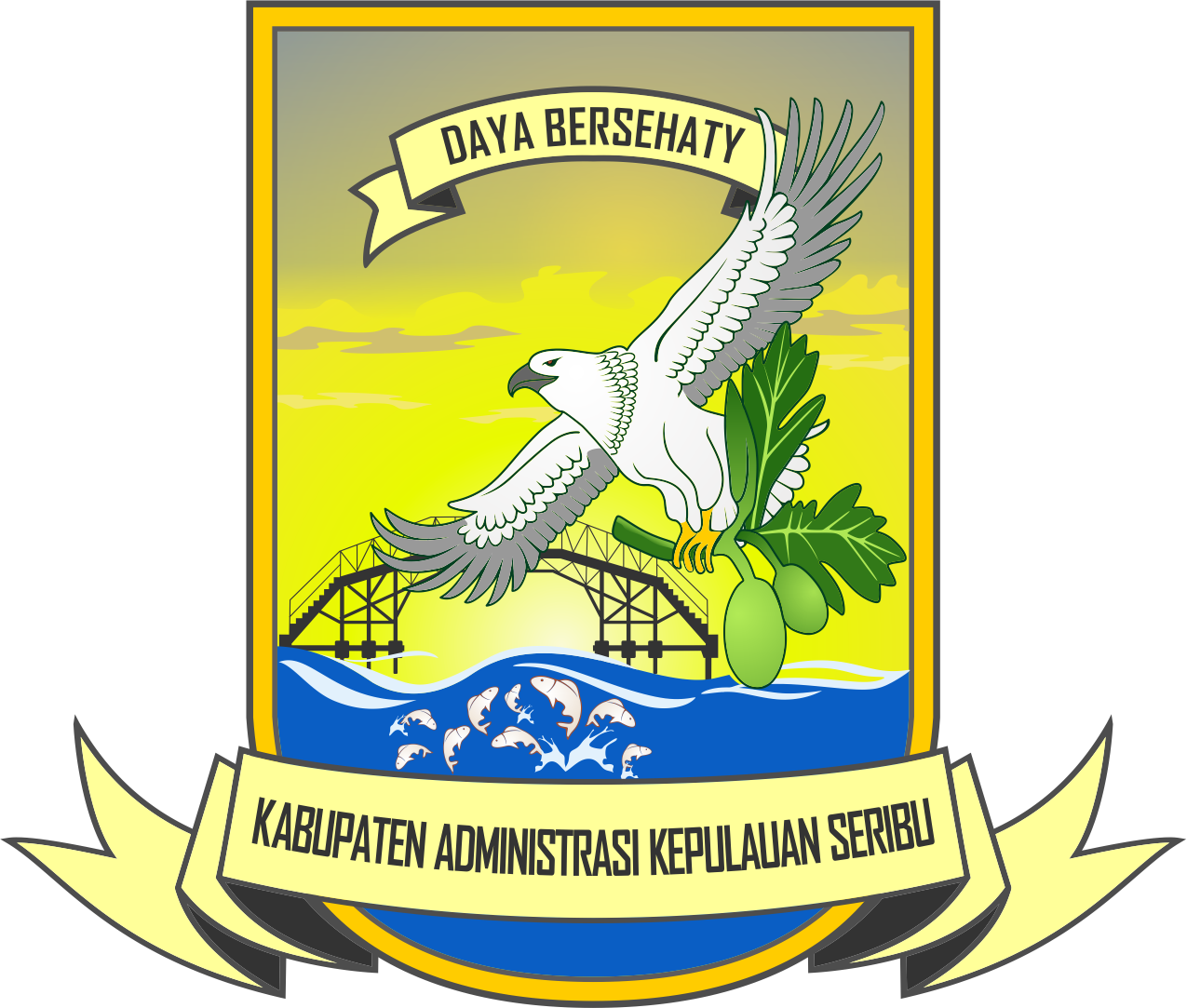
- Seal
- Motto: Daya Bersehaty
- Map of the Thousand Islands

- Location in Java and Indonesia Thousand Islands Regency (Indonesia)
- Coordinates: 5°42′S 106°35′E
- Country: Indonesia
- Special Region: Jakarta

Government
  - Regent: Muhammad Fadjar Churniawan
  - Vice-Regent: Aceng Zaeni

Area
  - Total: 10.18 km^{2} (3.93 sq mi)
- Elevation: 1 m (3.3 ft)
- Highest elevation: 7 m (23 ft)
- Lowest elevation: 0 m (0 ft)

Population (2020 census)
  - Total: 27,749
  - Density: 2,726/km^{2} (7,060/sq mi)

Demographics
  - Ethnic groups: Orang Pulo (native) (Note: The native inhabitants of the Thousand Islands who have a different language from the Betawi people on the mainland of Jakarta are called the Orang Pulo (lit. 'People of Islands') who are ethnically distinct. They are a mixture of various ethnicities forming a Malay creole.); Betawi; Sundanese; Javanese; Bugis; Mandarese
  - Religion (2017): Islam (99.91%); Christianity (0.07%); Protestantism (0.06%); Catholicism (0.01%); Buddhism (0.01%)
  - Languages and dialects: Indonesian (official); Orang Pulo (native); Betawi; Sundanese; Buginese
- Time zone: UTC+7 (WIB)
- Area code: +62 (21)
- Website: pulauseribu.jakarta.go.id

The Thousand Islands (Indonesian: Kepulauan Seribu) are a chain of islands to the north of Jakarta's coast. It forms the only regency of Special Capital Region of Jakarta, the metropolitan province of Indonesia. It consists of a string of 342 islands stretching 45 km (28 mi) north into the Java Sea at West Jakarta Bay and in fact are located to the north of Banten Province. Pramuka Island is the regency seat. The islands, along with North Jakarta City, are the only administrative divisions of Jakarta Special Capital Region with a coastline.

A decree states that 36 islands may be used for recreation. Of these, only 13 islands are fully developed: 11 islands are homes to resorts and two islands are historic parks. Twenty-three are privately owned and are not open to the public. The rest of the islands are either uninhabited or support a fishing village.

== History ==
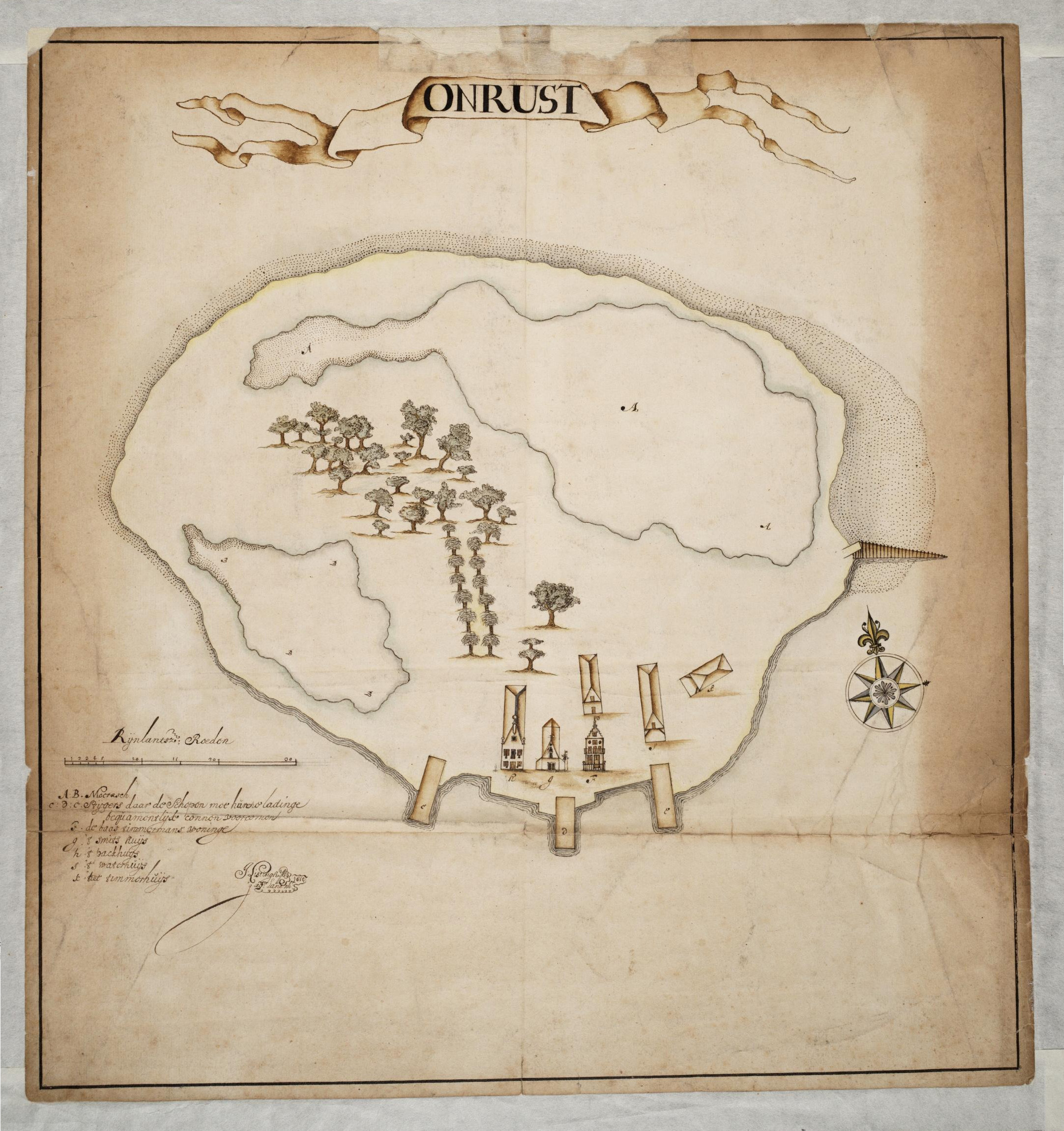
Map of Onrust Island (1650)

The modern history of the Thousand Islands begins with its role in the defenses of the city of Batavia for the Dutch East India Company (Dutch: Vereenigde Oostindische Compagnie, abbreviated VOC) and the Dutch colonial empire. Before the arrival of the Dutch, these islands already had their present Malay language name. With the arrival of the Dutch, the islands received a second Dutch name. The Malay names are not forgotten, as both Malay and Dutch names of the islands are written side by side in some 18th-century Batavia maps. Since the establishment of Batavia in 1610, Pulau Kapal, later named by the Dutch as Onrust Island, has been a naval base.

After the VOC failed to obtain control of trade at Banten in 1610, the Dutch obtained permission from Prince Jayakarta to build a dock at one of the islands in Jakarta Bay as a place to repair and equip ships sailing to Asia, particularly South East Asia. The island Prince Jayakarta assigned to the VOC was Onrust Island, a 12-hectare (30-acre) island 14 km (8.7 mi) from Jakarta.

In 1615 the VOC built a shipyard and a small storage house on the island, which Jan Pieterszoon Coen hoped would eventually develop into a trade and defence base against threats from Banten and rival European powers such as the English. The VOC constructed a small rectangular fort with two bastions in 1656; the bastions protruded from the fort and were used as look-out posts. The Dutch enlarged the fort in 1671 and gave it an asymmetrical pentagonal shape with a bastion in each corner. The whole structure was made of red bricks and coral. In 1674 additional storage buildings were built.

After the dissolution of the Dutch East India Company in 1799, the Batavian Republic took over the management of the Dutch East Indies. In 1800, a Royal Navy squadron under Captain Henry Lidgbird Ball, consisting of HMS Daedalus, HMS Sybille, HMS Centurion and HMS Braave entered the area. Ball's squadron seized five Dutch armed vessels, destroyed 22 other vessels and destroyed all the facilities on Onrust Island before withdrawing.

After the British departed, the Dutch rebuilt the facilities on Onrust Island, completing the work in 1806. However, a second British attack in the same year led by Admiral Edward Pellew again destroyed the facilities on the island. When the British occupied Batavia in 1811, they repaired the facilities on Onrust Island prior to handing over the Dutch East Indies to the Netherlands in 1816.

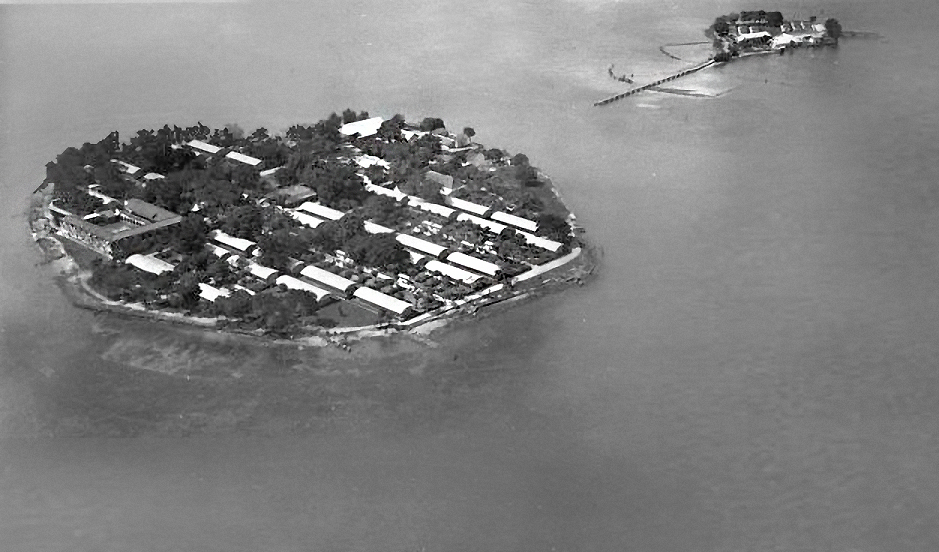
Onrust Island is a historic island in the thousand Islands which functioned as a quarantine site for Dutch East Indies Hajj pilgrims

Onrust Island again received attention in 1827 during the period of Governor-General G.A.Baron Van Der Capellen and activities in the island were normal again in 1848. In 1856 a floating shipyard was built. However, the construction of Tanjung Priok harbour in 1883 resulted in a decline in the role and significance of Onrust island. In 1911–1933, Onrust island became a quarantine station for pilgrims returning from the Hajj. A barrack was built in 1911 that contained 35 units for about 100 pilgrims.

From 1933 until 1940, the Dutch used Onrust to hold the mutineers involved in the Incident of the Seven Provinces (Zeven Provincien). In 1940, the Dutch used it to hold Germans, such as Steinfurt, who was the Chief Administrator of Onrust Island. After the Japanese invaded Indonesia in 1942, the role of Onrust island declined again and it became a prison for serious criminals.

After Indonesia proclaimed independence in 1945, the island became a leprosarium under the control of the Indonesian Ministry of Health, until 1960. The leprosarium then relocated to Post VII at Tanjung Priok Port.

After a coup by General Suharto, Chris Soumokil, who had proclaimed a Republic of South Moluccas with himself as president, was arrested and held at Onrust. Soumukil was later executed there on 21 April 1966.

In 1972 Ali Sadikin, then governor of Jakarta, declared Onrust Island a protected historical site. In 2002 the administration made Onrust and its three neighbors – the islands of Cipir, Kelor and Bidadari – an archaeological park to protect the artifacts and ruins on the islands that date back to the time of the Dutch East India Company.

On 28 February 2020, 188 Indonesian crew members from the cruise ship World Dream were quarantined for 14 days on the uninhabited Sebaru Kecil islet against COVID-19.

On 9 January 2021, a Boeing 737-500 (PK-CLC) operating Sriwijaya Air Flight 182 went missing after taking off from Jakarta Soekarno–Hatta Airport on route to Pontianak Supadio Airport. The aircraft crashed near the Thousand Islands.

== Ecology ==
Kepulauan Seribu Marine National Park
- Taman Nasional Laut Kepulauan Seribu
- IUCN category II (national park)
- Location within Java Location within Indonesia
- Location: Java Sea, Indonesia
- Nearest city: Jakarta
- Coordinates: 5°44′44″S 106°36′55″E
- Area: 107,489 hectares (265,610 acres; 1,074.89 km^{2})
- Established: October 10, 1982
- Visitors: 777,008 (in 2019)
- Governing body: Ministry of Environment and Forestry
- Website: tnlkepulauanseribu.net

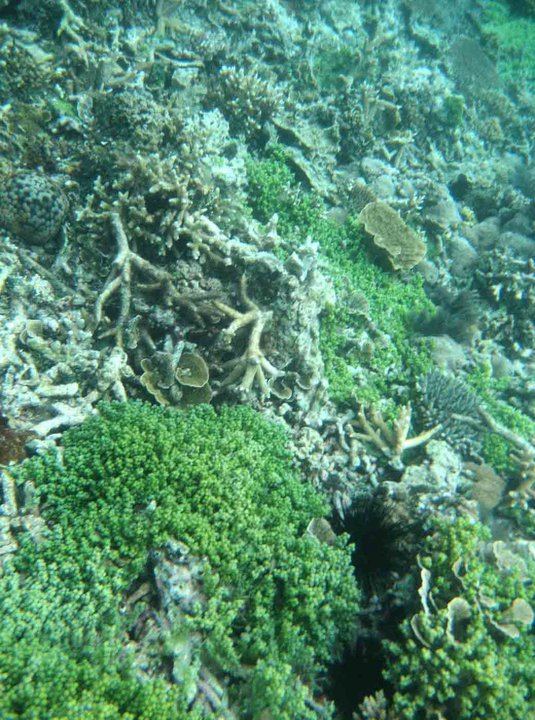
Coral reefs in Kepulauan Seribu

An area of 107,489 hectares (415.02 sq mi) of land and sea was declared by the Minister of Agriculture in 1982 and designated by a Forestry Ministerial Decree in 2002 as the Taman Nasional Laut Kepulauan Seribu (Thousand Islands Marine National Park). Public access is prohibited on two of the islands, Panjaliran Barat and Panjaliran Timur, where sea turtles are conserved.

The Thousand Islands Marine National Park is located 45 km (28 mi) north of Jakarta. It is mostly located on the Kecamatan of Kepulauan Seribu Utara district of North Thousand Islands), which is the northern part of the Thousand Islands. The complex contains 342 reef platforms, with 110 forming an island larger than half an acre. There may be as many as 700 individual reefs in the complex.

In general, the plants that grow in the park are dominated by coastal species including coconut palm (Cocos nucifera), pandan (Pandanus sp.), cemara laut (Casuarina equisetifolia), cangkudu (Morinda citrifolia), butun (Barringtonia asiatica), mangroves (Bruguiera sp.), breadfruit (Artocarpus altilis), ketapang (Terminalia catappa), and kecundang (Cerbera odollam).

Sea vegetation commonly found in the park consists of seaweed divisions including Rhodophyta, Chlorophyta and Phaeophyta as well as classes of sea grasses such as Halimeda sp., Padina sp., Thalassia sp., Sargassum sp., and Caulerpa sp.

The dominant animals in the park include 54 sea biota species which form part of the coral reef ecosystem, 144 species of fish, two species of giant clam, six species of sea grass, sea worms of various colours and 17 species of coastal bird.

This park forms a hatching site for the hawksbill sea turtle and green sea turtle. The hawksbill turtle is an endangered species and is rarely found in other waters. These turtles are bred on Pramuka Island. This activity is aimed at recovering the turtle population, which had almost reached extinction. Breeding activities include egg hatching in a semi-natural way and caring for the baby turtles till they are ready to be released into their natural habitat.

Most coastal areas of this park are surrounded by mangrove forest, where monitor lizards, golden ring snakes and reticulated pythons can be found.

== Islands and administrative divisions ==
The islands of the Thousand Islands form an administrative regency which belongs to the Special Capital Region of Jakarta. As an administrative regency, Thousand Islands does not have its own local legislatures (Dewan Perwakilan Rakyat Daerah) while the regent is directly appointed by the governor. The geographical features of Thousand Islands made Jakarta the only capital entity in the world that contains more than 100 islands within its boundaries until its replacement as capital by Nusantara. In the official list, the Thousand Islands Regency contains 110 islands and is divided into two districts or kecamatan: the Kecamatan of Kepulauan Seribu Selatan, or South Thousand Islands, and the Kecamatan of Kepulauan Seribu Utara, or North Thousand Islands. The former district has an administrative code (kode wilayah) of 31.01.02, and the latter of 31.01.01. Each kecamatan in turn is divided into three kelurahan.

Below are the complete list of the islands in the Thousand Islands (kepulauan Seribu):

=== Kecamatan Kepulauan Seribu Selatan (South Thousand Islands) ===
The Kecamatan (District) of Kepulauan Seribu Selatan (South Thousand Islands) is the closest district to the coast of Jakarta. It covers a land area of 3.04 km^{2}. It had an estimated population of 12,474 in mid-2022. Being closer to the coast of Jakarta, the waters around the islands suffer from the pollution coming from the Jakarta Bay. The pollution is the result of the poor living condition of the majority of people living along the bay, as well as nutrient inputs from agricultural runoff, industrial pollution, and wastewater. The district contains the historic Onrust Island Archeology Park.

The Kecamatan of Kepulauan Seribu Selatan is sub-divided into three administrative villages (classed as urban kelurahan): Kelurahan Pulau Untung Jawa, Kelurahan Pulau Pari, and Kelurahan Pulau Tidung. Pulau Untung Jawa Kelurahan contains 15 islands, Pulau Tidung Kelurahan contains six islands, and Pulau Pari Kelurahan contains ten islands.

==== Kelurahan Pulau Untung Jawa ====
The Kelurahan (administrative village) of Pulau Untung Jawa (postal code 14510) is the closest kelurahan to the coast of Jakarta. Officially, there are 15 islands in the administrative village. The administrative village of Pulau Untung Jawa contains more archaeological artifacts than the rest of the Kepulauan Seribu's islands as it is located closer to Jakarta, being a strategic location for military defenses as well as transit points for the Dutch colony.

Some islands have been gradually eroded by the sea water, due to dredging of the surrounding reef. Names in italics are not considered islands anymore.

Island	Location	Remarks	Image
Air Besar / Ayer Besar	6°00′15″S 106°46′53″E	Also known as Ayer, it is privately developed as a resort. The Dutch named the island after the city Hoorn.	
Bidadari / Sakit	6°02′09″S 106°44′48″E	Bidadari ("Heavenly nymph") Island was named Purmerend by the Dutch after the Dutch town. In 1850 the Dutch built a Martello tower here as part of a set of fortifications that protected the approaches to Batavia. Photos suggest that Martello Menara was not a true Martello, but rather a circular fort. The tower was operational until 1878, when it became a storage site. It too was badly damaged by the Krakatoa explosion and was abandoned in 1908. All that remains now is the base up to a meter or two above ground. Bidadari was also known as Pulau Sakit (Sick Island) as it housed a leper colony during the 17th century. More recently, the island came to be called "Angel Island", to honor the leprosarium that had been there. Bidadari is a privately developed resort island with some facilities for archaeological tourism.	
Bokor	5°56′37″S 106°37′51″E	Bokor Island is the westernmost island of the administrative village of Pulau Untung Jawa. During the Dutch colonial era, it was named Kleine Kombuis ("small galley"), to distinguish it from Groote Kombuis ("large galley"), now Lancang Besar and Lancang Kecil Island, two islands belonging to the Pulau Pari administrative village. There has been a confusion whether Bokor Island belongs to the administrative village of Pulau Untung Jawa or the administrative village of Pulau Pari. Bokor Island is a wildlife reserve protecting a variety of birds.	
Cipir / Kahyangan	6°02′22″S 106°44′09″E	The Dutch named this island de Kuyper Eiland; The British called it Kuyper's or Cooper's Island. During the Dutch colonial era, a shipyard was established in the island. In the early 20th Century a narrow, floating bridge linked Cipir and Onrust islands. At the time, it too functioned as a quarantine station for the hajj pilgrim. The island contains some ruins from the Dutch colonial era.	
Damar Besar / Edam / Damar Tengah	5°57′26″S 106°50′40″E	Named Edam during the colonial period, after a Dutch town. The island contains a 65-meter lighthouse, built in 1879, known as Vast Licht. It is still used for sea traffic.	
Damar Kecil / Monyet / Wanara	5°59′01″S 106°50′50″E	Named Alkmaar during the colonial period, after a Dutch town. The island is a post for the Indonesian Navy.	
Dapur	5°55′00″S 106°43′00″E	Dapur ("kitchen") Island (Dapoer during colonial period) is the northernmost island in the administrative village of Pulau Untung Jawa. It is a low brush-covered islet.	
Karang Air Kecil / Ayer Kecil / Nusi	5°59′00″S 106°46′00″E	"Little Ayer", so called to make it distinct with Ayer Besar, "Large Ayer". During the colonial period, it was named Haarlem by the Dutch, after the city of Haarlem. The reef surrounding the island was removed, as a result, the island has been eroded and has disappeared.	
Karang Ayer Sedang	5°58′43″S 106°44′56″E	This reef is located between the islands of Ayer Besar and Untung Jawa.	
Karang Pasir		Karang Pasir is the southernmost reef in the administrative village. It contains no island.	
Kelor	6°01′33″S 106°44′43″E	Named Engelse ("English") Onrust during the colonial period, and was used as cemetery. Later the Dutch renamed it into Kerkhof eiland (Cemetery island) and eventually Kelor. The island contains a circular tower-like structure, often referred to as Martello tower, though it is not one.	
Nyamuk Besar / Nirwana	6°01′52″S 106°50′53″E	Nirwana ("heaven, paradise") Island is the easternmost island of Kepulauan Seribu Regency. Abrasion has caused the island to disappear gradually.	
Nyamuk Kecil / Talak	6°00′24″S 106°49′47″E	Abrasion has caused the island to disappear.	
Onrust / Undrus / Kapal	6°02′00″S 106°44′05″E	With the arrival of the Dutch, Kapal (Malay "ship") Island was named Onrust ("unrest") by the Dutch. Onrust was the site of a major shipyard and five-sided fort that had belonged to the by then defunct Dutch East India Company. The Dutch had to rebuild the naval base on Onrust several times due to British attacks, such as the one in 1800. The last restoration was in 1840. During the 19th Century Onrust held a sanitorium for people suffering from tuberculosis and a quarantine station for pilgrims returning from the Hajj to Mecca. (Note: It was the pilgrim flow to Mecca that caused the Netherlands Trading Society to establish a bank branch in Jeddah in 1926. Until 1948 this was the only bank of any kind in what is now Saudi Arabia. This bank branch became what is now Saudi Hollandi Bank.) The quarantine barracks took up some two-thirds of the island and could hold 3,500 pilgrims. Over the years erosion reduced Onrust from its original 12 hectares (30 acres) to 7.5 hectares (19 acres) (2002). The administration then built concrete retaining walls around the island but these are now in a dilapidated state.	
Rambut	5°58′26″S 106°41′32″E	Named Middelburgh during the colonial period, after the Dutch city. Rambut ("hair") Island is located 800 m (2,600 ft) to the west of Untung Jawa Island. During the Dutch colonial era, the island was used as a military defense point. The Island contains the remain of a sunken dock. In 1999, a wildlife reserve was established in the island. The idea was based on an idea by the director of Botanical Garden of Bogor during the governance of the Dutch Indies. The island contains a watchtower for birdwatching.	
Ubi Besar	6°00′02″S 106°44′27″E	Named Rotterdam during the colonial period, after a Dutch city. Ubi Besar Island is eroding rapidly as the reef around it is dredged. According to local records, Ubi Besar has been submerged since 1956.	
Ubi Kecil	6°00′24″S 106°42′52″E	Named Schiedam during the colonial period, after a Dutch city. Coral reefs were removed at Ubi Kecil Islands, and as a result of subsequent erosion, the island has been submerged since 1949.	
Untung Jawa	5°58′39″S 106°42′25″E	Named Amsterdam during the colonial period, after a Dutch city, Untung Jawa is the capital of Kelurahan Pulau Untung Jawa. The island is located 800 m (2,600 ft) to the east of Rambut Island. The island contains a settlement and mangrove forest.	

==== Kelurahan Pulau Pari ====
The Kelurahan (administrative village) of Pulau Pari (postal code 14520) mainly consists of archipelago of islands around the reef of Pari Island. The boundary of the administrative village is everything to the east of an imaginary line which run north to south between Karang Beras Island (the easternmost island of the Pulau Tidung administrative village) and Gundul Island (the westernmost island of the Pulau Pari administrative village in the official map, but in reality there is no island in the coordinates). Officially, there are ten islands in the administrative village.

The administrative center of Pulau Pari administrative village is located in Pari Island, which is located in an extensive reef system which also contains the islands of Biawak, Kongsi, Tikus, Burung, and several others.

Island	Location	Remarks	Image
Biawak	5°51′10″S 106°37′08″E	"Monitor lizard". Not to be confused with the Biawak island of Indramayu Regency. This small island is located to the north of Pari Island and belongs to the same reef system.	
Burung	5°51′52″S 106°35′55″E	Privately owned. This small island is located to the west of Pari Island and belongs to the same reef system.	
Gundul	?	In official maps, the island is supposed to be located at the westernmost edge of the reef system belonging to the Pari Island, but in reality there is no island in the coordinates, making Tikus Island as the westernmost island in the reef.	
Karang Jong	5°51′13″S 106°38′44″E	Karang Jong is a tiny islet of sand and coral around 1.5 km (0.93 mi) east of Pari Island. The light on the islet is a green tower standing on piles.	
Karang Kudus / Karang Gudus	5°51′10″S 106°37′12″E	Privately owned. The island is located to the north of Pari Island, belonging to the same reef system.	
Kongsi	5°51′24″S 106°36′03″E	This small island is located to the west of Pari Island and belongs to the same reef system. It contains a pier and a small settlement.	
Kudus Lempeng / Gudus Lempeng	5°51′13″S 106°37′22″E	This small reef / island is located to the north of Pari Island and belongs to the same reef system as Pari Island.	
Lancang Besar	5°55′42″S 106°35′05″E	Lancang Besar Island is the second largest island in the administrative village. It belongs to its own reef system which also makes out the Lancang Kecil Island. The island contains a fishing village and a protected mangrove forest. In the 19th century, instead of two islands, Lancang Besar and Lancang Kecil was merged as a single island, named the Groote Kombuis ("large galley"), to make it distinct with the Kleine Kombuis ("small galley") island, now Bokor Island.	
Lancang Kecil	5°56′14″S 106°35′39″E	Privately owned. The island is located to the south of the Pari Island reef system. It belongs to a reef system which also makes out the Lancang Besar Island. The island is slightly smaller than the Lancang Besar island and is uninhabited. The eastern part of the island is covered with mangroves. see Lancang Besar	
Pari	5°51′26″S 106°37′11″E	The capital of the Kelurahan of Pulau Pari and the largest island in the Pari reef system and in the administrative village. The reef system that surrounds the Pari Island is extensive and contains the island of Tikus, Tengah, Burung, Biawak, Kongsi, and several sandbars as well as coral reefs. Unlike the other reef system of Kepulauan Seribu, the reef of Pari Island is mainly allocated for research, and therefore it is less disturbed by tourism. The reef system also contains mangrove forests. Since 1997, Pari Island and its surrounding reef has been used as the center of oceanographic study by the Indonesian Institute of Sciences.	
Tengah	5°51′30″S 106°36′17″E	Privately owned. This small island is located to the west of Pari Island and belongs to the same reef system.	
Tikus	5°51′45″S 106°34′59″E	Tikus ("rat") Island is a small island located to the west of Pari Island and belongs to the same reef system. It is currently the westernmost island in the administrative village. The island is mainly used for research.	

==== Kelurahan Pulau Tidung ====
The Kelurahan (administrative Village) of Pulau Tidung (postal code 14520) consists of seven islands. Officially it is listed as having six islands, in which Karang Beras Kecil Island is not included.

Island	Location	Remarks	Image
Karang Beras	5°46′15″S 106°33′36″E	Karang Beras Island is the northernmost island in the administrative village of Pulau Tidung. It is the largest island to sit within its own reef, which also contains the Karang Beras Kecil island. The island is used for recreation and contains cottages.	
Karang Beras Kecil	5°46′11″S 106°33′14″E	The island is located to the west of Karang Beras. It sits on the same reef as Karang Beras Island. The island is elongated in shape and covered in tall trees.	
Karang Besar	5°53′00″S 106°28′00″E	Formerly known as Struisvogel Klipper, Karang Besar ("big reef") Island is a group of six small coral reefs.	
Karang Laut		Karang Laut ("sea reef") Island is located 3.2 km (2.0 mi) to the west of Karang Besar.	
Karang Purak			
Laki	5°57′27″S 106°31′17″E	Laki ("men") Island is the southernmost island in the administrative village of Pulau Tidung. During the Dutch colonial period, the island was named Menschen-eter ("man-eater"), which may explains the present name. It is located approximately 3.7 miles from the mainland of Java. The island was formerly developed as a resort, but it is now nonoperational. About 1.6 km east of Laki Island is a reef system connected to Tanjung Kait, a cape on the island of Java; this shallow reef system was named Rif van den Menschen-eter during the colonial period.	
Payung Besar / Pajung Besar	5°49′18″S 106°33′15″E	Payung Besar ("big umbrella") Island is a 20 hectares (49.42 acres) teardrop-shaped island located to the southeast of the Tidung Island reef system. It is called payung, Malay/Indonesian "umbrella/parasol", either because it has a tapered teardrop-shape similar to a payung, or – according to an unsourced folklore – once a ruler of a kingdom told his hulubalang to search for a precious stone called mustika kelabang (an agate with centipede-like pattern); the hulubalang, who was equipped with a golden parasol, found the gemstone in this island, but he could not retrieve it and so he left the island together with the golden parasol, hence the name of the island. The island sits on its own reef system. Payung Besar Island contains a 350-meter wooden pier, a 15-metre-high (49 ft) white metal framework lighthouse (constructed in 1890), later replaced with a 32-metre-high (105 ft) metal framework lighthouse in 1967, and a small settlement of 167 inhabitants. The island contains two shallow water snorkeling area.	
Payung Kecil / Pajung Kecil	5°48′51″S 106°32′56″E	Payung Kecil ("little umbrella") Island is a small island located 600 m (660 yd) north of Payung Besar Island. It lies on a reef detached from Payung Besar Island. This small island (0.46 hectares) is treeless and sandy. It contains two cottages used for managing aquaculture.	
Tidung Besar	5°47′56″S 106°30′00″E	Capital of the Kelurahan of Pulau Tidung. At 50.13 hectares (123.87 acres), Tidung Besar ("large Tidung"), also known as Tidung Barat ("western Tidung"), is the largest island in the Kelurahan of Pulau Tidung and the largest island in Kepulauan Seribu. Tidung Besar sits within its own reef system, which also contains Tidung Kecil, the archipelago was named Hoorn Eilanden by the Dutch, after Dutch city. Tidung Besar is elongated in shape, measuring 3.8 km (2.4 mi) from west to east and 300 m (984 ft) from north to south. The current settlement in Pulau Tidung was established during the 1920s. Tidung Besar is connected to Tidung Kecil via a 630-metre-long (2,070 ft) wooden bridge. Tidung Besar contains the burial place of Raja Pandita, also known as Muhammad Kaca, a leader of the tribe of Tidung from Kalimantan Timur, who rejected Dutch imperialism. He was exiled to Tidung Besar Island in 1892 and died there in 1898. The tomb of Raja Pandita and his family was rediscovered in February 2011. The tomb was moved to a new location, the removal being conducted in accordance with the traditional rites of the Tidung tribe. On 3 July 3, 2011, the Regent of Kepulauan Seribu officially proclaimed the tomb complex of Raja Pandita as a cultural heritage site.	
Tidung Kecil	5°48′12″S 106°31′24″E	Privately owned. Tidung Kecil ("small Tidung") is an elongated island to the east of Tidung Besar Island. It is connected to Tidung Besar via a 630-metre-long (2,070-foot) wooden bridge called Jembatan Cinta ("Love Bridge").	

=== Kecamatan Kepulauan Seribu Utara (North Thousand Islands) ===
The Kecamatan (District) of Kepulauan Seribu Utara ("North Thousand Islands") is located further north from Jakarta. It covers a land area of 5.65 km^{2}. It had an estimated population of 17,245 in mid-2022. The sea water is cleaner than that of the South Thousand Islands because of its location further away from the Bay of Jakarta. The cleaner water is able to sustain more varieties of marine life.

On January 1, 1982, some of the islands in the Kecamatan of North Thousand Islands were declared a Marine National Park under the name Taman Nasional Laut Kepulauan Seribu (Thousand Islands Marine National Park).

The Kecamatan of Kepulauan Seribu Utara is sub-divided into three administrative villages (classed as urban kelurahan): Kelurahan Pulau Panggang, Kelurahan Pulau Kelapa, and Kelurahan Pulau Harapan.

==== Kelurahan Pulau Panggang ====
The Kelurahan (administrative village) of Pulau Panggang (postal code 14530) makes up the southern part of the Kecamatan of Kepulauan Seribu Utara. Officially, the Kelurahan contains 13 islands.

Pulau Panggang was officially inaugurated as the administrative center of the Kelurahan Pulau Panggang in August 1986, and on July 27, 2000, when Kepulauan Seribu was elevated from a district (kecamatan) into a regency (kabupaten). Pulau Pramuka, the administrative center of Kepulauan Seribu Regency, is located in the Kelurahan of Pulau Panggang.

Names in italics are not considered islands.

Island	Location	Remarks	Image
Air	5°45′54″S 106°34′58″E	Air Island (spelled Aijer in colonial times) is the southernmost island of in the Pulau Panggang administrative village. The island – or more appropriately islands – sits on its own reef. The islands within the reef are separated by channels created by dredging the bottom part of the reef. Some map listed Gosong Air (Air sand bar) within the eastern part of the reef. The island is used for recreation and contains cottages.	
Gosong Air		Gosong Air is a treeless sand bar located on the east side of the reef which also makes up the island of Air.	
Gosong Pandan, Pandan	5°42′40″S 106°33′57″E	Pandan Island is located 1 km to the west of Karang Congkak Island. This small island sits on its own reef.	
Karang Balik			
Karang Bongkok	5°41′05″S 106°33′44″E	This small elongated island is the only island on its own reef system which extends much larger than the island itself. The island is allocated for reafforestation.	
Karang Congkak / Gosong Congkak	5°42′31″S 106°34′34″E	This small elongated island is allocated for reafforestation. It is the only island in its reef system, which extends much larger than the island itself.	
Karang Lebar			
Karya	5°44′07″S 106°36′03″E	Karya island, formerly known as Cina Island, is located about 500 m north of Panggang Island in its own reef. The island contains two administrative offices of the Regency of Kepulauan Seribu, one of them is the police headquarter of the Kepulauan Seribu. The shallow water of the Pulau Karya's reef is used as milkfish aquaculture.	
Kotok Besar	5°42′02″S 106°32′20″E	Developed as a resort, the island contains three wooden piers and a small harbor.	
Kotok Kecil	5°42′00″S 106°42′00″E	Kotok Kecil Island is the westernmost island in the Pulau Panggang administrative village. The island is located to the north of Kotok Besar and sits on its own reef. It contains a small pier.	
Layar	5°44′02″S 106°33′50″E	A small sand bar which lies 870 metres (2,850 feet) to the west of Semak Daun Island. This sand bar sits on its own reef.	
Opak Kecil	5°40′43″S 106°35′16″E	Opak Kecil Island is the northernmost island of Pulau Panggang administrative village. The island is located to the east of Karang Bongkok Island and sits on its own reef system. The island reportedly can be distinguished because it contains two trees with fan-shaped tops.	
Panggang	5°44′19″S 106°36′04″E	Panggang Island is the capital of Kelurahan Pulau Panggang. The island is densely populated with fishing villages, extremely packed that the residences extend to the sea. The building is much less developed and less facilitated as opposed to Pramuka Island.	
Peniki / Paniki	5°41′40″S 106°42′44″E	Peniki Island is relatively isolated from the other islands of the Pulau Panggang Administrative Village. It is located around 11 kilometres (6.8 miles) east of the archipelago that forms most of the Northern Thousand Island District.	
Pramuka / Lang / Long	5°44′45″S 106°36′51″E	Pramuka ("scout") Island, also known as Lang or Long since at least the 19th-century, is the capital of the Regency of Kepulauan Seribu. Pramuka Island contains a settlement that includes schools, a mosque, a hospital, a port, fish auctioning center, and lodging for travelers.	
Sekat / Sekati	5°45′35″S 106°36′28″E	Sekati Island is located to the east of Air Island. The island contains a wooden pier and some cottages.	
Semak Daun	5°43′48″S 106°34′16″E	Semak Daun Island is a conservation island which contains an aquaculture. This small island (0.75 ha) sits on its own reef that has a much larger area (750 ha) than Semak Daun Island itself, which is the only island on the reef.	

==== Kelurahan Pulau Kelapa ====
The Kelurahan (administrative village) of Pulau Kelapa (postal code 14540) makes up the western part of the Kecamatan of Kepulauan Seribu Utara. Officially, the Kelurahan of Pulau Kelapa contains 36 islands.

Names in italics are not considered islands.

Island	Location	Remarks	Image
Bundar / Bunder	5°30′46″S 106°31′32″E	Bundar ("round") Island sits on the reef which contains the islands of Sebaru Kecil, Kapas, and Lipan. The island is privately owned.	
Cina	5°34′12″S 106°33′01″E		
Dua Barat	5°25′15″S 106°28′16″E	One of the northernmost island in Kepulauan Seribu.	
Gentang Besar	5°37′02″S 106°33′10″E	Privately owned.	
Genteng Kecil	5°37′27″S 106°32′43″E	Privately owned.	
Gosong Yu	5°32′36″S 106°31′16″E	Gosong Yu is a sandbar 400 metres (1,300 feet) northeast of Yu Barat Island.	
Hantu Barat / Antuk Barat	5°32′21″S 106°32′08″E	Hantu Barat Island sits on the reef which makes up the islands of Yu Barat, Yu Timur, Kelor Barat, Kelor Timur, Satu, Jukung, and Hantu Timur. Pantara developed the island privately as a resort.	
Hantu Timur / Antuk Timur	5°31′56″S 106°32′36″E	Hantu Timur is the northernmost island on the reef which makes up the islands of Yu Barat, Yu Timur, Kelor Barat, Kelor Timur, Satu, Jukung, and Hantu Barat. Pantara developed the island privately as a resort. The island contains two wooden piers and a helipad.	
Jukung	5°34′11″S 106°31′41″E	Jukung is the southernmost island of the reef which makes up the islands of Yu Barat, Yu Timur, Kelor Barat, Kelor Timur, Satu, Hantu Barat, and Hantu Timur. The island is developed for aquaculture.	
Kaliageh Besar / Kaliage Besar	5°39′47″S 106°34′04″E	Privately owned. Kaliageh Besar island is located to the south of Kelapa Island and sits on its own reef.	
Kaliageh Kecil / Kaliage Kecil	5°40′04″S 106°34′05″E	Privately owned. Kaliageh Kecil island is located to the south of Kaliageh Besar Island.	
Kapas	5°30′47″S 106°31′11″E	Kapas ("cotton") island belongs to the same reef system as the islands of Sebaru Kecil, Bundar, and Lipan. It is the smallest island on the reef.	
Kayu Angin Bira	5°36′24″S 106°34′02″E	Kayu Angin Bira is located to the west of Bira Island.	
Kayu Angin Melintang	5°35′01″S 106°33′07″E	Kayu Angin Melintang is a small island southeast of Melintang Besar Island.	
Kayu Angin Putri	5°35′24″S 106°33′29″E	Kayu Angin Putri is located to the east of Panjang Bawah Island.	
Kayu Angin Selatan / Kayu Angin Genteng / Genteng	5°37′12″S 106°33′41″E	Kayu Angin Selatan is a small island located around 400 metres (1,300 feet) to the east of the Genteng reef system (which contains the islands of Genteng Besar and Genteng Kecil).	
Kelapa	5°39′13″S 106°34′22″E	Kelapa ("coconut") Island is the capital of the administrative village of Pulau Kelapa. The island contains a densely packed fishing village. It is the most populous island in the Kepulauan Seribu. The island is located to the west of Pulau Harapan (the capital of the Kelurahan of Pulau Harapan) and is connected by a 200-metre (660-foot) paved connection referred as the jembatan ("bridge"). It belongs to the same reef system as Pulau Harapan.	
Kelor Barat	5°33′29″S 106°31′31″E	Kelor Barat Island sits on the reef which makes up the islands of Yu Barat, Yu Timur, Kelor Timur, Satu, Jukung, Hantu Barat, and Hantu Timur.	
Kelor Timur	5°33′16″S 106°31′54″E	Kelor Timur Island sits on the reef which makes up the islands of Yu Barat, Yu Timur, Kelor Barat, Satu, Jukung, Hantu Barat, and Hantu Timur.	
Kuburan Cina	5°37′07″S 106°34′23″E	Kuburan Cina ("Chinese cemetery") Island is a small island with few trees. It is located southwest of Bira Besar Island.	
Lipan	5°31′18″S 106°31′31″E	Privately owned. The island belongs to the same reef system as the island of Sebaru Kecil, Bundar, and Kapas.	
Macan Besar/Matahari	5°36′19″S 106°32′38″E	Matahari Impian Indah has privately developed the island as a resort.	
Macan Kecil/Macan	5°35′56″S 106°32′50″E	Macan Kecil ("little tiger") Island was developed into Tiger Islands Village & Eco Resort in 2008, and is the region's first commercially operated eco resort. It features solar panels, rain water harvesting, driftwood furniture and construction, waste water gardens, an organic garden, and a coral planting conservation program. The island sits on the same reef as Putri Gundul Island.	
Melinjo/Malinjo	5°34′22″S 106°31′20″E	Privately owned.	
Melintang Besar	5°34′59″S 106°32′58″E	Privately owned.	
Melintang Kecil/Bintang	5°35′18″S 106°32′45″E	Melintang Kecil, also known as Bintang ("star") Island sits on the same reef as Melintang Besar Island. Buana Bintang Samudera has developed the island as a resort. The island contains some cottages.	
Pabelokan / Pembelokan	5°28′46″S 106°23′07″E	Pabelokan or Pembelokan ("curve") Island is named after its remote location, around 70 km (43 mi) from the North Jakarta shore, which forces visitors to take a series of hairpin turns to reach the island. The island is the westernmost island in Kepulauan Seribu. It is an 11 square-kilometer island with a shop, dorms, hotel, a water-treatment plant, an electric-power plant, and a jetty for large vessels. Since 1984 the oil firm YPF-Maxushas has used the island as a base.	
Panjang / Panjang Bawah	5°35′22″S 106°33′02″E	This island is located between Melintang Kecil and Putri Barat island. It is privately owned.	
Panjang Besar	5°38′41″S 106°33′38″E	Panjang Besar Island is the only island in Kepulauan Seribu that contains a landing strip.	
Panjang Kecil	5°38′33″S 106°33′14″E	Panjang Kecil Island is a small island to the north of Panjang Besar Island. The island contains a wooden pier.	
Putri Barat	5°35′39″S 106°33′32″E	Buana Bintang Samudera has developed the island as a resort. The resort contains an underwater glass tunnel to observe the marine life.	
Putri Gundul	5°35′56″S 106°33′05″E	Putri Gundul Island sits on the same reef as Macan Kecil Island. It is the larger of the two.	
Rakit Tiang	5°38′58″S 106°33′57″E	Rakit Tiang Island is located to the north of Kelapa Island. The island sits on its own reef and contains a fishing village.	
Satu, Saktu	5°33′20″S 106°32′41″E	Satu Island sits on the reef which makes up the islands of Yu Barat, Yu Timur, Kelor Barat, Kelor Timur, Jukung, Hantu Barat, and Hantu Timur. Satu Island is privately owned.	
Sebaru Kecil	5°30′44″S 106°32′07″E	Sebaru Kecil ("Small Sebaru") Island is the largest island in a reef system which also contains the island of Bundar, Kapas, and Lipan.	
Semut	5°40′10″S 106°33′36″E	Semut ("ant") island is the southernmost island in the administrative village of Pulau Kelapa. The island contains a wooden pier. Despite the name similarity with Semut Besar ("big ant") and Semut Kecil ("little ant") Island, Semut Island is located much south than the other islands.	
Semut Besar	5°34′20″S 106°33′26″E	Privately owned.	
Tongkeng	5°35′33″S 106°32′36″E	Privately owned.	
Yu Barat / Yu Besar / Iyu Besar	5°32′50″S 106°31′04″E	Yu Barat is the westernmost island of the reef which makes up the islands of Yu Timur, Kelor Barat, Kelor Timur, Satu, Jukung, Hantu Barat, and Hantu Timur.	
Yu Timur / Yu Kecil / Iyu Kecil	5°33′02″S 106°31′36″E	Yu Timur Island sits on the reef which makes up the islands of Yu Barat, Kelor Barat, Kelor Timur, Satu, Jukung, Hantu Barat, and Hantu Timur.	

==== Kelurahan Pulau Harapan ====
The Kelurahan (administrative village) of Pulau Harapan (postal code 14540) makes up the eastern part of the Kecamatan of Kepulauan Seribu Utara. Officially, the Kelurahan contains 30 islands.

Names in italics are not considered islands.

Island	Location	Remarks	Image
Belanda	5°36′23″S 106°36′19″E	Belanda ("Netherlands") Island, spelled Wollanda in colonial times, is covered with causarina trees.	
Bulat	5°37′48″S 106°34′26″E	Bulat ("spherical") This privately owned island sits is roughly round in contour and sits on its own reef.	
Buton	5°28′22″S 106°32′28″E	This small island is a marine reserve. It is located south of Penjaliran Barat Island and belongs to the same reef system.	
Bira Besar	5°36′43″S 106°34′35″E	Pulau Seribu Paradise has privately developed this island as a resort.	
Bira Kecil	5°37′09″S 106°35′03″E	Bira Kecil Island sits on its own reef.	
Dua Timur	5°25′12″S 106°29′31″E	This is one of the northernmost islands in Kepulauan Seribu.	
Gosong Laga Besar	5°32′20″S 106°34′44″E	Tiny isolated island.	
Gosong Laga Kecil	5°31′44″S 106°34′32″E	Tiny isolated island.	
Gosong Perak	5°34′38″S 106°34′08″E	A sandbar 400 m (1,300 ft) north of Perak Island. Not to be confused with Gosong Pulauperak, another sandbar 400 m (1,300 ft) southwest of Perak Island.	
Gosong Sepa Besar	5°34′01″S 106°35′30″E		
Gosong Sepa Kecil	5°34′30″S 106°35′07″E		
Harapan	5°39′11″S 106°34′41″E	The capital of the Kelurahan of Pulau Harapan. The island is located to the west of Pulau Kelapa, and connected to it by a 200-metre (660 ft) paved connection referred as the jembatan ("bridge"). The island belongs to the same reef system as Pulau Kelapa. Pulau Harapan is populated by people from Pulau Kelapa and Tangerang. The island was formerly known as Pulau Pelemparan ("throwing", "ejection") because it was the place where the Bugis and some other people were exiled. Later the island's name was changed to Harapan ("hope"), to symbolize a new era.	
Jagung	5°28′49″S 106°31′05″E	Jagung ("corn") Island is thickly wooded with high trees.	
Karang Sembage	5°33′52″S 106°34′14″E	A reef 500 metres (1,640 ft) northeast of Semut Kecil Island.	
Kayu Angin Utara / Bira	5°36′24″S 106°33′58″E	Kayu Angin Utara is a small island located 650 metres (2,133 ft) northwest of the larger Bira Besar Island. The island is privately owned.	
Opak Besar	5°40′17″S 106°34′56″E	Opak Besar Island is the southernmost island of the administrative village of Pulau Harapan. It is privately owned.	
Nyamplung	5°30′20″S 106°32′10″E	Nyamplung Island is located north of Sebaru Kecil Island.	
Pamegaran / Pamadaran	5°38′13″S 106°34′53″E	Pamegaran Island contains a jetty and is covered with low trees. It is privately owned.	
Penjaliran Barat / Pancalirang Kecil	5°28′08″S 106°32′59″E	A marine reserve. The island contains a protected mangrove forest area. The island is the largest island in a reef system which also contains the much smaller Buton Island.	
Penjaliran Timur / Pancalirang Besar	5°28′00″S 106°33′00″E	A marine reserve. The island is densely wooded with tall trees and contains a protected mangrove forest.	
Perak	5°34′59″S 106°34′07″E	Perak ("silver") Island is located north of Putri Timur Island. This 3.06 ha island contains a jetty and is allocated for recreation.	
Peteloran Barat	5°28′09″S 106°32′28″E	A marine reserve. The island contains protected mangrove forests.	
Peteloran Timur / Peteloran	5°27′28″S 106°33′39″E	A marine reserve.	
Putri Timur	5°35′34″S 106°34′00″E	Developed as a resort.	
Rengit/Ringit	5°29′53″S 106°34′25″E	The island is densely wooded with high trees.	
Sabira	5°12′04″S 106°27′36″E	Formerly known as Noord Wachter or "North Guard", this is the northernmost island of the Kepulauan Seribu. It is situated around 126 km (78 mi) from the coast of Jakarta. This 10-hectare (25-acre) island is surrounded by coral reefs. The island is covered in coconut and breadfruit trees. There is a 50-metre (160 ft) lighthouse in the island, built in 1869. On the door of the lighthouse, a plaque is placed with inscription: "Onder de regering van Z.M Willem III Koning der Nederlander enz. opgericht voor draailicht 1869" (Dutch "Under the reign of His Majesty King William III of Netherlands etc., rotating light erected 1869")	
Sebaru Besar	5°30′04″S 106°32′54″E	Sebaru Besar ("big Sebaru") Island is one of the largest island (37.7 ha) around its reef system and possibly belongs to the same reef as Sebaru Kecil Island, to the west of this island. The island is allocated for forestry.	
Semut Kecil	5°34′02″S 106°33′57″E	Privately owned.	
Sepak Barat / Sepa Besar	5°34′33″S 106°34′52″E	Sepa Permai has developed the island as a resort.	
Sepak Timur / Sepa Timur / Sepa Kecil	5°34′20″S 106°35′12″E		
Tondan Barat / Tondan Besar / Petondan Besar / Pelangi	5°35′10″S 106°35′26″E	Pulau Seribu Paradise has developed the island as a resort.	
Tondan Timur / Tondan Kecil / Petondan Kecil / Papatheo	5°34′46″S 106°35′41″E	The island is developed as a resort.	
